= List of Haitians =

Haiti

Flag

Coat of Arms

This is a list of notable Haitian people. It includes people who were born in Haiti or possess Haitian citizenship, who are notable in Haiti and abroad. Due to Haitian nationality laws, dual citizenship is now permitted by the Constitution of Haiti, therefore people of Haitian ancestry born outside of the country are not included in this list, unless they have renounced their foreign citizenship or have resided extensively in Haiti and made significant contributions to Haitian government or society. The list includes both native-born and naturalized Haitians, as well as permanent foreign residents who have been recognized internationally for artistic, cultural, economic, historical, criminal, or political reasons, among others. If not indicated here, their birth in Haiti and notability are mentioned in their main article. This list does not include fictional characters or Haitian associations and organizations.

== Academics ==
- Peggy Brunache – archaeologist and food historian
- Jean Lud Cadet – psychiatrist at the National Institute on Drug Abuse
- Suzanne Comhaire-Sylvain – first female Haitian anthropologist
- Leslie Desmangles – anthropologist, author, and U.S. college professor
- Anténor Firmin – anthropologist and politician
- Jean Price-Mars – anthropologist and writer
- Michel-Rolph Trouillot – anthropologist and academic

== Business ==
- Charles Henri Baker – industrialist and 2006 and 2010 presidential candidate
- Gilbert Bigio – billionaire and retired businessman. He is the wealthiest person in Haiti
- Reginald Boulos – entrepreneur
- Jean-Claude Brizard – former CEO of Chicago Public Schools
- Bernard Fils-Aimé – former CEO of Comcel Haiti
- Antoine Izméry – businessman
- Viter Juste – businessman, community leader and activist who coined the name "Little Haiti" for the neighborhood in Miami, Florida, in the United States
- Julio Larosiliere – businessman
- Elisabeth Delatour Préval – businesswoman, presidential economic advisor and economist. She was the first lady of Haiti when she married President René Préval
- Daniel Rouzier – tycoon; appointed as Honorary Consul to Jamaica in 2010
- Mona Scott – CEO of Monami Entertainment in the United States
- Dumarsais Simeus – business executive
- Jerry Tardieu – founder and CEO of Royal Oasis
- Fincy Pierre – founder Balistrad
- Phanord Cabé – entrepreneur
- Emmanuel Fritz Paret – entrepreneur

== Organized crime and piracy ==
- Henri Caesar – allegedly a 19th-century Haitian revolutionary and pirate nicknamed black Caesar
- Jimmy "Babekyou" Chérizier – gang leader and head of the Revolutionary Forces of the G9 Family and Allies
- Emmanuel Constant – founder of FRAPH, a Haitian death squad that terrorised supporters of exiled president Jean-Bertrand Aristide
- Jacquotte Delahaye – one of the few known female pirates (or buccaneers)
- Jean Lafitte – pirate (born in France or Saint-Domingue, the modern-day Haiti)
- Pierre Lafitte – pirate (born in France or Saint-Domingue, the modern-day Haiti)
- Amiot Métayer – organized crime leader, once worked for President Jean-Bertrand Aristide to put pressure on the opposing political parties
- Buteur Métayer – organized crime leader in Haïti during the 2004 Haïti rebellion

== Economists and finance ==
- Leslie Delatour – economist
- Etzer S. Emile – economist
- Fritz Jean – governor of the Banque de la République d'Haïti, 1998–2001
- Jacques Jiha – economist
- Ericq Pierre – economist
- Jocelerme Privert – President of the Senate Committee on Economy and Finance
- Louis Eugène Roy – banker

== Entertainment ==
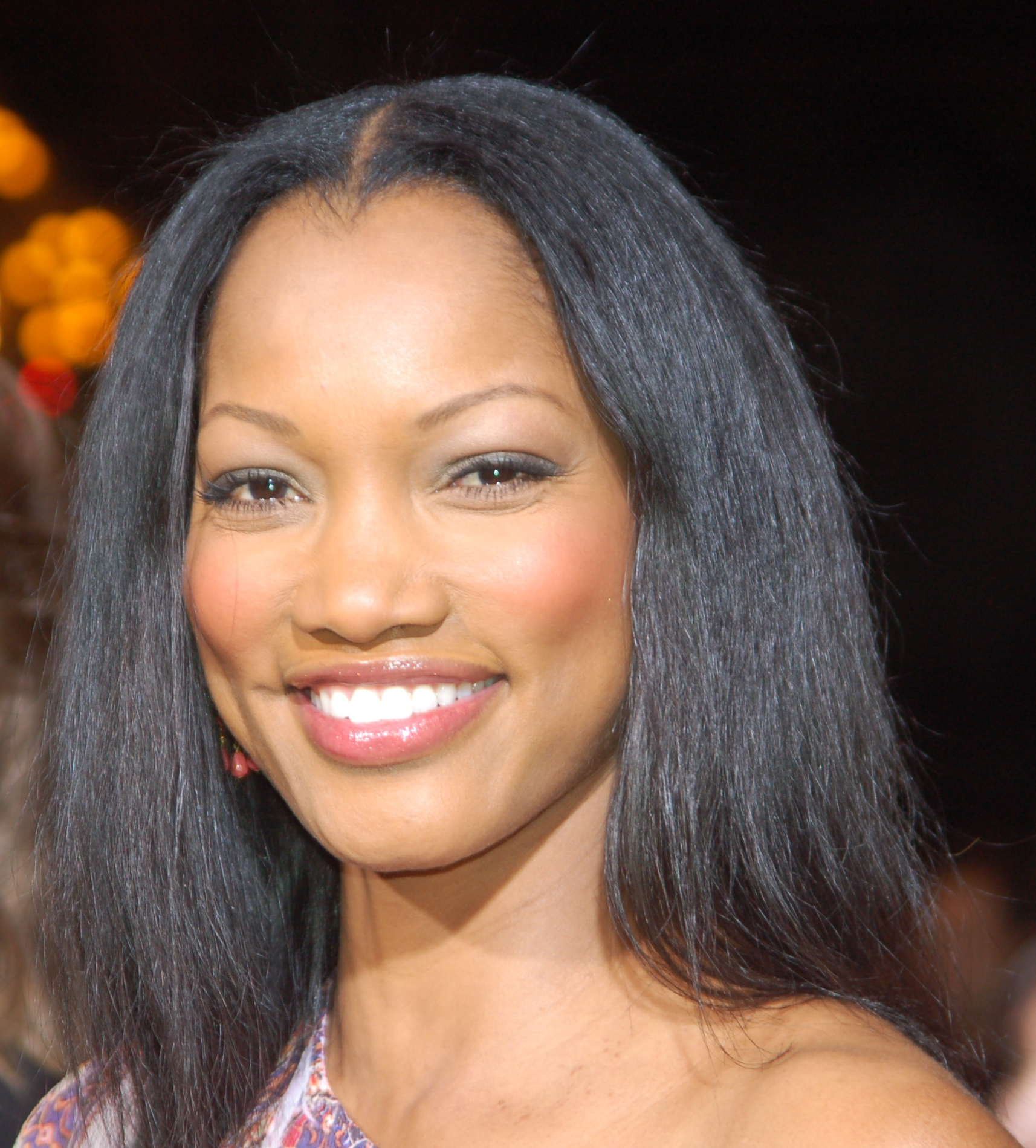
Actress Garcelle Beauvais

- Arnold Antonin – film director
- Annette Auguste – folk singer
- Stanley Barbot – Haitian-American radio personality
- Garcelle Beauvais – television actress (NYPD Blue, The Jamie Foxx Show)
- Patricia Benoit – director
- Raquel Pelissier – beauty queen and model
- Fabienne Colas – actress, director and producer and head of the Fabienne Colas Foundation
- Samuel Dameus – media personality and filmmaker
- Joasil Déméus Débrosse – radio journalist
- Jean-Léon Destiné – dancer and choreographer
- Pierre-Louis Dieufaite – actor
- Jeanne Duval – muse, actress and dancer
- Sony Esteus – radio journalist
- Gessica Généus - actress
- Jimmy Jean-Louis – model and actor (film Phat Girlz; television series Heroes)
- Val Jeanty – electronic music artist
- Johny Joseph – news anchor
- Jean-Claude La Marre – writer, director, and film and television actor
- Jeanne-Marie Marsan – French dramatic actress and an opera singer who moved to Saint-Domingue
- Luck Mervil – Canadian actor and singer-songwriter
- Minette et Lise – popular duet-actresses of Saint-Domingue
- Lenelle Moïse – actress, playwright and poet
- Panou – Canadian actor
- Hébert Peck – film producer
- Raoul Peck – film director
- Numa Perrier – actress
- Perri Pierre – award-winning filmmaker and actor
- Emmanuel Pierre-Antoine – professional ballroom dancer
- Richard Sénécal - filmmaker
- Michèle Stephenson – filmmaker
- TiCorn – folk singer

== Fashion designers ==
- Regine Chevallier – fashion designer, best known for her hats
- Fabrice Simon – artist and fashion designer, best known for his handmade beaded dresses

== Historical personalities ==
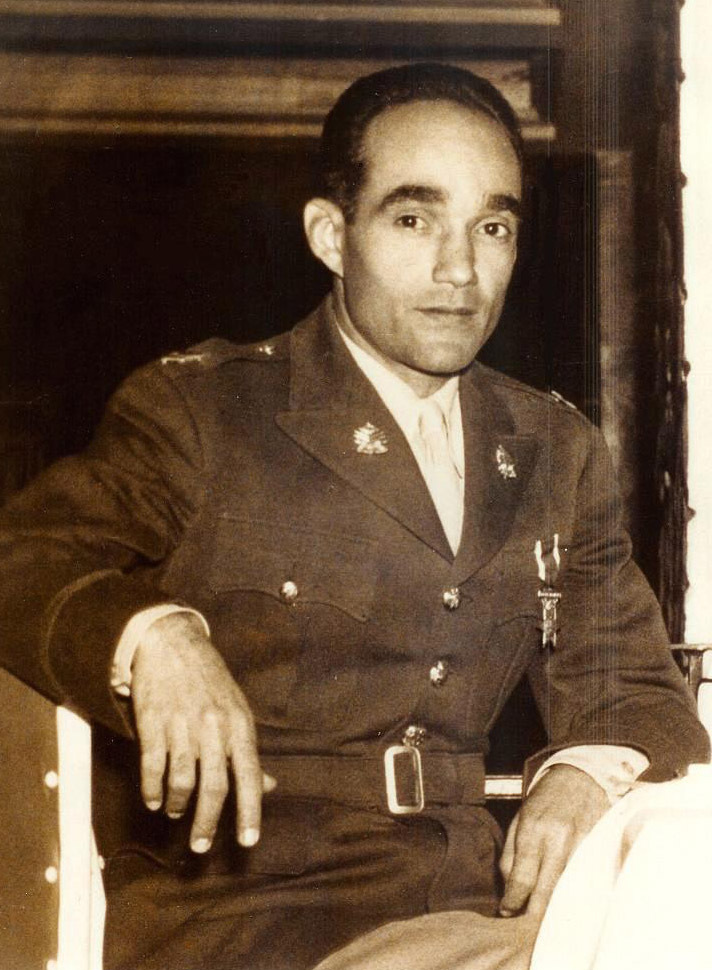
World War II fighter pilot and member of the Tuskegee Airmen, Alix Pasquet

- Madame Max Adolphe – right-hand woman of François Duvalier during his presidency in Haiti
- Magloire Ambroise – hero of the Haitian Independence
- Anacaona – Taíno cacica (chief) at the time of arrival of Christopher Columbus
- Sanité Bélair – freedom fighter and revolutionary; sergeant in the army of Toussaint Louverture
- Georges Biassou – rebel slave
- Tony Bloncourt – communist who joined the French Resistance against Nazi occupation in World War II
- Rosalvo Bobo – nationalist leader who opposed the U.S. Invasion
- Dutty Boukman – slave who was one of the most visible early leaders of the Haitian Revolution
- Pauline Brice-Thézan – liberal advocator
- Luckner Cambronne – head of the Tonton Macoutes; known as the "Vampire of the Caribbean" for his profiting from the sale of Haitian blood and cadavers to the West for medical uses
- Raymond Cassagnol (fr) – World War II fighter pilot, one of five Haitian members of the Tuskegee Airmen
- Jean-Baptiste Chavannes – Haitian soldier and abolitionist
- Cécile Fatiman – Vodou priestess and a figure of the Haitian Revolution
- Marie-Claire Heureuse Félicité – Empress of Haiti (1804–1806) as the spouse of Jean-Jacques Dessalines
- Catherine Flon – sewed the first Haitian flag
- Guy François – colonel of the armed forces of Haiti, accused of conspiring to overthrow the government in 1989 and 2001
- Jean François – rebel slave
- Michel François – Haitian army colonel who plotted a coup d'etat
- Alice Garoute – Haitian suffragist and women's rights advocate, a founder of Ligue Féminine d'Action Sociale (Feminine League for Social Action)
- Victoire Jean-Baptiste – Haitian politician de facto, mistress to President Florvil Hyppolite
- Jeannot – rebel slave
- Marie-Madeleine Lachenais – first First Lady of Haiti, married to Alexandre Pétion
- Joseph Philippe Lemercier Laroche – engineer and passenger on the ill-fated RMS Titanic
- Adélina Lévêque – Empress Consort of Haiti, 1849–1859, as wife of Faustin I
- Abner Louima – victim of assault and sexual abuse in 1997 by officers of the New York City Police Department
- Macaya – Kongolese-born Haitian revolutionary military leader
- François Mackandal – houngan (Vodou priest) and rebel slave leader
- Étienne Mentor – Martinique-born politician who represented Saint-Domingue in the Council of Five Hundred
- Clairvius Narcisse – man said to have been turned into a living zombie by a combination of drugs
- Alix Pasquet – World War II fighter pilot, one of five Haitian members of the Tuskegee Airmen
- Charlemagne Péralte – nationalist leader who opposed the U.S. Invasion
- Gérard Pierre-Charles – politician and former leader of the Unified Party of Haitian Communists
- Jean Baptiste Point du Sable – founder of Chicago, born in Saint-Domingue, the modern-day Haiti
- Marie St. Fleur – first Haitian-American state representative in Massachusetts
- Madeleine Sylvain-Bouchereau – sociologist and educator, a founder of the Ligue Féminine d'Action Sociale (Women's Social Action League)
- Modeste Testas – formerly enslaved Ethiopian women, whose life is marked with a statue in Bordeaux
- Charles Terres Weymann – racing pilot and businessman
- Dominique You – privateer, soldier, and politician

== Lawyers ==
- Sarodj Bertin
- Max Hudicourt
- Mario Joseph
- Jacques Nicolas Léger
- Justin Lhérisson
- Vanessa Dalzon
- Alix Mathon
- Alexandre Paul
- Georges Sylvain
- Léon Thébaud
- Yves Volel

== Literature ==
Nominee for the Nobel Prize in Literature, Frankétienne

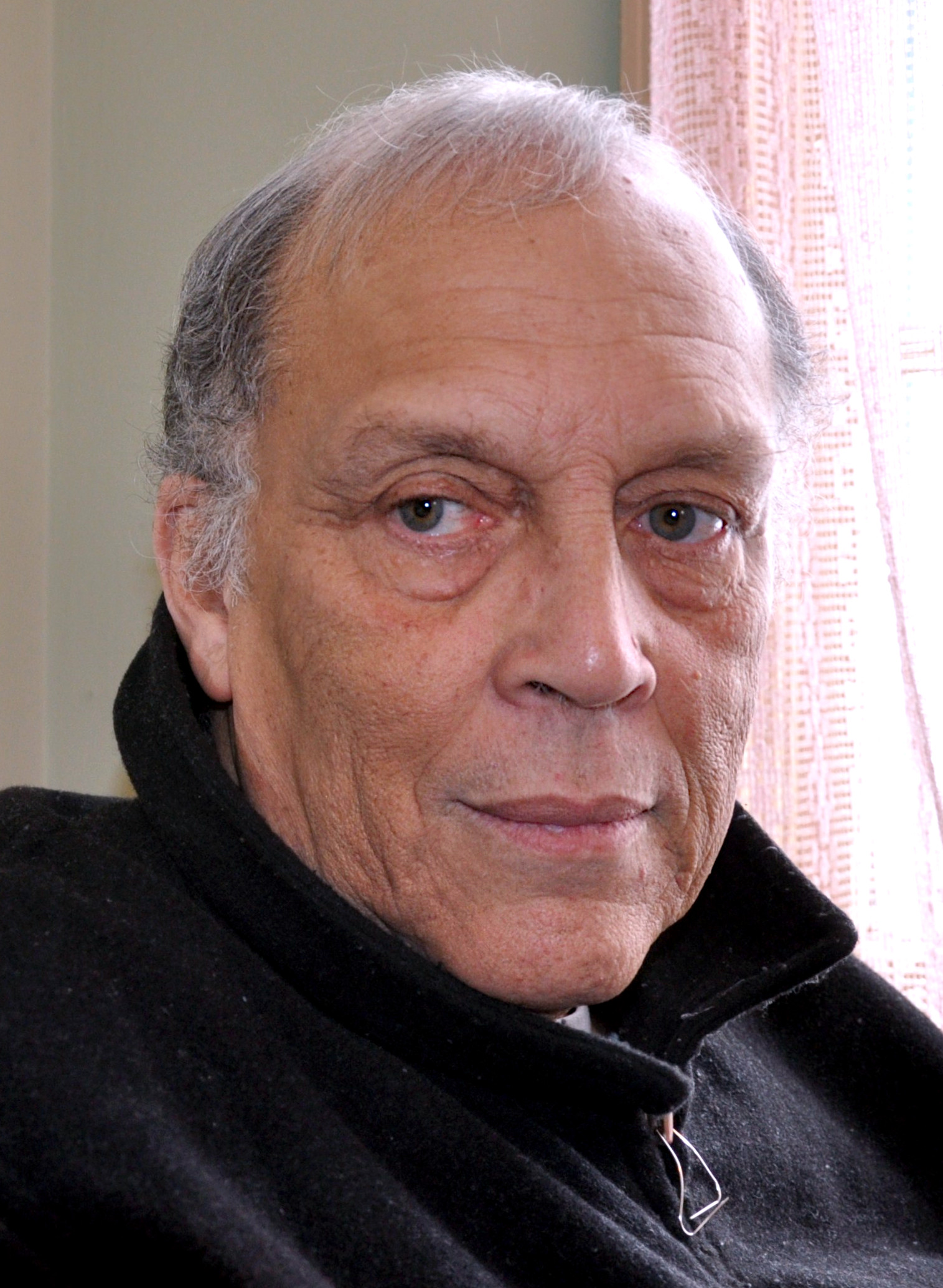
Josaphat-Robert Large, recipient of the Prix littéraire des Caraïbes

- Jacques Stephen Alexis – doctor, writer, and founder of the Haitian Communist Party and Parti D'entente Populaire
- Marlène Rigaud Apollon – poet, youth non-fiction writer
- Beaubrun Ardouin – historian and politician
- Céligny Ardouin – historian and politician
- Coriolan Ardouin – romantic poet
- Elsie Augustave – author
- Mimi Barthélémy – writer and storyteller
- Jacqueline Beaugé-Rosier – poet, novelist, educator
- Dantès Bellegarde – historian and diplomat
- Bayyinah Bello – historian
- Michèle Bennett – former first lady, wife of President for Life Jean-Claude Duvalier, later exiled with him
- Boisrond-Tonnerre – the author of the Independence Act of Haiti
- Emeric Bergeaud – novelist
- Guy Joseph Bonnet – historian, army general, signer of the Haitian Act of Independence
- Jean-Fernand Brierre – poet
- Carl Brouard – poet
- Edner Brutus – historian, diplomat and politician
- Timoléon C. Brutus – historian and politician
- Georges Castera – poet
- Suzy Castor – historian and social activist
- Christophe Charles – poet
- Raymond Chassagne – poet and essayist
- Jean-Baptiste Cinéas – novelist and Supreme Court judge
- Massillon Coicou – poet, novelist, playwright, and politician
- Louis-Philippe Dalembert – novelist, poet and essayist, winner of the Cuban Literary Prize Casa de las Américas
- Edwidge Danticat – American author
- Felix Darfour – journalist
- Maggy de Coster – journalist and poet.
- Michel DeGraff – Creolist who has served on the board of the Journal of Haitian Studies
- Demesvar Delorme – theoretician, writer, and politician
- Lilas Desquiron – novelist, ethnologist, cabinet minister
- Roger Dorsinville – poet, dramatist, historian, and diplomat
- Joel Dreyfuss – Haitian-American journalist, editor, and writer now based in Paris, France
- Oswald Durand – poet and politician, said to be "to Haiti what Shakespeare is to England and Dante to Italy."
- Antoine Dupré – poet and playwright
- Frantz Duval – editor-in-chief of Le Nouvelliste newspaper
- Alibée Féry – playwright, poet, and storyteller
- Jessica Fièvre – novelist, editor
- Jean-Claude Fignolé – author
- Anténor Firmin – anthropologist, journalist, and politician
- Odette Roy Fombrun – author, opened Haiti's first kindergarten
- Frankétienne (born Franck Étienne) – author, poet, playwright, musician and painter. Candidate for Nobel Prize for Literature in 2009
- Fred Edson Lafortune (fr) – poet, writer and editor
- Danielle Legros Georges – award-winning poet, writer, educator, and editor
- Mona Guérin – educator and writer
- Fabrice Guerrier – science fiction and fantasy writer
- Yvonne Hakim-Rimpel, journalist
- Nathalie Handal – award-winning poet, writer, and playwright
- Choiseul Henriquez – journalist
- Fernand Hibbert – novelist, one of the most-widely read Haitian authors
- Ady Jean-Gardy – journalist and activist; founder of the Haitian Press Federation
- Aubelin Jolicoeur – columnist
- Johny Joseph – journalist and academic
- Raymond Joseph – journalist, diplomat, political activist
- Laurore St. Juste – historian and author
- Dany Laferrière – Haitian-Canadian novelist and journalist, member of the Académie française
- Edmond Laforest – poet, novelist
- Juliette Bussière Laforest-Courtois – teacher and journalist
- Josaphat-Robert Large – poet, novelist and art critic; won the Prix littéraire des Caraïbes (Caribbean literary Prize) in 2003
- Dimitry Elias Léger – novelist
- François-Romain Lhérisson – poet and educator
- Thomas Madiou – his work Histoire d'Haïti (English: History of Haiti) is considered one of the most valuable documents of Haitian literature
- Marie-Sœurette Mathieu – sociologist, teacher and writer now residing in Quebec.
- Jean-Euphèle Milcé - novelist and librarian
- Jules Solime Milscent – fabulist, poet, and politician
- Michèle Montas – journalist
- Charles Moravia – poet, dramatist, teacher, and diplomat
- Félix Morisseau-Leroy – author, writer, educator, activist, poet, and playwright
- Émile Nau – historian and politician
- Marilene Phipps – Haitian-American poet, painter, and short-story writer
- Pradel Pompilus – writer and scholar, best known for his three-volume study of Haitian literature.
- Paulette Poujol-Oriol – educator, writer and feminist
- Emmelie Prophète – writer and diplomat
- Jacques Roumain – poet, novelist, editor
- Émile Roumer – poet
- Edris Saint-Amand – novelist
- Rodney Saint-Éloi – poet
- Prince Saunders – author; emigrated to Haiti from the United States
- Elsie Suréna – poet, photographer
- Marie-Alice Théard – writer
- Évelyne Trouillot – author
- Jocelyne Trouillot – writer
- Alain Turnier – historian
- Gary Victor – writer and playwright
- Etzer Vilaire – poet
- René Depestre – author, writer, activist, poet

== Medicine ==
- Yvette Bonny (born 1938) – Haitian Canadian pediatrician
- Henri Ford – Haitian-American pediatric surgeon
- François Fournier de Pescay – first person of color to have practiced medicine and surgery in Europe
- Alonzo P. B. Holly – American-Haitian doctor, diplomat, writer
- Rulx Léon – physician, historian, and journalist
- Régine Laurent – Haitian-born Canadian nurse and trade unionist
- Bendson Louima – physician and founder of Médecins Sans Frontières Suisse Cap-Haitïen, an entity for the treatment of cholera in Haiti
- Yvonne Sylvain – first female doctor in Haiti
- Loune Viaud – health care worker, won the 2002 Robert F. Kennedy Human Rights Award for her work within Zanmi Lasante, providing health care in Haiti

== Monarchs ==
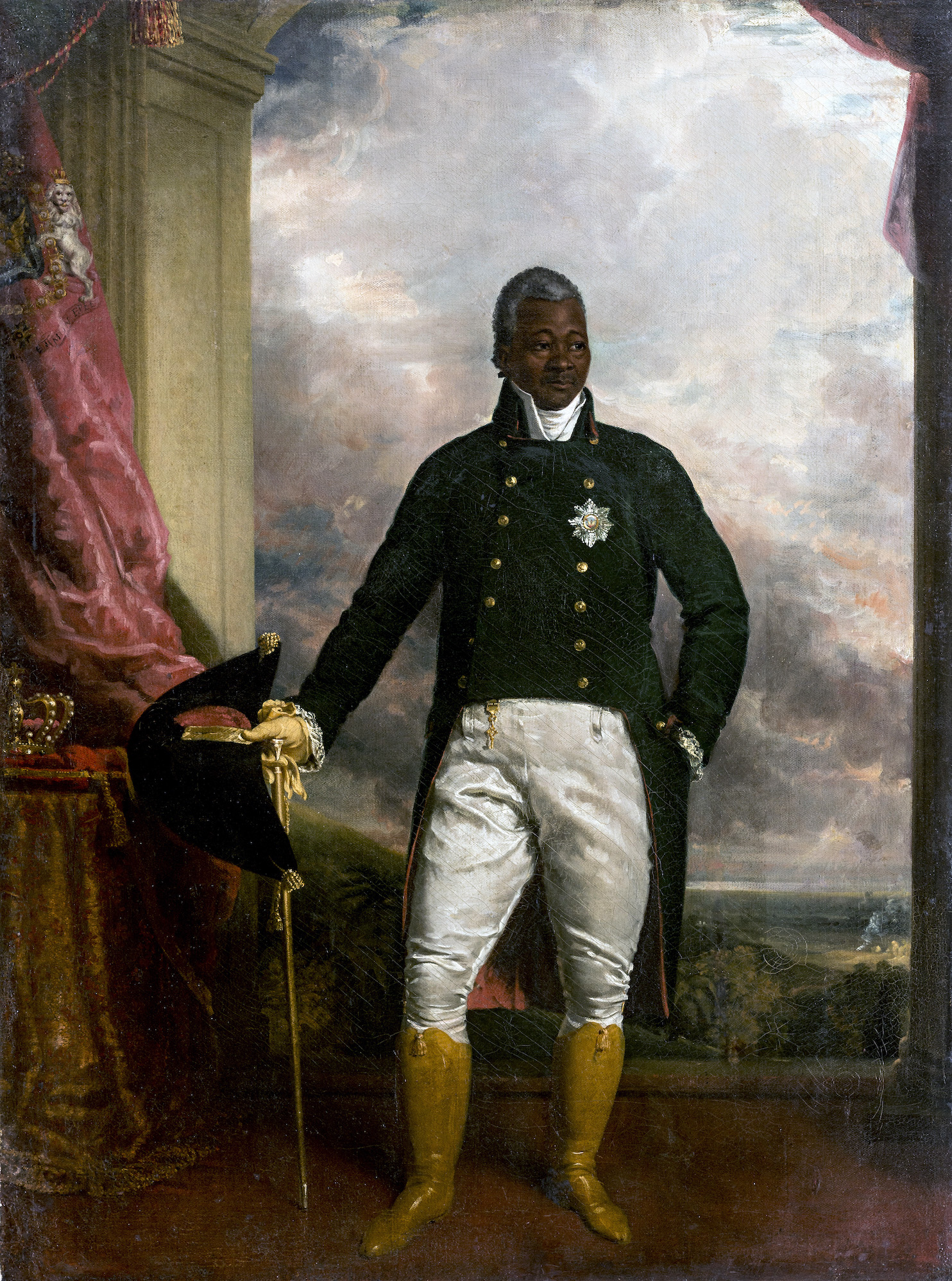
King Henri I

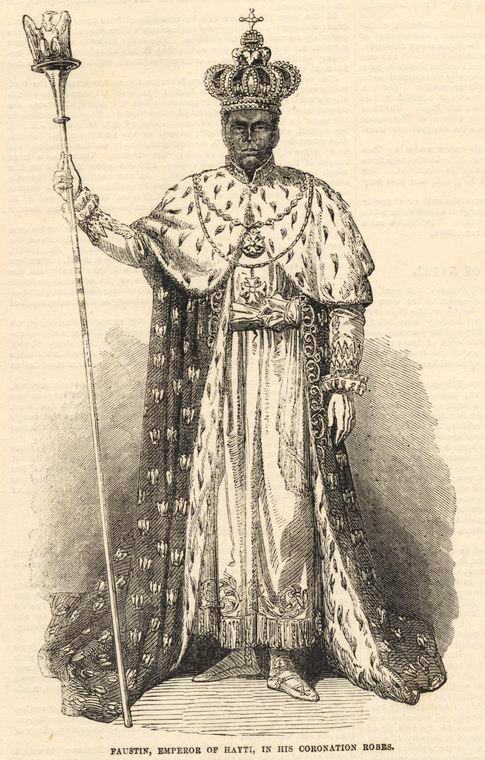
Emperor Faustin I

- Emperor Jacques I
- King Henri I
- Emperor Faustin I

== Music ==
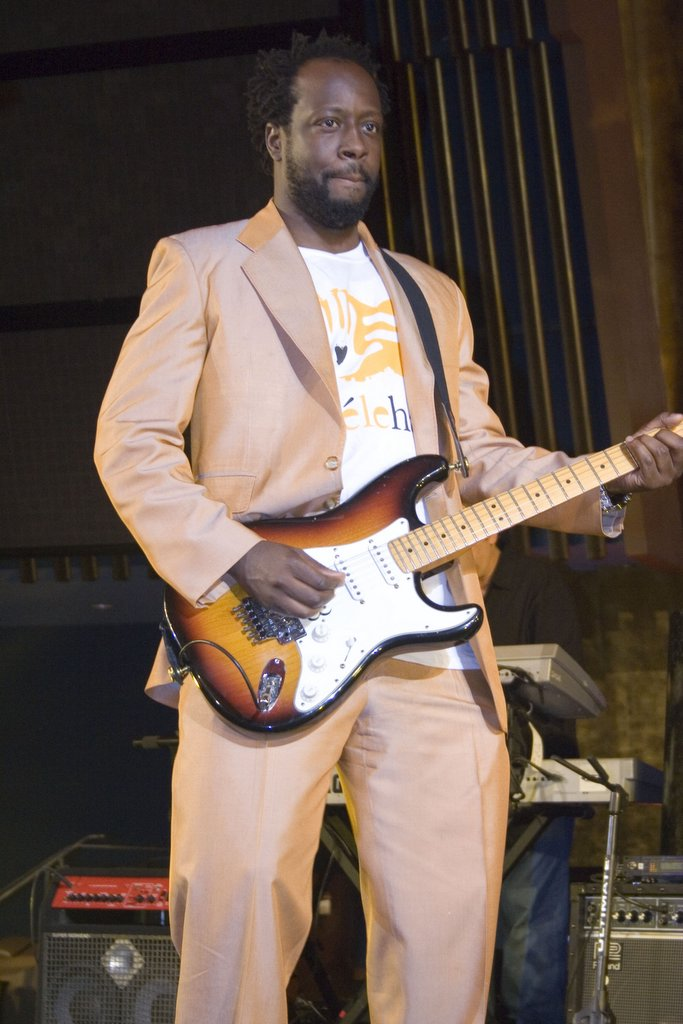
Musician and former singer of The Fugees, Wyclef Jean

- Frisner Augustin – major performer and composer of Haitian Vodou drumming
- Othello Bayard – musician, violinist, poet, and composer; wrote the music for the patriotic song "Haïti Chérie"
- Barikad Crew – hip hop group
- BélO – interpreter, composer and guitarist
- Bigga Haitian – first Haitian singer to break into the Jamaican reggae scene
- Toto Bissainthe – folk music artist
- Carmen Brouard – composer and pianist
- Alexandrine-Caroline Branchu – French opera soprano and mistress of Napoleon Bonaparte (born in Cap-Français, Saint-Domingue; the modern-day Cap-Haïtien, Haiti)
- Michael Brun – DJ, record producer
- John Steve Brunache – musician
- Frantz Casseus – guitarist and composer
- Manno Charlemagne – political folk singer-songwriter and acoustic guitarist, lifelong political activist and former politician
- Coupé Cloué – soccer player, singer and bandleader
- Félix Cumbé – Haitian-Dominican singer-songwriter of merengue and bachata music
- Euphémie Daguilh – composer and choreographer, royal mistress of emperor Jean-Jacques Dessalines
- Jerry Duplessis – Grammy Award-winning musical composer and record producer
- Justin Elie – composer and pianist, one of the best-known composers outside of Haiti
- Yanick Etienne – singer
- Eddy François (singer) – founding member of Boukman Eksperyans and Boukan Ginen
- Gardy Girault – electronic musician, DJ, record producer
- Nicolas Geffrard – musician; composed Haitian national anthem
- Lee Holdridge – multi-award-winning Haitian-born composer
- Fred Hype – beatmaker and producer
- Imposs – Haitian-Canadian rapper
- Werner Jaegerhuber – known for composing "Messe sur les Airs Vodouesques".
- Misty Jean – singer
- Wyclef Jean – Grammy Award-winning singer and former member of The Fugees, hip hop recording artist, musician, actor, and politician
- Nemours Jean-Baptiste – composer and band leader; credited with being the inventor of compas direct
- Val Jeanty – vodou electronica turntablist, percussionist and artist
- Jimmy O – rapper
- Romel Joseph – violinist and music educator.
- Kaytranada – DJ, record producer
- Ludovic Lamothe – composer and virtuoso pianist
- Andrée Lescot – folk singer; daughter of former president Élie Lescot.
- Ti Manno – singer, guitar player, keyboard player, and percussionist
- Master Dji – rapper
- MC Tee – rapper
- Luck Mervil – singer-songwriter
- Emeline Michel – singer
- Mikaben – singer-songwriter, composer and producer
- Michel Mauléart Monton – composer; notable for composing the classic song choucoune (known as yellow bird in the English version)
- Emerante Morse – singer
- Richard Auguste Morse – founder of a mizik rasin band, RAM, named after his initials, and famous in Haiti for their political songs
- Beethova Obas – guitarist
- Carlos Alfredo Peyrellade (1840–1908) – Haitian classical pianist and music educator
- J. Perry – singer-songwriter; song Dekole inspired the theme of the 2012 Carnival and was awarded a Gold Disk Plaque
- Qwote – singer
- Fabrice Rouzier – pianist, producer, and entrepreneur
- Sha Money XL – rapper
- Michel Martelly, also known as Sweet Micky – former president of Haiti and singer
- Webert Sicot – saxophone player, composer and band leader, and one of the creators of compas direct. He renamed the music cadence rampa after he left Nemours' band in 1962.
- Ti Roro – drummer; known as 'King of the drum' in Haiti
- André Toussaint – singer and guitarist
- Won-G Bruny – rapper and entrepreneur
- Édouard Woolley – tenor, actor, composer, and music educator
- Arly Lariviere – Haitian musician, composer and keyboardist
- Toby Anbakè – Haitian rapper and singer
- Oswald – Haitian singer

== Naturalists and agronomists ==
- John James Audubon – French-American ornithologist, naturalist, and painter (born in Saint-Domingue, the modern-day Haiti)
- Jean-Baptiste Chavannes – agronomist, awarded the Goldman Environmental Prize in 2005
- Marilise Neptune Rouzier – biologist and ethnobotanist
- Jean Wiener – marine biologist, awarded the Goldman Environmental Prize in 2015

== Political figures ==
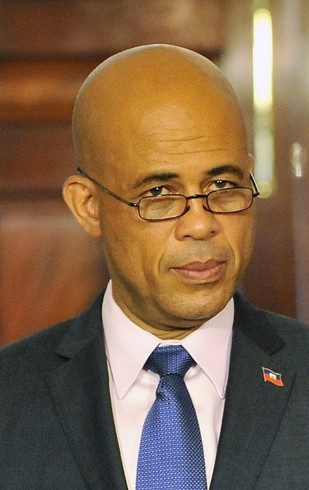
Former President of Haiti, Michel Martelly

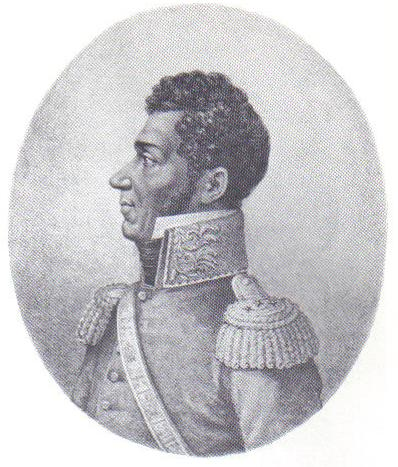
President Jean-Pierre Boyer (1818–1843)

- André Apaid – politician and activist leader of Group 184, which helped oust President Jean-Bertrand Aristide
- Jean-Bertrand Aristide – Former Salesian priest and President of Haiti (February 1991 - September 1991, October 1994 - February 1995, February 2000 - February 2004)
- Prosper Avril – President of Haiti (1988–1990)
- Jean-Claude Bajeux – political activist and professor of Caribbean literature
- Marc Bazin – United Nations diplomat and World Bank official
- Jean-Pierre Boyer – soldier and President of Haiti
- François Capois – hero of the war of independence
- Max Chancy – activist
- Ulrick Chérubin – Canadian politician
- Bonivert Claude – former governor of the Banque de la République d'Haïti
- Jean Rénald Clérismé – politician, diplomat, and ambassador
- Marie-Louise Coidavid – Queen of Haiti (1811–1820) as the spouse of Henri I
- Philippe Derose – first Haitian elected to public office in the U.S.
- Emmanuel Dubourg – Canadian politician
- Dominique Dupuy - minister of foreign affairs
- Thomas-Alexandre Dumas – general in Revolutionary France, the highest-ranking person of color in a continental European army
- François Duvalier – former President for Life
- Jean-Claude Duvalier – President of Haiti
- Simone Duvalier – First Lady of the 'Baby Doc' regime
- Mathieu Eugene – U.S. New York City councilman
- Raina Forbin – Minister of Foreign Affairs
- Jonathas Granville – soldier, diplomat, civil servant, musician and poet. He promoted the emigration of free Blacks from the U.S. to Haiti.
- Joseph Balthazar Inginac – General of the Pétion-Boyer administration.
- Michaëlle Jean – former Governor General of Canada
- Raymond Joseph – diplomat, political activist, journalist, Haitian ambassador to the United States (2005–2010)
- Gérard Latortue – Prime Minister and official in the United Nations
- Jacques Nicolas Léger – politician, diplomat
- Toussaint Louverture – father of Haiti, leader of Haitian slave rebellion, military general in the Haitian Revolution
- Léonie Coicou Madiou (1891–1974), political activist
- Michel Martelly – musician (a.k.a. Sweet Micky) and President of Haiti
- Alice Téligny Mathon – feminine activist
- Jovenel Moïse – President (2017–2021)
- Vincent Ogé – revolutionary
- Gerald Oriol Jr. – Secretary of State for the Integration of Persons with Disabilities
- Ertha Pascal-Trouillot – provisional President of Haiti 1990–1991, the first woman to hold that office
- Jean Jacques Dessalines – First Haitian Emperor, leader of the Haitian Revolution and first ruler of an independent Haiti under the 1805 constitution.
- Charlemagne Péralte – nationalist leader and revolutionary
- Alexandre Pétion – nationalist, revolutionary and first president of Haiti
- Solange Pierre – human rights advocate in the Dominican Republic who worked to end antihaitianismo
- Michèle Pierre-Louis – second female prime minister of Haiti (2008–2009)
- René Préval – President (2006–2011)
- Julien Raimond – agriculturalist and revolutionary
- André Rigaud – military leader during the Haitian Revolution
- Marie Michele Rey – minister of finance and foreign affairs
- François C. Antoine Simon – President (1908–1911)
- Sténio Vincent – President of Haiti (1930–1941)
- Claudette Werleigh – first Haitian woman to become Prime Minister

== Religion ==
- Antoine Adrien – Roman Catholic priest and liberation theology advocate
- Eliezer Cadet – Vodou priest involved in the UNIA in the United States
- Emmanuel Constant – Roman Catholic bishop
- François Gayot – Roman Catholic archbishop
- James Theodore Holly – American emigré to Haiti, first Black Episcopalian bishop, founded church in Haiti
- Gérard Jean-Juste – Roman Catholic priest and rector of Saint Claire's church for the poor in Port-au-Prince
- Mary Elizabeth Lange – founder of a Roman Catholic religious community for women
- Chibly Langlois – Haiti's first Roman Catholic cardinal
- Mama Lola – Vodou priestess
- Olin Pierre Louis – Roman Catholic priest in San Juan, Puerto Rico
- Joseph Serge Miot – Roman Catholic archbishop
- Pierre-Antoine Paulo – Roman Catholic bishop
- Guy Sansaricq – first Haitian-born Roman Catholic bishop in the United States
- Pierre Toussaint – philanthropist and candidate for sainthood in the Roman Catholic Church
- Juliette Toussaint – wife of Pierre Toussaint; philanthropist

== Science ==
- Max Beauvoir – chemist
- Hermanie Pierre – Haitian-American civil engineer and Miss Haiti International winner

== Sports ==
=== American football players ===
- Jocelyn Borgella – former defensive back
- Gosder Cherilus – offensive tackle
- Gilles Colon – wide receiver
- Pierre Desir – cornerback
- Vladimir Ducasse – offensive lineman
- Farell Duclair – fullback in the Canadian Football League
- Elvis Dumervil – defensive end and linebacker
- Jean Fanor – safety
- Junior Galette – linebacker
- Max Jean-Gilles – guard
- Kerby Joseph, safety
- Ricot Joseph – safety
- Nico Marley – linebacker
- Dadi Nicolas – outside linebacker
- Kevin Pamphile – left tackle
- Paul Raymond – wide receiver
- Jonal Saint-Dic – defensive end

=== Basketball ===
- Djery Baptiste – college basketball player
- Kervin Bristol – professional basketball player currently playing for the KK Włocławek of the Polish Basketball League.
- Samuel Dalembert – former professional basketball player in the National Basketball Association
- Schnider Hérard – college basketball player
- Osvaldo Jeanty – professional basketball player
- Rudolphe Joly – professional basketball player
- Antoine Joseph – professional basketball player in the American Basketball League
- Robert Joseph – former professional basketball player who played in the Liga ACB in Spain for twelve seasons.
- Yvon Joseph – professional basketball player, the first Haitian to play NCAA college basketball in the United States
- Skal Labissière – professional basketball player for the Sacramento Kings in the National Basketball Association
- Cady Lalanne – professional basketball player
- Gino Lanisse – Haitian-Swiss professional basketball player, who played in the Swiss pro league
- Marc-Eddy Norelia – college basketball player
- Olden Polynice – professional basketball player
- Pierre Valmera – retired professional basketball player, who played in the Swiss pro league

=== Boxing ===
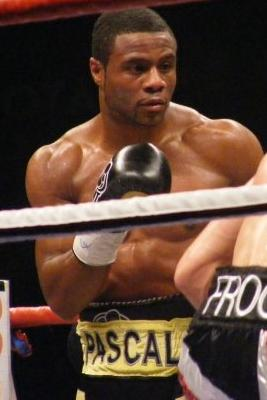
Boxing current lightweight champion, Jean Pascal

- Joachim Alcine – professional boxer
- Azea Augustama – professional boxer; who qualified for the 2008 Olympic Games at light-heavy through a bronze medal finish at the second Americas qualifier; he also won the Golden Gloves in 2008
- Jean-Pierre Augustin - professional boxer
- Andre Berto – professional boxer
- Edner Cherry – Haitian-Bahamian professional boxer
- Richardson Hitchins – Olympic boxer
- Schiller Hyppolite – professional boxer
- Dierry Jean – professional boxer
- Jean Pascal – professional boxer
- Melissa St. Vil – women's lightweight American boxer
- Adonis Stevenson – professional boxer, current WBC light heavyweight champion
- Bermane Stiverne – professional boxer, current WBC heavyweight champion, also the first boxer of Haitian descent to win a heavyweight title
- Darrelle Valsaint - professional boxer

=== Football ===
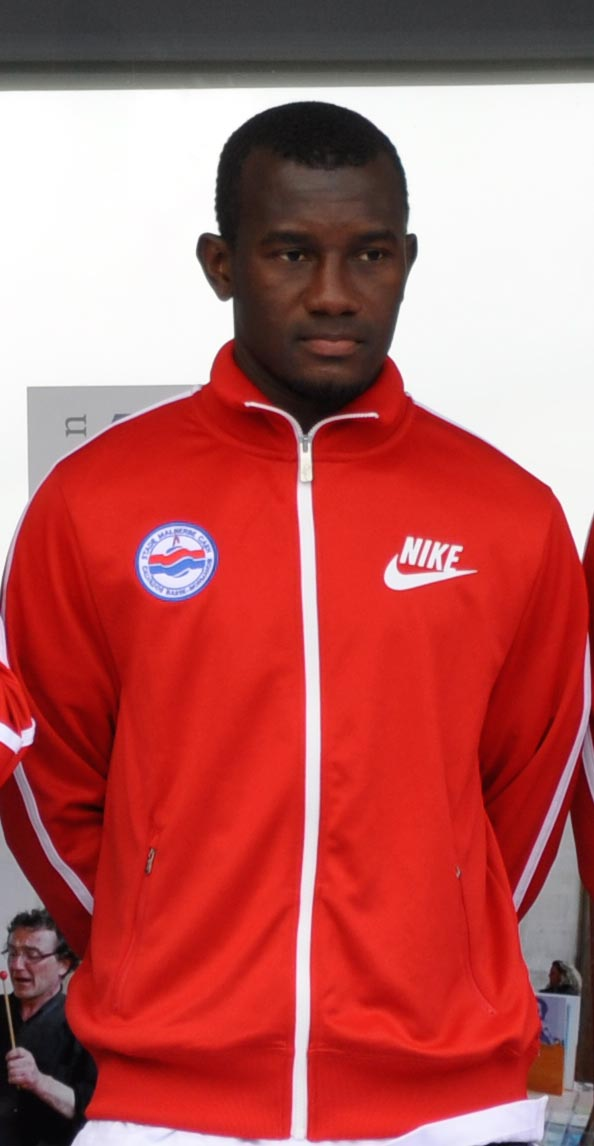
Football player, Jean-Jacques Pierre

- Ricardo Adé – professional football player
- Jean Sony Alcénat – professional football player
- Jean Alexandre – professional football player
- Djimy Alexis – professional football player
- Fritz André – professional football player
- Wedson Anselme – professional football player
- Eddy Antoine – professional football player who participated for Haiti at the 1974 FIFA World Cup
- Carlens Arcus – professional football player
- Ernst Atis-Clotaire – former professional football player; spent most of his career for AS Monaco FC
- Arsène Auguste – former professional football player
- Walson Augustin – professional football player
- Jean-Herbert Austin – professional football player
- Judelin Aveska – professional football player
- Bidrece Azor – professional football player
- Claude Barthélemy – professional football player
- Pierre Bayonne – professional football player
- Kervens Belfort – professional football player
- Bicou Bissainthe – professional football player
- Alexandre Boucicaut – professional football player
- John Boulos – professional football player
- Kimberly Boulos – professional women's football player
- Samantha Brand – professional women's football player
- Pierre Richard Bruny – professional football player
- Éliphène Cadet – professional football player
- Davidson Charles – professional football player
- Phenol Charles – professional football player
- Ricardo Charles – professional football player
- Monès Chéry – professional football player
- Alex Junior Christian – professional football player
- Coupé Cloué – professional football player
- Monuma Constant Jr. – professional football player
- Ronaldo Damus – professional football player
- Johnny Descolines – professional football player
- Jean-Claude Désir – professional football player
- Jonel Désiré – professional football player
- Wisline Dolce – professional women's football player
- Rudy Doliscat – Canadian professional football player
- Serge Ducosté – professional football player
- Ronil Dufrene – American professional football player
- Wagneau Eloi – professional football player
- Ronald Elusma – professional football player
- Lesly Fellinga – professional football player
- Gabard Fénélon – professional football player
- Pat Fidelia – professional football player
- Herby Fortunat – professional football player
- Henri Françillon – professional football player
- Christiano François – professional football player
- Guy François – professional football player
- Jacques Francois – professional football player
- Jean-Baptiste Fritzson – professional football player
- Brunel Fucien – professional football player
- Joe Gaetjens – professional football player who scored the only goal in the United States's upset of England at the 1950 FIFA World Cup
- Romain Genevois – professional football player
- Peter Germain – professional football player
- Frantz Gilles – professional football player
- Réginal Goreux – Belgian professional football player
- Marc Hérold Gracien – professional football player
- Wilde-Donald Guerrier – professional football player
- Stéphane Guillaume – professional football player
- Herve Guilliod – professional football player
- Charles Hérold Jr. – professional football player
- Jean-François James – professional football player
- Patrick Janvier – professional football player
- Bitielo Jean Jacques – professional football player
- Jamil Jean-Jacques – professional football player
- Ernst Jean-Joseph – professional football player
- Jean-Dimmy Jéoboam – professional football player
- Jean-Robens Jerome – professional football player
- Mechack Jérôme – professional football player
- Gérard Joseph – professional football player
- Peterson Joseph – professional football player
- Jacques LaDouceur – professional football player
- Fritz Leandré – professional football player
- Roody Lormera – professional football player
- Jeff Louis – professional football player
- Manoucheka Pierre Louis – professional women's football player
- Wilfried Louis – professional football player
- James Marcelin – professional football player
- Kencia Marseille – professional women's football player
- Frantz Mathieu – professional football player
- Jean-Robert Menelas – professional football player
- Pierre Mercier – professional football player
- Rénald Metelus – professional football player
- Pascal Millien – professional football player, currently playing for Sheikh Russel KC in the Bangladesh Premier League
- Frandy Montrévil – professional football player
- Wilner Nazaire – professional football player who participated for Haiti at the 1974 FIFA World Cup
- Duckens Nazon – professional football player
- Fabrice Noël – professional football player
- Windsor Noncent – professional football player
- Regillio Nooitmeer – Dutch professional football player
- Sony Norde – professional football player
- Vladimir Pascal – professional football player
- Peguero Jean Philippe – professional football player
- Bony Pierre – professional football player
- Golman Pierre – former professional football player
- Jean-Jacques Pierre – professional football player who currently plays for the French club SM Caen
- Marie Yves Dina Jean Pierre – professional women's football player
- Ricardo Pierre-Louis – professional football player
- Frantzdy Pierrot – professional football player
- Wilner Piquant – professional football player
- Serge Racine – professional football player
- Darline Radamaker – professional women's football player
- Guerry Romondt – professional football player
- Steeven Saba – professional women's football player
- Steeve Saint-Duc – professional football player
- Leonel Saint-Preux – professional football player
- Guy Saint-Vil – professional football player
- Roger Saint-Vil – professional football player
- Emmanuel Sanon – professional football player
- Emmanuel Sarki – professional football player
- Vaniel Sirin – professional football player
- Richelor Sprangers – professional football player
- Frantz St. Lot – professional football player
- Antoine Tassy – former professional football player and manager of the Haitian national football team in the 1974 FIFA World Cup
- Abel Thermeus – professional football player
- Denso Ulysse – professional football player
- Kénold Versailles – professional football player
- Fabien Vorbe – professional football player
- Philippe Vorbe – professional football player
- Sébastien Vorbe – professional football player
- Lindsay Zullo – professional women's football player

=== Other sports ===
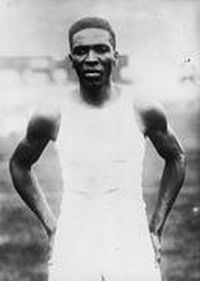
Long jump world-record holder and Haiti's highest-ranked Olympian, Silvio Cator

- Ronald Agénor – professional tennis player
- Ludovic Augustin – Olympic sport shooter, part of the team that won Haiti's first Olympic medal, at the 1924 Summer Olympics
- Ange Jean Baptiste – judoka who has participated internationally. She won a silver medal at the 2006 Central American and Caribbean Games.
- Claude-Alix Bertrand - professional polo player, founder of Haiti Polo Team
- Maxime Boisclair – professional Canadian hockey player
- Joel Brutus – judoka, won a silver medal at the 2003 Pan American Games
- Dayana Cadeau – Haitian-born Canadian-American professional bodybuilder
- Josué Cajuste – Paralympic athlete
- Asnage Castelly – Olympic wrestler; founder of the Haitian Wrestling Federation
- Silvio Cator – former world record holder in long jump and Olympic silver medal winner at 1928 Summer Olympics
- L. H. Clermont – Olympic sport shooter who was part of the team that won Haiti's first ever Olympic medal, a bronze in team free rifle at the 1924 Summer Olympics
- Gerald Clervil – Olympic track and field athlete
- André Corvington – Olympic fencer; competed in the individual foil event at the 1900 Summer Olympics
- Dadi Denis – Olympic sprinter
- Linouse Desravine – judoka
- Destin Destine – Olympic sport shooter; part of the team that won the first Olympic medal for Haiti
- C. Dupre – Olympic sport shooter
- Victoria Duval – professional tennis player
- Ginou Etienne – Olympic track and field athlete
- Neyssa Etienne – professional tennis player
- Gina Faustin – Olympic fencer; competed in the individual foil event at the 1984 Summer Olympics
- Nadine Faustin-Parker – Olympic hurdler and medal winner at the 2002 Central American and Caribbean Games
- Edrick Floréal – Olympic long and triple jumper who competed for Canada
- Naomy Grand'Pierre – Olympic swimmer
- Constantin Henriquez – Olympic Rugby player and footballer; co-founder of Haitian football
- Yves Jabouin – mixed martial arts fighter
- Nephtalie Jean-Louis – Paralympic athlete
- Jeffrey Julmis – Olympic sprinter
- Dieudonné LaMothe – long-distance runner, the first sportsperson from Haiti to take part in four Olympic Games
- Ernst Laraque – judoka from Haiti, won a bronze medal at the 2003 Pan American Games
- Parnel Legros – former Olympic judoka
- Aniya Louissaint – Olympic Taekwondo athlete
- Bertrand Madsen – former professional tennis player
- Eloi Metullus – Olympic sport shooter; part of the team that won the first Olympic medal for Haiti
- Jean-Louis Michel – fencing master (born in Saint-Domingue)
- Charles Olemus – Olympic track and field athlete
- Barbara Pierre – track and field sprint athlete in the Pan American Games
- Astrel Rolland – Olympic sport shooter
- Claude Roumain – Olympic sprinter
- Deborah Saint-Phard – Olympic shot putter at the 1988 Summer Olympics
- Tudor Sanon – taekwondo athlete
- Alain Sergile – swimmer who competed at the 1996 Summer Olympics
- Bruny Surin – 1996 Canadian Olympian, gold-medal-winning sprinter
- André Théard – Olympic sprinter; competed for Haiti at the 1924, 1928 and 1932 Summer Olympics
- Léon Thiércelin – Olympic fencer; competed in the individual foil event at the 1900 Summer Olympics
- Ludovic Valborge – Olympic sport shooter, part of the team that won Haiti's first Olympic medal, at the 1924 Summer Olympics
- Sheila Viard – Olympic fencer; competed in the individual foil event at the 1984 Summer Olympics
- Claude Vilgrain – Canadian professional hockey player

== See also ==
- People of Haitian descent
- Haitian Canadians
- Haitian diaspora
- Haitians in France
- List of Haitian Americans
