= Brunache =

Brunache is a surname. Notable people with the surname include:

- John Steve Brunache, Haitian musician
- Peggy Brunache, Haitian American food historian and archaeologist
