= Petit Séminaire Collège Saint-Martial =

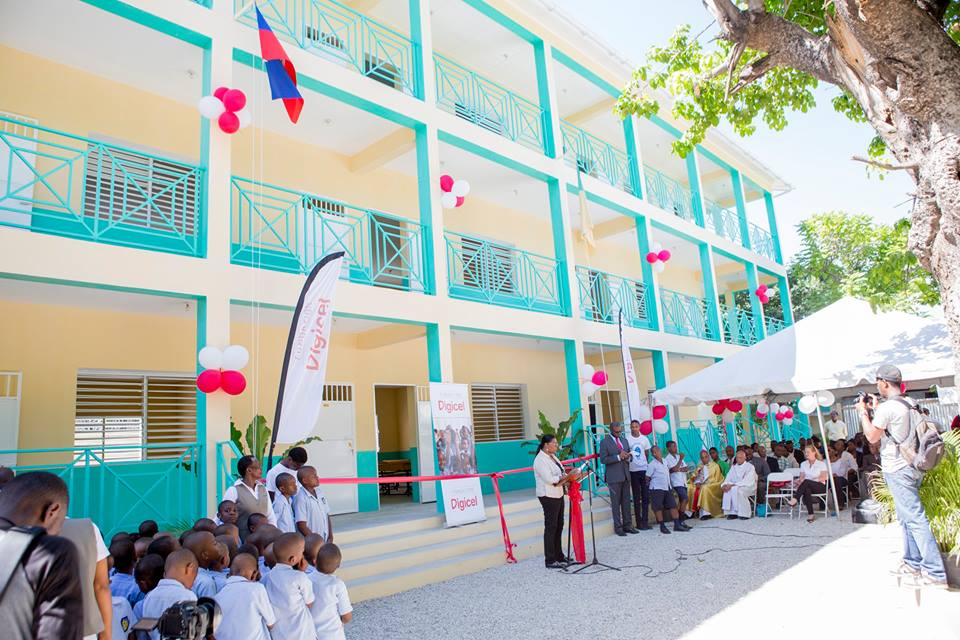

Location
- Port-au-Prince, Haiti
- Coordinates: 18.548°N 72.336°W

Information
- Type: Private
- Motto: A force, a tradition, a family
- Religious affiliation: Roman Catholic
- Established: 1865
- Grades: 1 to 12
- Gender: Boys
- Age: 5 to 18/19
- Language: French
- Color: Yellow/green
- Website: saintmartial.edu.ht

Petit Séminaire Collège Saint-Martial (founded in 1865) is an all-boys Catholic school located in Port-au-Prince, the capital of Haiti. The school is under the control of the Holy Ghost Fathers.

== History ==
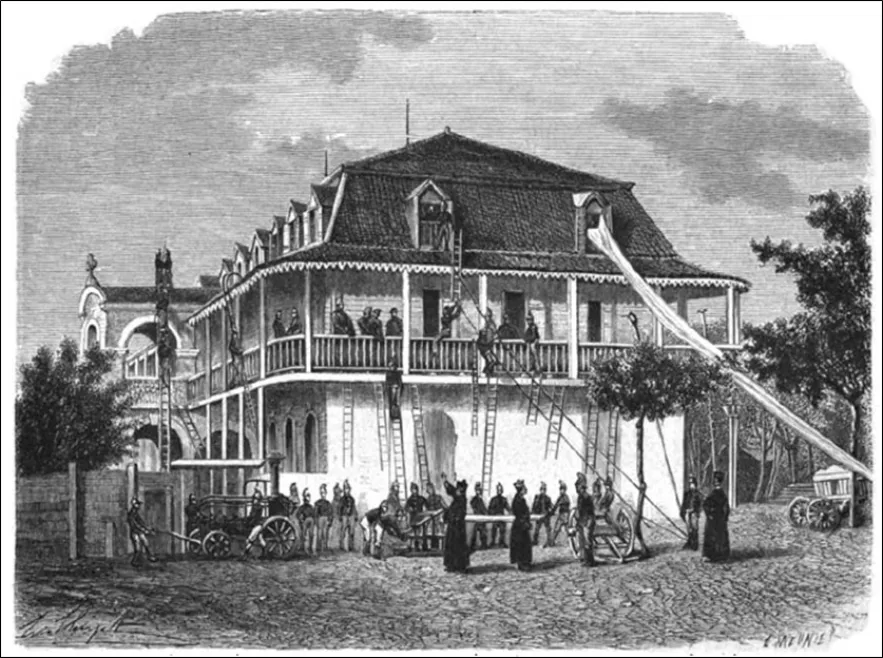
Petit Séminaire Collège Saint-Martial à Port-au-Prince, Hubert Clerget (1879)

The Concordat signed by Haiti and the Vatican in 1860 led to the school being established in 1865. Monsigneur Testard du Cosquer, of the Spiritans, acquired rights and devoted it as part of his ministry as an academic and religious school: a young institution in a young country. According to Spencer St. John, the British consul in Haiti, Saint-Martial was the best school in the country.

Just four years after the first cinematograph was patented by the Lumière brothers, the Martial held the first motion picture projection in Haiti on 19 December 1899.

Father Daniel Weick, formed the first fire brigade in the country, and the first weather station was set up together with a National Museum, which opened in 1904.

On 15 August 1969 the Brothers of the Holy Ghost were accused by the government of Francois Duvalier of conniving with illegal political parties. They were expelled from Petit Séminaire College Saint-Martial and exiled. The Spiritans had no more direction over the school until 1995.

Secondary education at PSCSMS is well equipped with archives and libraries, applied-science laboratories, and cleric-scientific staff to help pupils use their conventional knowledge to develop more practical applications, like technology and inventions.

== Earthquake ==
On 12 January 2010, a large earthquake hit Haiti. The school was totally destroyed by it. The three buildings (kindergarten, primary, and secondary school), as well as the learning center for young seminarians and the chapel library and administrative office, were all either damaged beyond repair or completely knocked down. The school resumed operation in April 2010.

== Rebuilding the school ==
As part of the rebuilding effort, the first building of the Junior High section was inaugurated in September 2015.

== April 2024 pillaging ==
During a gang-led attack on the neighboring National Palace which tied up the police on 1 April, fires were set in the school's administrative building. Four cars in the courtyard were completely destroyed by fire, while others were vandalised. Computers, refrigerators, mattresses, inverters, batteries, water purifiers, and solar panels were among the property stolen during the six-hour attack. Those present at the school were eventually able to escape unscathed, and there was no damage to the library (a national heritage site).

== Alumni ==
- Jean-Claude Bajeux, human rights activist
- Marc Bazin, Prime Minister and provisional President of Haiti (1992-1993)
- Patrick Bellegarde-Smith, professor
- Louis Borno, President of Haiti
- Gardy Cadet, engineer and scientist, former chairman of H.A.E.S
- Jude Célestin, politician and mechanical engineer
- Martial Célestin, first Haitian prime minister
- Fritz Daguillard, writer
- Louis-Philippe Dalembert, writer
- Philippe Dodard, painter
- Hugues Gentillon, Filmmaker, medical researcher, conceptual artist, philanthropist
- Joseph Jérémie, writer
- Chibly Langlois, First Haitian cardinal
- François-Wolff Ligondé, former archbishop of Port-au-Prince
- Charles Moravia, poet and playwright
- Alexandre Paul, Haitian consul in Miami
- René Préval, 51st and 54th President of Haiti (1996-2001), (2006-2011)
- Lyonel Trouillot, poet and writer
- Pierre Vernet, Haitian linguist and educator
- Etzer Vilaire, poet and lawyer
- Philippe Vorbe, soccer player
