= Antoine Adrien =

Haitian Catholic priest and theologian

Antoine Adrien (1922 – 13 May 2003) was a Catholic priest and liberation theology advocate who served as Father Superior of the Holy Ghost Order in Haiti. He also served as Director of the "Petit Séminaire Collège Saint-Martial", attended primarily by children of the country's elite. Adrien was expelled from Haiti in 1969 by the Francois Duvalier regime which accused the Holy Ghost Order of harboring communists working to overthrow the regime.

Along with Father Jean-Marie Vincent who was assassinated in 1994, Antoine Adrien is credited by former Haitian president and Catholic priest Jean-Bertrand Aristide as having laid the groundwork for much of the liberation theology activism which led to his watershed election as the first democratically elected President of Haiti.

== Exile (1969-1987) ==
During his exile post 1969, Adrien ministered to the Haitian community in New York, was active in organizations such as the Haitian Centers Council (HCC) in the 1980s and the National Coalition for Haitian Rights (NCHR) but returned to Haiti after the fall of Jean-Claude Duvalier i.e. "Baby Doc", François Duvalier's son and successor.

He coalesced with "The Haitian Fathers", the group of Holy Ghost priests who had been exiled along with him in 1969, at 333 Lincoln Place in Brooklyn.

In the early 1980s, Adrien—then settled in Brooklyn—denounced discriminatory policies against Haitian refugees under the Carter administration along with Father Gérard Jean-Juste of Miami. At a protest in front of the White House in 1980, Adrien said the following in a speech: "For eight years Haitian refugees have been knocking at America's door. Within ten days, 25,000 Cubans have arrived and have been granted everything. We simply cannot understand Mr. Carter."

During anti-Duvalier activist Jean Dominique's exile in New York from 1980 to 1986, he and Adrien met often and worked together on how to raise awareness about the excesses of the Duvalier dictatorship.

== Return to Haiti ==
In 1987, Adrien is credited with having mediated a face-off between the Catholic church hierarchy, Haitian economic elites and the U.S. Embassy on the one hand and youth activists on the other over the planned removal of firebrand liberation theologian priest Jean-Bertrand Aristide from the parish of St-Jean Bosco in Port-au-Prince. Upon announcement that Aristide would be assigned to another parish, youth activists occupied the cathedral in Port-au-Prince and started an unprecedented hunger strike. Father Adrien intervened and convinced the archbishop to reconsider the removal. He had known Aristide for years and had welcome the then student at 333 Lincoln Place in Brooklyn during his exile in New York.

On July 23, 1987, Father Adrien was present at a celebration in memory of the victims of the highly controversial Jean-Rabel Massacre along with Fathers Jean-Bertrand Aristide and Jean-Marie Vincent.

In the historic 1990 election, Aristide is believed to have raced past rival Victor Benoît of FNCD to become the most popular candidate when Antoine Adrien supported his candidacy and his rallying of FNCD and the Ti Legliz (Mini Church) liberation theology movement. As a result, Aristide garnered an easy victory in the presidential election of December 16, 1990, which he allegedly won with 67% of the vote.

== Death ==
Father Adrien died on May 13, 2013, from the complications of a stroke. He had been incapacitated for several years after an earlier stroke in 1996.
