= Johny Joseph =

Johny Joseph may refer to:

- Johny Joseph (civil servant) (born 1949), Indian Administrative Service officer
- Johny Joseph (news anchor) (1964–2009), Haitian academic and journalist
- Kundara Johny (1951–2023), Johny Joseph, Indian actor
