= Pierre Vernet =

Haitian linguist and lexicographer (1943-2010)

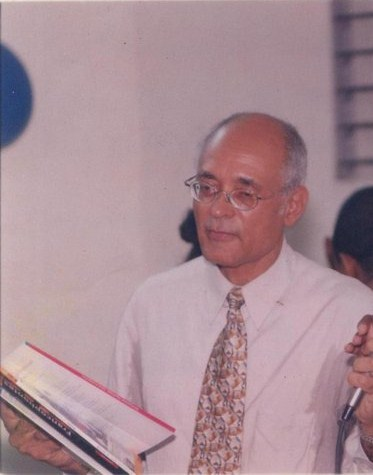
- Born: 21 March 1943; Lascahobas, Haiti
- Died: 12 January 2010 (aged 66); Port-au-Prince, Haiti

Academic background
- Education: Paris Descartes University (PhD)
- Thesis: Langues, éducation et société en Haïti (1984)

Academic work
- Discipline: Linguist
- Sub-discipline: Creole linguistics; Lexicography
- Institutions: Université d'État d'Haïti

Pierre Vernet (21 March 1943 – 12 January 2010) was a Haitian linguist and lexicographer, who created the Center for Applied Linguistics in Port-au-Prince. He was instrumental in standardizing Haitian Creole (Krèyol) spelling as an aid to literacy, and the elaboration of French-Krèyol lexicons of terminology. He also published dictionaries with Alain Bentolila and with Bryant Freeman.

Vernet went to high school at Petit Séminaire Collège Saint-Martial before beginning studies at Paris Descartes University, where he would eventually earn his doctorate.

On 12 January 2010, Vernet died in the 2010 Haitian earthquake, while serving as the dean of the Applied Linguistics department of the Université d'État d'Haïti.

== Bibliography ==
- 1976 : Ti diksyonnè kreyòl–franse, A. Bentolila (dir.), with P. Nougayrol, Ch. Alexandre and H. Tourneux, Port-au-Prince, éd. Caraïbes.
- 1979 : Alphabétisation en Haïti : aspect linguistique, Gerec 4, Centre Universitaire Antilles-Guyane, Études Caribéennes.
- 1980 : Techniques d’écriture du créole haïtien, Port-au-Prince, Le Natal.
- 1980 : "Le créole haïtien face à son introduction en salle de classe : le champ sémantique du corps humain", Études créoles 3/2 : 45–55.
- 1981 : "L’écriture du créole et ses réalités de fonctionnement". Cahiers du Centre de Linguistique appliquée 3 : 1-19.
- 1984 : Langues, éducation et société en Haïti, Université de Paris V, Doctoral Thesis (2 tomes), 661 p.
- 1984 : "La reforme éducative en Haiti. Philosophie, objectifs, stratégies et contenus", Études créoles 7/1-2.
- 1988 : Diksyonè òtograf kreyòl ayisyen, with B.C. Freeman, Port-au-Prince, Sant Lengwistik aplike, Inivèsite Leta Ayiti.
- 1989 : Dictionnaire préliminaire des Fréquences de la langue créole haïtienne, with B.C. Freeman, Port-au-Prince, Sant Lengwistik aplike, Inivèsite Leta Ayiti.
- 1989 : Hommage au Dr. Pradel Pompilus, Port-au-Prince, Sant Lengwistik aplike, Inivèsite Leta Ayiti.
- 1990 : L’enseignement du français en milieu créolophone haïtien. Quelques aspects sociolinguistiques et méthodologiques. Espace créole 7 : 98-149.
- 1990 : Problématique de la recherche terminologique en Haïti. Terminologies nouvelles (Cahiers du Rifal), 3.
- 1991 : With H. Wittmann et R. Fournier Syntaxe descriptive et comparée du créole haïtien. Conseil de recherches en sciences humaines du Canada. Voix plurielles 9.2 (2012)
- 2001 : Leksik elektwomekanik kreyòl, franse, angle, espayòl, with H. Tourneux, Port-au-Prince, Fakilte Lengwistik Aplike, Inivèsite Leta Ayiti.
- 2001 : Analyse du roman / Analiz woman Eritye Vilokan, de Pierre Michel Chéry, Port-au-Prince, Anthropos.
- 2006 : "Trente ans de créolistique. Processus de re-créolisation, décréolisation". In E. Dorismond, F. Calixte et N. Santamaria (éds.), La Caraïbe, entre Histoire et Politique (Recherches Haïtiano-antillaises 4), Paris, L'Harmattan.
- 2008 : "Une Démarche d'adaptation de la didactique du français aux enfants créolophones", In R. Chaudenson (dir.), Didactique du français en milieux créolophones. Outils pédagogiques et formation des maîtres, Paris, L’Harmattan : 249–267.
