= Darfour (surname) =

Darfour is a surname. Notable people with the surname include:

- Felix Darfour (died 1822), Haitian journalist
- Kwakye Darfour (born 1957), Ghanaian politician
