= Haitian hip-hop =

Music genre or scene

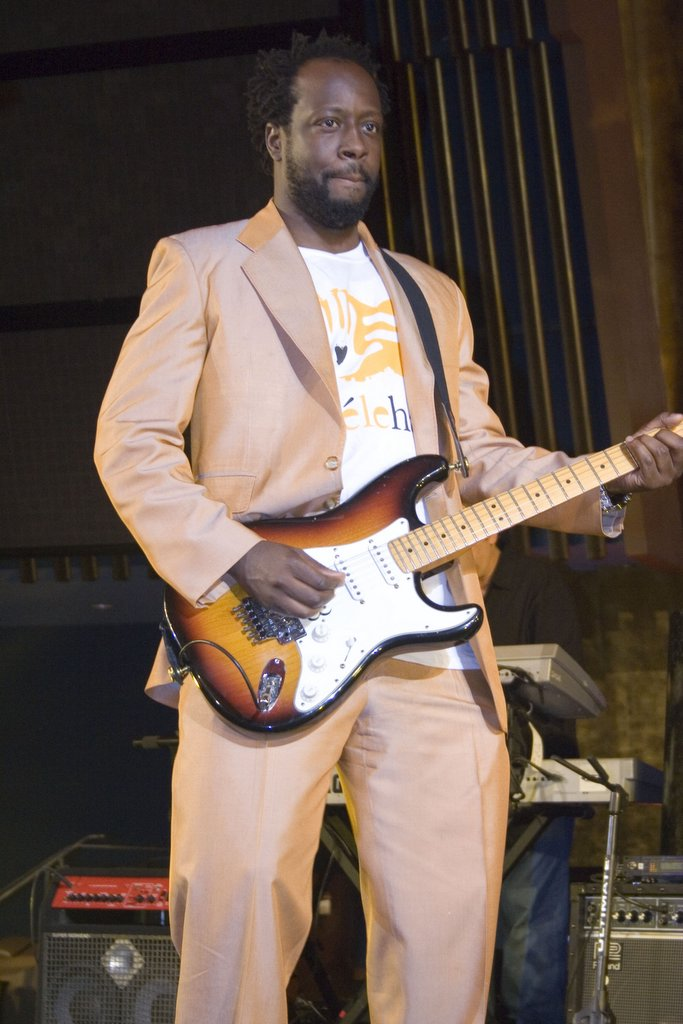
Wyclef Jean, Haitian-American hip-hop artist

Rap Kreyòl started in Haiti in the early 1980s by Master Dji, who witnessed how American hip hop gave birth to French hip hop while living in France. Hence, he moved back to Haiti and started the hip hop movement that took Haiti by storm. Consequently, many of those kids which hip hop spoke to in their special language for the first time continue to rap in Haitian Creole even after being in the United States the most part of their lives. Artists like Oz'mosis and Bennchoumy still rap in Haitian Creole today. Haitian hip-hop was popularized through its unique blend of American hip-hop musical structures, Haitian Creole language, Caribbean rhythmic influences, and an incorporation of Haitian cultural, political, and spiritual traditions.

To many notable artists, Rap Kreyòl functions as a platform for political protest, the expression of Haiti's cultural identity, a tool for mobilizing the youth, and a medium of post-disaster healing.

== History ==
=== Foundations (1980s-1990s) ===
Rap Kreyòl emerged during the final years of the Duvalier family dictatorship, a totalitarian hereditary dynasty that lasted nearly the latter half of the 20th Century. Originally, the youth in Haiti used this new musical idea as a medium of protest. In protest, people rapped in Haitian Creole as opposed to French, and mixed local rhythms with American beats. In the late1980s, Master Dji (George Lys Herard) released songs such as "Vakans" and "Sispann", sparking a movement that would last generations. Early Rap Kreyòl groups and artists established the Haitian hip-hop movement as a medium for political expression, anti-corruption critique, and a tool of democratic mobilization.

Often, hardcore beats are used while the artist raps in Haitian Creole. Rap kreyòl has been part of the Haitian culture since the early 1980s with groups such as Original Rap Staff, King Posee, Rap Kreyòl S.A., Masters of Haiti, Fighters, Blackdo, Fam-Squad, Supa Deno, Prince Berlin, Fantom, Toby Anbakè and Muzion attaining prominence, but lately has become very popular with Haitian youth.

Another notable group from the 1990s is Black Leaders. The impact of Black Leaders and its members is lasting. Though known primarily for his role in Black Leaders, Don Roy is still an active contributor to Haitian music across many genres. Since the peak of his notoriety, Don Roy has chosen to create in other genres. While still working in a production capacity in genres such as Rap Kreyòl and Reggae, Don Roy has chosen to create and work with prominent artists of the modern roots/Rasin movement.

Many Haitian Rap Kreyòl artists have had rough childhoods and difficult living conditions producing rappers who address socio-economic topics in their lyrics. Though similar to mainstream American hip hop in that materialistic imagery is portrayed or lyricized, the negative aspects of less fortunate Haitian society, such as topics concerning slum life, gang warfare, the drug trade, and poverty, are much more.

=== Political engagement and diaspora emergence (1990s-2000s) ===
The late 1990s and the turn of the 20th century resulted in this genre being heavily developed among Haitian youth across Port-au-Prince and urban neighborhoods. Specifically, artists used hip-hop to address poverty, inequality, and corruption, becoming a voice for marginalized communities across Haiti. Additionally, the movement had spread to Haitian-American youth in the United States. A metaphorical network was created between Haiti and the U.S., functioning as a cultural bridge that combined U.S. urban hip-hop culture, Haitian nationalist themes, and Haitian Creole language to emphasize Haitian pride, history, and the rejection of negative stereotypes. Negative stereotypes began to emerge during the 1980s AIDS epidemic after the Haitian Revolution. Rappers such as KRS-One, Talia Keli, Chuck D, Wyclef Jean, Joey Bada$$ have used hip-hop to educate audiences about the revolution's significance and critique the way the U.S. handled it. The Revolution serves as a metaphor for resistance against white supremacy.

==== Haitian American artists ====
- KRS-One: Advocated for teaching Haitian history, collaborated on projects like “Cry for Haiti” (2010) that linked the revolution to modern Haitian struggles. Often critiqued U.S. racism and economic exploitation of Haiti in his music. While not Haitian, he emphasized the historical importance of Haiti in Black freedom struggles.
- Joey Bada$$: Integrates Haitian culture into his music, notably for his music video for “The Light” notably featuring a Vodou ceremony which underlines he connection between Haitian spirituality and empowerment.
- Talib Kweli: Kweli has highlighted Haitian resilience and history, with his lyrics often critiquing foreign policy towards Haiti and challenges people to recognize Haiti's revolutionary legacy.
- Public Enemy (Chuck D): Worked on projects such as “Kombit pou Haiti“ 2010, and “This Bit of Earth”, as well as ”Fight the Power”, which had a recent remake in 2020 which had a resurgence of revolutionary imagery in response to movements like Black Lives Matter. His music served as a call to action against the systemic exploitation Haiti as faced.
- Légendarie: A rap record by Imposs (Stanley Rimsky Salgado), Loud, White-B, Tizzo and Rymz, produced by Banx and Ranx at Joy Ride Records. The lyrics reflect Imposs's realities and aspirations as first-generations Haitian Canadian.

=== Post-earthquake era (2010s-present) ===
In 2010, a devastating Haiti earthquake shocked the nation, affecting an estimated 3 million people and resulting in an approximate death toll of 220,000 to 316,000. As a result, the thematic focus in Haitian hip-hop changed, shifting to the music addressing trauma, state failure, and community rebuilding. The music was used as a way to strengthen mutual aid networks and promote collective fundraising. This resulted in a massive expansion of the underground hip-hop movement in Haiti, specifically in majorly affected communities, and artists began to emphasize political authenticity over commercial appeal.

== Societal and cultural impact ==
=== Political protest tradition ===
Historically, music has been used (specifically in Haiti) as a means for political protest, with Rap Kreyòl specifically being used to critique political elites, mobilize youth, and promote civic awareness.

=== Cultural identity and language ===
The popular emergence of Rap Kreyòl effectively reinforces Haitian Creole as a national language and Haitian cultural identity has a whole. The music centers on a working-class collectivist identity and incorporates Vodou philosophy, post-slavery communal ethics, and anti-colonial values to reinforce cultural ideals and identity, specifically within marginalized communities.

=== Anti-stereotype resistance ===
Rap Kreyòl is used as a means to counter global portrayals of Haiti as violent, impoverished, or unstable. In many songs, there is a prominent promotion of Haitian flag imagery, national colors, and affirmations of dignity and resilience.

=== Youth empowerment and mutual aid ===
The emergence of Rap Kreyòl has led to collective fundraising across the nation for recording projects, many of which involve the youth, keeping them from other dangers in society. Additionally, this music brings people together, leading to increased resource sharing (food, studio time, housing) that reflects traditional Konbit values of shared work, specifically seen in the musical studios.

== See also ==
- Rabòday
- Rasin
