= Jean-Jacques Pierre =

Haitian footballer (born 1981)

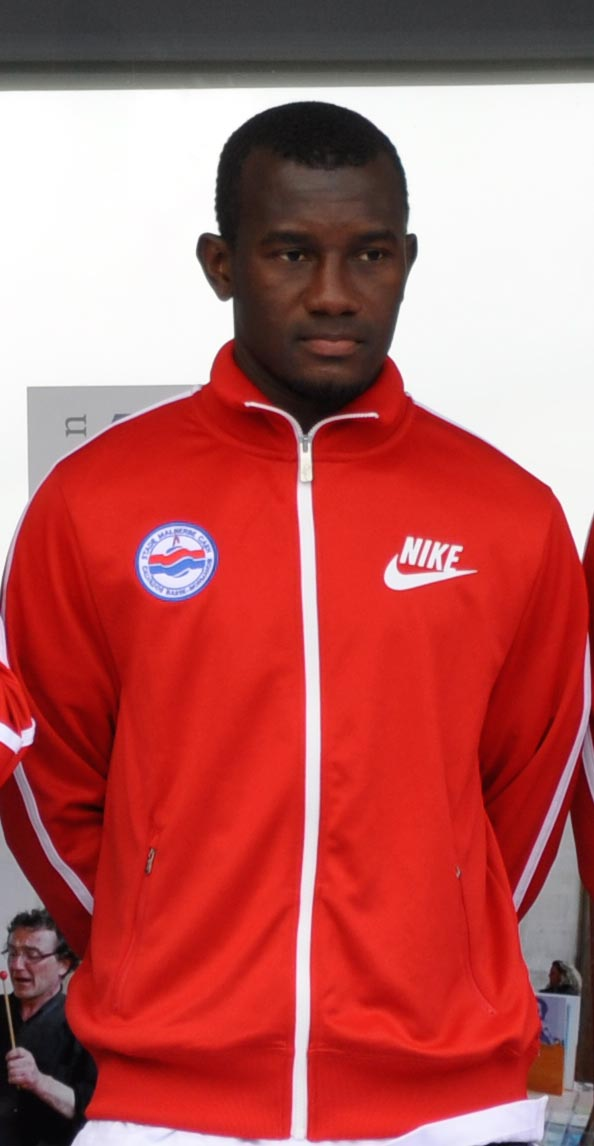
- Pierre with Caen in 2012

Personal information
- Date of birth: 23 January 1981 (age 45)
- Place of birth: Léogâne, Haiti
- Height: 1.80 m (5 ft 11 in)
- Position: Centre-back

Youth career
- 1994–200: Cavaly

Senior career*
Years	Team	Apps	(Gls)
2001–2002	Cavaly	64	(8)
2002–2003	Arsenal de Sarandí	31	(1)
2003–2004	Deportivo Morón	25	(7)
2004–2005	Peñarol	55	(2)
2005–2012	Nantes	143	(4)
2012	Panionios	12	(1)
2012–2015	Caen	28	(1)
2015	Angers	15	(0)
2015–2017	Paris	32	(0)
2017–2018	Granville	7	(0)
2018–2019	MOS Caen		
Total		412	(24)

International career
2001–2015	Haiti	64	(5)

Managerial career
- 2019–2021: AG Caen
- 2021–2023: Haiti
- * Club domestic league appearances and goals

Jean-Jacques Pierre (born 23 January 1981) is a Haitian football coach and former professional footballer who played as a centre-back. He is the former head coach of the Haiti national team.

== Club career ==
Born in Léogâne, Pierre began his career in the youth ranks of Haitian club Cavaly. After impressing with the island club, Pierre moved to Argentina, joining Arsenal de Sarandí. After one season with Arsenal, Pierre joined Deportivo Morón and went on to score seven goals as a defender. His play with Morón earned him a move to historic Uruguayan side Peñarol. While with Peñarol, Pierre was a regular starter for the club and also featured during the Copa Libertadores. He was voted as the best defender of the Uruguayan championship in 2004–05.

In August 2005, he joined French club Nantes. Upon joining Nantes, Pierre quickly became a first team regular. He made his debut for Nantes on 10 September 2005 in a 1–0 loss to Troyes AC. In six seasons in France, he appeared in 143 league matches (including 68 Ligue 1 matches) and scored 4 goals.

== International career ==
Pierre was the captain of the Haiti national under-23 football team and emerged as an important player for the full national squad. He made his full national team debut in a December 2001 friendly match against El Salvador and was a Haiti squad member at the 2002 and 2007 Gold Cups. He played in two World Cup qualifying matches in 2004. According to the Haitian press, on 25 March 2009, Pierre announced his retirement from the national side, citing false accusations against him and that he was not as much valued in the national team as he was with Nantes. However, he returned to the national team and participated in 2010 World Cup qualifying.

== Managerial statistics ==
As of matches played 28 March 2023

Managerial record by team and tenure
Team	From	To	Record								Ref
Team	From	To	G	W	D	L	GF	GA	GD	Win %	Ref
Haiti	March 2021	April 2023	19	12	1	6	52	25	+27	63.16	
Career totals			19	12	1	6	52	25	+27	63.16	

== Honors ==
Haiti

- Caribbean Cup bronze: 2014

== See also ==
- List of foreign Ligue 1 players
- List of foreign Super League Greece players
- List of Haitians
