= Olin Pierre-Louis =

Haitian, Roman Catholic parish priest in San Juan, Puerto Rico

Olin Pierre-Louis Noelsaint is a Haitian Catholic priest in San Juan, Puerto Rico. He is known for providing support and advocating for Haitian and Dominican immigrants in Puerto Rico. As of 2026, he is the pastor of Church of San Mateo de Cangrejos of Santurce in Santurce.

== Biography ==
Olin Pierre Louis Noelsaint is originally from Haiti. Pierre Louis' first language is Haitian Creole.

He arrived in Puerto Rico in 2000. He was ordained by Archbishop Roberto González Nieves of San Juan de Puerto Rico on 24 March 2009. In July 2015, Pierre Louis was named the parish priest of Iglesia Nuestra Señora de la Providencia in San Juan. As of 2026, he is the pastor of Church of San Mateo de Cangrejos of Santurce in Santurce.

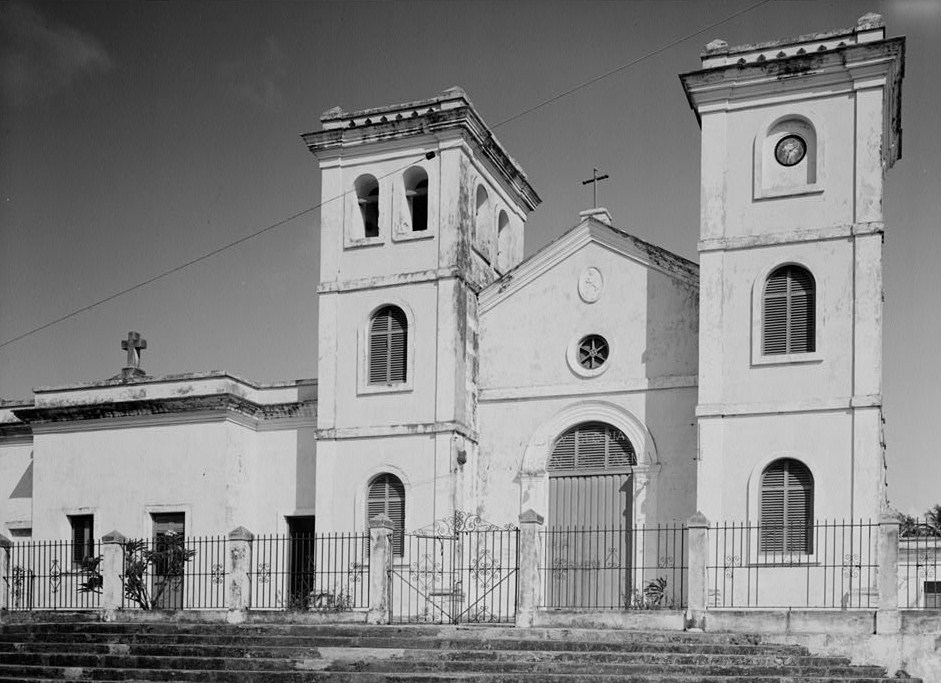
Iglesia San Mateo de Cangrejos, Northwest of Calle San Jorge at Calle San Mateo in Santurce (a barrio) of San Juan (a municipality), in Puerto Rico)

In 2014, he reported that his church received approximately 600 Haitian immigrants as they were en route to the United States and Francophone regions of Canada. He is also an advocate for the Dominican immigrant population in Puerto Rico. Louis houses Haitian migrants and raises money uses his congregation to raise money to purchase tickets to Miami and New York.

== See also ==
- List of Haitians
- Catholic Church in the United States
