= Jean-Fernand Brierre =

Jean-Fernand Brierre (28 September 1909 – 1992) was a Haitian poet, dramatist, journalist, and diplomat. He is recognized "as one of the most brilliant Haitian writers," and has produced a significant body of poetry to his credit. He also served as Haiti's ambassador to Argentina.

== Early years ==
Brierre was born in Jérémie to Fernand Brierre and Henriette Desrouillère. He descended from a French settler, François Brierre, who had bought at auction, in Saint-Domingue (Haiti) a black Dahomean woman, named Rosette, sister of Marie-Cessette Dumas, who also gave birth to the general Thomas-Alexandre Dumas in Jérémie, who later fathered the great French novelist, Alexandre Dumas.

== Career ==
Brierre became the director of École normale de Chatard of rural teachers in 1928 at age nineteen. Brierre was appointed thereafter, at 21, as secretary of legation in Paris where he took courses in political science. In 1931, he began studying law and completed his courses in 1935. He was head of Cultural Division of the Minister of Foreign Affairs, director of the Tourism Bureau and then under-secretary of state of the Ministry of Tourism. Brierre was also a member of the government council and was named ambassador of Haiti to Buenos Aires. Brierre worked as a politician and diplomat. He emerged in the 1930s as a poet and militant in the backlash against the United States occupation of Haiti (1915–34). His epic verse celebrated the heroes of Haitian independence and the black race. His Black Soul (1947) and La Source (1956) are well-known Haitian examples of the poetry of négritude. In 1932, Brierre founded the newspaper "La Bataille", where its criticism against the regime of Sténio Vincent and the American occupation earned him two years of closed detention in the national penitentiary.

Brierre was also an educator and diplomat until his exile in 1962, after nine months of prison under the regime of François Duvalier. He lived most of his exile in Senegal, and returned to Haiti after the fall of Jean-Claude Duvalier, the son. Brierre died in Port-au-Prince on the night of December 24 to 25, 1992, at the age of 83. Jean-François Brierre remains with Etzer Vilaire, as one of the most famous poets of Jérémie; nicknamed "The City of Poets."

== Selected works ==
- Chansons Secrètes (1933)
- Black Soul (1947)
- Les Aïeules (1954)
- Province (1954)
- La nuit (1955)
- La Source (1956)
- Images d'Or (1959)
- Découverte (1960)
- Aux Champs pour Occide (1960)
- Essai sur l'Union soviétique ancienne: Un autre Monde (1973)
- Un noël pour Gorée (1980)
- Sculpture de proue (1983)
