= Oswald (musician) =

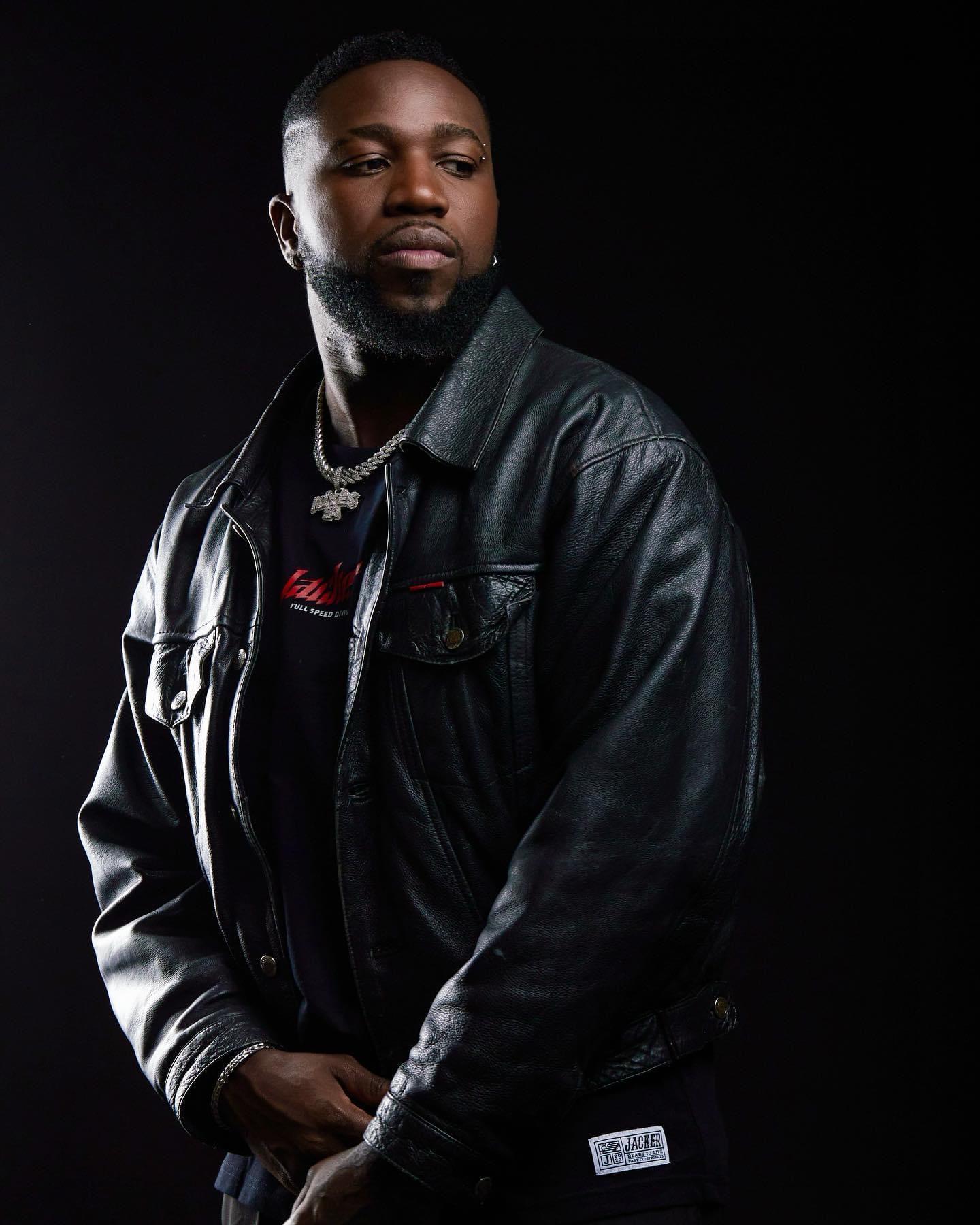

Background information
- Also known as: Oswald SXM
- Born: Oswald Clerveus; May 19, 1989 (age 37); Saint Martin
- Origin: Haiti
- Genres: Compas, Zouk, Soul, RnB
- Occupations: Musician, composer
- Years active: 1998–present

Oswald Clerveus (born May 19, 1989) is a singer and songwriter of Haitian descent. Born in Saint Martin, Oswald has been passionate about music since early childhood. He is best known for his love songs and songs dedicated to women.

== Biography ==
=== Early life and education ===
Oswald Clerveus was born on May 19, 1989 in Saint Martin. At the age of 13, he faced a tragedy. He became an orphan and was forced to live in a foster family.

=== Career ===
Passionate about music from a young age, Oswald began writing lyrics to express his feelings. It was a way for him to externalize his emotions. In 2007, he won the "Le Défi Lycéen" singing competition in Guadeloupe, representing the island of Saint Martin. This victory allowed him to perform alongside artists such as Tanya St Val and Dominik Coco at a George Benson tribute concert. That same year, he decided to produce his first demo, "My Life," composed of four R&B/Soul tracks recorded at Yard Studio.

In 2008, he was discovered by Michel Mado (a renowned Guadeloupean pianist and composer), who was very impressed by his talent. He performed a track on Mado's album, "Dédicace", and Mado declared he had discovered "a golden nugget." In 2010, the young singer decided to release two singles: "Nan Lanmou laj pa ekziste" and "Ton absence," a duet with Misty Jean. The first single, a blend of zouk and konpa, paid homage to Oswald's Haitian roots and enjoyed some success. Played on several radio stations, including NRJ, MFM, and Tropiques FM, it was particularly popular in the United States.

== Discography ==
=== Studio albums ===
- OSWALD (2011)
- Option (2021)
- Oxygen (2024)

=== Singles ===
- Sylvani (2025)
- Ou fèm vakabon (2024)
- Kraze (2024)
- Pedi kontwol (2024)
- Oxygen (2024)
- Dimension (2024)
- No Love (2024)
- Pasyans ave’m (2024)
- Ton anniversaire (2024)
- Come Over (2024)
- Ai confiance (2024)
- Boule yon kob (2024)
- Ken (2024)
- C’est le but (2024)
- Mawozo (2022)
- Solo (2022)
- Ghetto Girl Wine (2022)
- T'en aller (2021)
- Suc (2021)
- First Night (2021)
- Toxic (2021)
- Option (2021)
- C'est nous (2021)
- I Can't Let You Go (2021)
- Ride It (2021)
- Pour ma fille (2021)
- Fè yo wè (2021)
- Rete avèm (2021)
- Ti doudou (2021)
- Sur un Carreau (2020)
- Tourner le dos (2018)
