= Félix Darfour =

Haitian journalist

Félix Darfour or Darfur (died 1822) was a Haitian journalist and newspaper editor. Born in the Sultanate of Darfur and educated in France, Darfour moved to Haiti with his wife in 1818 and shortly after founded his newspaper L’Avertisseur haytien. He used the paper to criticize government policies, which he described as discriminating against Black Haitians, and racism in both the world at large and Haitian society. In August 1822, he addressed the Chambre des Communes with a petition calling for reform and criticizing president Jean-Pierre Boyer and his government. In response, the Boyer government accused him of sedition and had Darfour arrested, tried, and executed by firing squad within days of his address. The incident became known as the Darfour affair.

== Early life ==
Originally from Darfur, Félix Darfour moved to France as a child, where he was raised and educated. According to historian Délide Joseph, Darfour was brought to France by a French general. He lived in the country for around 20 years, before moving to Port-au-Prince, Haiti, in 1818. According to Beaubrun Ardouin, Darfour was married to a French woman who moved with him to Haiti; French historian Robert Cornevin believes that Darfour was likely a well-read man who may have had experience working in the French newspaper industry. He became a citizen of Haiti after settling there and worked as a lawyer and surveyor.

== Career and L’Avertisseur haytien ==
Shortly after his arrival in Haiti, Darfour founded his own newspaper: L’Eclaireur haytien, ou Le Parfait patriote. Its first edition was printed in that August. Darfour, an early believer in the unification of African people, Darfour referred to Haitians as "Africans" in the early editions of his paper and was critical of the Haitian government. A few months into printing L’Eclaireur haytien, at the end of 1818 or in January 1819, Darfour changed the paper's name to L’Avertisseur haytien (transl. Haitian Alarm) and became even more critical of the government and various aspects of Haitian society. In the paper, which was printed three times and month and mostly featured contributions from Darfour, he argued against anti-Black racism he saw in the country; Darfour believed that the Mulatto Haitians were treated as elite in Haitian society and condemned the government for not putting Black Haitians in positions of power.

Although Darfour was a republican, his works lacked any criticism of Haiti's former monarch Henri Christophe, and he spoke out against France. He advocated for an effective chamber of commerce, leading to public interest in Haiti's "moribund" chamber.

Darfour also argued against racism in general: he described the belief that Africans were inferior as a political invention by Europeans who wished to justify the practice of slavery. An article he published on the subject in 1818 drew attention from wider Haitian society; that and his sparring with opponent Jules Solime Milscent over government policies and their respective views on race in Haitian society made him known as "someone who stirred up black unrest against the government" and he became an elite, though controversial, member of Haitian society.

== Execution ==
On 30 August 1822, Darfour addressed the Chambre des Communes. He read what a Victor Schœlcher called a "fiery" petition listing "the grievances which the noirs had against the government of the jaunes". Darfour accused Jean-Pierre Boyer's government of discriminating against Black Haitians and privileging Mulatto Haitians. He referenced recent concession by the Haitian government to keep tariffs low on French and English goods; middle class traders in Haiti feared foreign competition and advocated for high tariffs. Darfour too was critical of the tariff policy and opposed what he viewed as European reach in Haiti. Darfour believed the Haitian government was not doing enough to protect local Black merchants and accused Boyer of "handing the country to the whites" (livrer le pays aux blancs). He called for reforms; namely, proposals to integrate Black Haitians in government and prevent discrimination against them.

Pushback against Darfour by Boyer for criticising his government was immediate; the official report in Le Telegraphe accused Darfour of "agitating a conspiracy" and Boyer described Darfour as a "new Cristophe". Though Darfour was not a soldier, he was arrested by Boyer's government for sedition and tried before a military tribunal the following day. The tribunal found him guilty for creating "discord" and he was sentenced to death; a firing squad executed him on 2 September 1822, just a few days later. Boyer and his supporters went further, arresting and expelling those in government who had advocated for Darfour's petition to be read, banishing them from Port au Prince. He also arrested members of the opposition and Joseph Balthazar Inginac, Boyer's secretary general, said Darfour had been provoking "colour divisions".

The incident became known as the Darfour affair and attracted attention in both Haiti and the United States. Boyer's domestic image was harmed, and enemies he made during the incident continued to work against him in the 1830s. Haiti's image abroad was also hurt; American abolitionist Benjamin Lundy, though he said the Haitian government acted improperly in the affair, described American newspaper coverage as overly critical of the Haitian government and racist.
