= Gérard Pierre-Charles =

Haitian economist (1935–2004)

- Born: December 18, 1935; Jacmel, Haiti
- Died: October 10, 2004 (aged 68); Havana, Cuba
- Education: National Autonomous University of Mexico
- Occupations: Politician; economist; author; academic
- Known for: Leader of the Unified Party of Haitian Communists
- Political party: Unified Party of Haitian Communists
- Spouse: Suzy Castor
- Children: 3 sons and 1 daughter

Gérard Pierre-Charles (December 18, 1935, Jacmel – October 10, 2004, Cuba) was a Haitian politician and former leader of the Unified Party of Haitian Communists. Pierre-Charles was also an economist and author.

In his youth, he worked at a cement plant in Port-au-Prince and organized a union there. In 1959, he helped found an underground Marxist party and went into exile in Mexico the following year. He studied economics there and subsequently taught at the National Autonomous University of Mexico. Pierre-Charles helped organize the Unified Party of Haitian Communists. After the overthrow of Jean-Claude Duvalier, he returned to Haiti in 1986. He supported Jean-Bertrand Aristide, who was elected president of Haiti in 1991 but then went into exile after he was deposed by the military. Soon after Aristide's return in 1994, Pierre-Charles became one of his most vocal critics. Aristide's supporter's burnt Pierre-Charles' house down.

Pierre-Charles married Suzy Castor; the couple had three sons and one daughter.

He died of heart failure in Havana where he had come to receive medical treatment.

== Bibliography ==
- Gérard Pierre-Charles (1988). Capital transnacional y trabajo en el Caribe. Plaza y Valdes. ISBN 978-968-856-161-4.
- Gérard Pierre-Charles (1 January 1999). Haití: pese a todo la utopía. Siglo XXI. ISBN 968-23-2172-7.
