= Rulx Léon =

Haitian physician, historian, and journalist

Rulx Léon (Les Cayes, December 2, 1890 – 1984) was a Haitian physician, historian, and journalist. Doctor Léon was "one of the most respected Haitian scholars." He was the author of a documentary on the history of Haiti entitled Propos d'Histoire d'Haïti (1945/1974).
