= Lilas Desquiron =

Lilas Desquiron (born 1946) is a Haitian-born writer and ethnologist. From 2001 to 2004, she served as Minister of Culture and Communications in the government of Jean-Bertrand Aristide.

She was born in Port-au-Prince; her family came from Jérémie. From 1966 to 1970, she studied ethnology in Brussels and Paris, specializing in Afro-American religions. She later returned to France.

== Works ==
- Racines de voudou, essay (1990)
- Les chemins de Loco-Miroir, novel (1990), translated into English as Reflections of Loko Miwa (1998)
