= Marilise Neptune Rouzier =

Biologist and ethnobotanist

Marilise Neptune Rouzier (born 1945) is a Haitian writer, biologist and ethnobotanist. In addition to her publications, she also served as consultant to the Parc de Martissant botanical garden's collection of medicinal plants in Port-au-Prince.

== Publications ==
- "Petit guide médicinal du jardin", World Bank (1997?).
- "Plantes médicinales d'Haïti : description, usages et propriétés"; Éditions Regain, 1998; Éditions de l'Université d'État d'Haïti, 2014.
- "La médecine traditionnelle familiale en Haïti : Enquête ethnobotanique dans la zone métropolitaine de Port-au-Prince"; Éditions de l'Université d'État d'Haïti, 2008.
- "Diabète et hypertension artérielle : Remèdes familiaux dans la région de Port-au-Prince"; Éditions de l'Université d'État d'Haïti, 2012.
- "Médecine familiale, point de jonction pour l’intégration de la médecine traditionnelle et de la médecine conventionnelle", Haiti Perspectives, v1 #3, December 2012
