= Ericq Pierre =

Ericq Pierre (born 1945?) is a Haitian economist working for the Inter-American Development Bank. He was unsuccessfully nominated as prime minister by President René Préval in 1997 and 2008.

Pierre lives in Washington, D.C., where the Inter-American Development Bank is based, and is an advisor for the Bank regarding Haiti. In the midst of a political crisis following the resignation of Prime Minister Rosny Smarth, Pierre was nominated as prime minister by President Préval in 1997, but the Chamber of Deputies rejected the nomination on August 26, 1997, with 43 votes against him, nine in favor, and eight abstaining. Pierre's inability to demonstrate that his grandparents were of Haitian nationality by presenting their birth certificates and his support for an economic plan that involved privatization and large-scale lay-offs of state employees contributed to his defeat.

After Prime Minister Jacques-Édouard Alexis was defeated in a vote of no confidence on April 12, 2008, Préval nominated Pierre as prime minister for a second time on April 27, 2008. In Les Cayes on May 5, leaders of the riots against high food prices that had occurred in April demanded that a new prime minister and government be installed within a week, threatening renewed violence if this did not happen.

The Senate approved Pierre's nomination on May 7, with 17 votes in favor, two abstentions and none opposed. The nomination still had to be approved by the Chamber of Deputies. In an Associated Press interview, Pierre emphasized the need for long-term strategies to deal with the deepening poverty caused by rising food prices.

The Chamber of Deputies rejected Pierre's nomination on May 12; there were 51 votes against him and 35 in favor, with nine deputies abstaining. As a result, Préval had to nominate someone else. Opposition deputy Levaillant Louis Jeune said that the deputies "didn't really believe in the plan that he had for the people of this country". Additionally, as in 1997, questions arose about Pierre's nationality documents.

Speaking at the Hotel Montana in Port-au-Prince on May 15, Pierre alleged that corrupt deputies had prevented his nomination from succeeding because he had been unwilling to negotiate with them and satisfy their demands for money, projects, and positions in the government. He was dismissive regarding the nationality issue.
