= Master Dji =

Haitian hip-hop artist (1961–1994)

George Lys Herard (May 30, 1961 – May 21, 1994), known by his stage name Master Dji, was a Haitian rapper, hip-hop artist, and DJ for the group Haiti Rap' N Ragga, who was a prominent figure in the development of Creole hip-hop. He is best known for his debut album Master Dji, released in the late 1980s. Herard was also a radio host at Radio Métropole and Tropic FM.

== Career ==
Herard was a versatile rapper, able to perform in English, French and Creole. His track "Vakans" (1982) was one of the first rap songs in Creole. In the late 1980s he released his first album, Master Dji.

His second album, Politik Pam, was released in 1990 on Bwa Patat Records. His third album Match La Red, with his group Haiti Rap' N Ragga, was released on Declic Communication in France. His fourth and final album, again with his group, was Maximum Respect, released on Cross Over Records in Florida. He died on May 21, 1994

== Posthumous career ==
Herard's track "Tann pou tann" won the first prize at the annual African Haitian Video Awards, held from April 27 to May 7, 1995, and organized by Disques Hibiscus and the music television channel MusiquePlus. The video was directed by Herard and Jean-Pierre Grasset.

From May 20 to May 22, 2005, Rapforum organized a summit named Master Dji in Herard's honor, which was held at Place Jérémie.
