= Patrick Janvier =

Haitian footballer (born 1984)

Personal information
- Date of birth: November 18, 1984 (age 41)
- Place of birth: Haiti
- Position: Striker

Senior career*
Years	Team	Apps	(Gls)
2008–2009	Grecia FC		
2010–2011	LDU Portoviejo		

International career
2004	Haiti	1	(0)
2009	Haiti	1	(0)
- * Club domestic league appearances and goals

Patrick Janvier (born 18 November 1984) is a Haitian footballer, who last played for the LDU Portoviejo of the Ecuadorian Serie B.
