= Pierre Valmera =

Haitian basketball player

Personal information
- Born: September 29, 1981 (age 45) Port-au-Prince, Haiti
- Listed height: 6 ft 8 in (2.03 m)
- Listed weight: 250 lb (113 kg)

Career information
- High school: Collège Nicolas Copernic (Port-au-Prince)
- College: Union University
- NBA draft: 2003: undrafted
- Position: Center
- Number: 44, 14

Career history
- 2008–2009: BC Boncourt (Switzerland)

Pierre "Pierry" Valmera (born September 29, 1981) is a retired Haitian professional basketball player, who played for Ancien in the Ligue Nationale de Basket in Switzerland.

== Early years ==
Valmera was born in Port-au-Prince, Haiti. Having taught himself basketball in his native country, he emigrated to the United States and became a standout player at Union University in Tennessee.

== Personal life ==
When Valmera's playing career concluded, he relocated to Boston, Massachusetts where he worked as a substitute teacher in French and history at a middle school. Soon after his arrival in the states, he met David Franklin Rose, a business owner of an architecture firm. Together, they founded a non-for-profit organization called POWERforward International Inc., created to help young Haitians gain private-school educations in the United States through basketball. He is a philanthropist and donates his time and money to develop basketball in Haiti. He has 38 kids in the US on full basketball scholarships, including 6 college graduates and 1 playing for the Sacramento Kings, Skal Labissiere. Some of his other students go to the top schools in the country, like Mississippi State and Vanderbilt University.
