= Marlène Rigaud Apollon =

Haitian educator and writer (born 1945)

Marlène Rigaud Apollon (born May 23, 1945) is a Haitian educator and writer who has been living in the United States since 1964.

She was born in Cap-Haïtien and was educated at the Institution du Sacré-Cœur de Turgeau in Port-au-Prince, going on to earn a BA from the University of Maryland and a MS in from Towson University. She has taught French and French literature at the primary, secondary and university levels.

Her work has appeared in the periodicals Sapriphage, Utah Foreign Language Review and River City. Her story "Manman pas kite yo koupe janm mwen, Mommy, don’t let them cut my leg" was included in the anthology Haïti Rising (2010).

== Selected works ==
- I Want to Dance, poetry (1996)
- Si je n’avais que des regrets, poetry (1997)
- The Moon’s a Banana, I am me (1998)
- Haiti Trivia, youth non-fiction (1998), in English, French and Creole
- Haitian Art Trivia, youth non-fiction (2002), in English and Creole
- Elle s’appelait Elizabeth: L’histoire de Mère Marie Lange, biography translated into English as Her name was Elizabeth: The Story of Mother Mary Lange (2002)
- Cris de Colère, Chants d’espoir, poetry (2007)
- Louis Mercier, À la Reconquête de l’Idéal haïtien: Une voix d’hier pour aujourd’hui et demain, biography translated into English as Louis Mercier, To Reconquer the Haitian Ideal: A Voice from Yesterday for Today and Tomorrow (2008)
