= Victoire Jean-Baptiste =

Victoire Jean-Baptiste (1861–1923), known as "La Belle Victoire", was a politically influential Haitian woman, mistress to President Florvil Hyppolite and highly influential during his term of office. She had previously been the mistress of Hyppolite's successor, Tirésias Simon Sam, and was granted immunity by him after the death of Florvil Hyppolite.

== Life ==
Victoire Jean-Baptiste was a poor illiterate from the countryside outside Cap-Haïtien. In 1886, she was temporarily the mistress of Tirésias Simon Sam. After this, she was a servant to Geline Hyppolite, spouse of Florvil Hyppolite, and the lover of their son, Chéry Hyppolite.

When Florvil Hyppolite became president in 1889, Victoire Jean-Baptiste was moved to the presidential palace in Port-au-Prince, and after the death of Chery in 1893, she functioned openly as the First Lady of Haiti in official ceremonies. She had a great influence in the affairs of state. The president stated that her will in political matters should be respected: she played a great role in the appointment of offices and was regularly given large sums from the state to her private projects, such as a sugar plantation. In 1894, her support made Tirésias Simon Sam minister of war.

She shared with President Hyppolite the practice of Haitian Vodou and their common origin in the North of Haiti. During Hyppolite's presidency she became the owner of two properties in the North: Bayeux and Pétro and a few houses in Cap-Haïtien.

At the death of Florvil Hyppolite in 1896, she sought refuge at the French embassy. The successor of Hippolyte, however, was Tirésias Simon Sam, who had promised Hyppolite to treat her well because of her service to the state. She settled in Cap-Haïtien with Edward Jerome from Martinique and lived on her fortune. She was given a very bad name in the history of Haiti.

== See also ==
- Marie-Madeleine Lachenais
