= Jean-Marie Vincent =

Jean-Marie Vincent may refer to:

- Jean-Marie-Vincent Audin (1793–1851), was a French Roman Catholic author, journalist, and historian
- Jean-Marie Vincent (philosopher) (1934–2004), French philosopher and political scientist
