= Laurore St. Juste =

Haitian historian

Laurore St. Juste is a Haitian historian who co-authored a book chronicling the Polish Legions' involvement in the Haitian Revolution, entitled Présence Polonoaise en Haiti (1983).
