= Alonzo Holly =

Haitian doctor and diplomat

Dr. Alonzo Potter Burgess Holly (1865–1943) was a Haitian doctor and diplomat. He served as Haiti's consul to the Bahamas in the 1890s. He later moved to Florida where he became President of the Florida State Medical Association.

== Early life and education ==
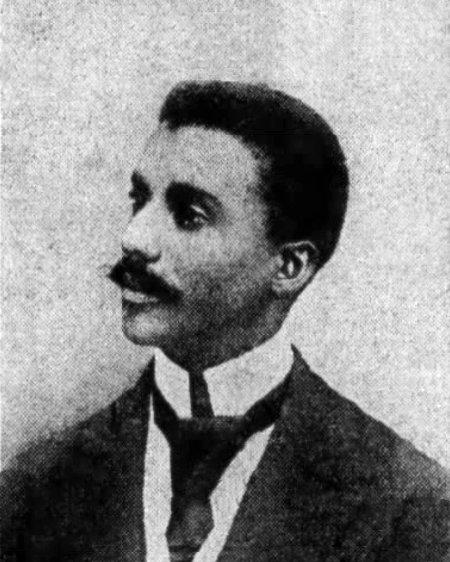
Alonzo P. B. Holly (1905)

Holly was born on 21 September 1865 in Port-au-Prince Haiti. He was the son of James Theodore Holly. The older Holly was the first black Episcopal bishop. He had emigrated to Haiti from the United States. In Haiti, he was the founder of the Orthodox Apostolic Church.

Alonzo Holly attended the Lycée Petion, followed by Harrison College in Barbados and the Queen Elizabeth Grammar School in Atherstone, England, before attending the University of Cambridge where he studied classics and religion. He graduated in 1882 with a bachelor of science degree. He then attended New York Homeopathic Medical College from 1884-1888 where he became the school's first black graduate when he obtained a medical degree in 1888.

== Career ==
He returned to Haiti in 1892 where he ran a public health clinic in Gonaïves and also founded a Mutual Relief Society.

He was Haiti's consul to the Bahamas from 1900 to 1903. He remained in the Bahamas and practised for a time afterwards including becoming the President of the Board of Trustees of the Boynton Normal and Industrial School. He later moved to Florida and continued to practise.

In 1914, he gave a talk to the Interdenominational Ministerial Alliance of Miami on hygiene, which the Florida Metropolis called "so timely and replete with sane suggestions". In 1942, Holly presented a paper at the 12th Homeopathic Pan American Congress a treatment for uterine cancer with which he had had a lot of success for more than a decade. In 1944, his cancer treatment was the subject of a newspaper quiz question.

Holly was President of the Dade County Medical Association, President of the Florida State Medical Association and a fellow of the American Electro-Therapeutic Association.

Holly also continued to advocate for his homeland. In 1886, he criticised statements by British diplomat Sir Spenser St John, who made claims about cannibalism in Haiti, by pointed out that the flaws in St John's statements. Holly was also a correspondent of W. E. B. Debois, advocating for unity amongst Black Americans and Haitians. Holly was also one of the founders of the Patriotic Union of Haiti (L’Union Patriotique d’Haïti), "an organisation modelled after the NAACP".

== Personal life and death ==
Holly died on 28 November 1943. He was 78.

== Awards and honours ==
In 1938, New York Medical College, presented him with a gold diploma.

== Works ==
- Holly, Alonzo Potter Burgess. God and the Negro: Synopsis of God and the Negro; Or the Biblical Record of the Race of Ham. National Baptist Publishing Board, Nashville. 1937.
- Holly, Alonzo P. B.. Malicious Attitude of the Late Arthur Brisbane toward Negro Pointed Out by Dr. A. P. Holly. The Pittsburgh Courier. 9 January 1937. Accessed 21 Jan 2026
- Holly, Alonzo Potter. Our Future Relations with Haiti. Philadelphia, 1931.
- Holly, Alonzo PB. "Galvanism in Gynaecology and in Genito-Urinary Practice." Journal of the National Medical Association 13, no. 3 (1921): 183.
- Holly, Alonzo Potter. The Problems of Our Race: Our Duties and Responsibilities. Nassau, 1903.
- Holly, Dr. Alonzo P. Haiti and Foreign Intervention: Study from the Point of View of International Law. 1902. Printed by H. Chauvet & Co. Accessed 21 Jan 2026
- Holly, Alonzo P. "Haytians Not Cannibals." (1886).
