= Marie-Alice Théard =

Haitian writer (born 1948)

Marie-Alice Théard (born August 3, 1948) is a Haitian writer. She was a recipient of the Editor of the Year Award from the International Writers Association.

== Biography ==
The daughter of Dumont Théard, a pharmacist, she was born in Port-au-Prince. Her father was imprisoned during the Duvalier regime and never recovered; other relatives were imprisoned or executed. She attended École Saint-François-d’Assise primary school and the Lycée Philippe Guerrier, both in Cayes. She continued her education at Christ the King Secretarial School, going on to study hotel management at La Salle Extension University in Chicago and art history and aesthetics at the Institut français en Haïti at Port-au-Prince. Théard also studied public relations and etiquette.

Since 1983, she has been host and curator for Festival Arts in Port-au-Prince, which she helped establish. She also leads seminars on public relations and etiquette. She is host of a weekly cultural television program Kiskeya, l’île mystérieuse.

Théard has completed five of seven volumes of the series Petites histoires insolites, which includes thoughts, essays, poems and short stories.

She married Dr.Jacques Ravix, who is also a writer. The couple had three children.

== Awards ==
She received the Editor of the Year Award in 1999 from the International Writers Association. In 2000, she received the "Woman of the Year" award from the vanity press American Biographical Institute.

== Selected works ==
- Cri du Coeur., poetry (1987)
- Au pays du soleil bleu, poetry (1997)
- Au pays des doubles, poèmes et réflexions, poetry and thoughts (2000)
- Le temps, paroles à dire, récits, essais critiques et poèmes, poetry and essays (2007)
- Star, biographical novel (2016)
