= Suzy Castor =

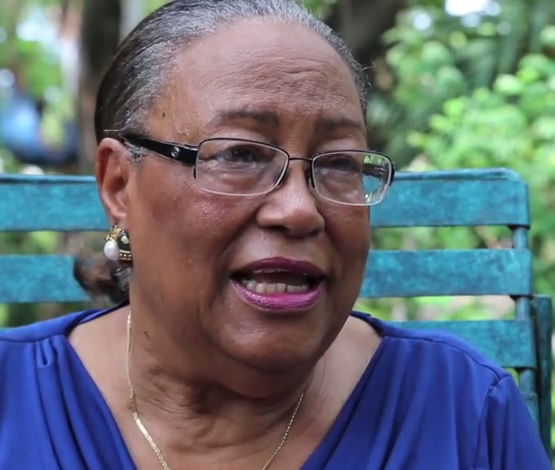
- Born: 1936 (age 89–90); Port-au-Prince, Haiti
- Writing career
- Genre: history

Suzy Castor (born 1936) is a Haitian historian, educator and human rights activist.

She was born in Port-au-Prince and studied social sciences at the École normale supérieure there. In Haiti in 1958 she got a diploma in social sciences from the Higher Normal School of Haiti. Castor earned a PhD in history from the National Autonomous University of Mexico (UNAM). While living in exile in Mexico, she was a professor of political science and of philosophy and letters at UNAM from 1968 to 1986. In the latter year, following the fall of Jean-Claude Duvalier, Castor and her husband Gérard Pierre-Charles returned to Haiti. In the same year, the couple founded the Centre de recherches et de formation économique et sociale pour le développement.

Castor has published six books and over 50 articles in various journals on subjects including the United States occupation of Haiti, relations between Haiti and the Dominican Republic and the women's movement in Haiti.

In 2005, she received the Juan Maria Bandres Prize for the Defense of the Right of Asylum and Solidarity with Refugees. In 2015, she was awarded the Ohtli prize by the government of Mexico.

Castor was a member of Haiti's Popular Entente Party (PEP). The party was founded in 1956.
