= Pauline Brice-Thézan =

Haitian liberal advocator (1843-1893)

Pauline Brice-Thézan (1843-1893) was a Haitian liberal advocator.

Brice-Thézan was the sister and adviser of general Broussais Brice. In 1868, she was imprisoned as a hostage by president Salnave during the civil war. In prison, she managed to help the wife of the rebel Pierre Nord Alexis to escape after she was released. She was given asylum at the French consulate and smuggled out of Haiti. In 1879, she managed to liberate the family of the exiled liberal Boyer Bazelais. In 1883, anti-liberal riots forced her to flee to Jamaica. She was the mother of the women's rights activist Alice Garoute.
