= Gerald Oriol Jr. =

Haitian politician

Secretary of State for the Integration of Persons with Disabilities
- In office October 2011 – April 2016
- In office April 2017 – March 2020

Gerald Oriol Jr., commonly known as Ti Gerald, is known for his advancing the disability agenda in Haiti where he was twice-appointed Secretary of State for the Integration of Persons with Disabilities. He first served under President Michel Martelly from October 2011 to April 2016, and then again, under President Jovenel Moise from April 2017 to March 2020.

== Biography ==
Oriol and his staff at the Office of the Secretary of State for the Integration of Persons with Disabilities (BSEIPH) were tasked with advancing the rights of persons with disabilities in Haiti; improving access to education for children with disabilities; creating economic opportunities for persons with disabilities; promoting the development of a physically accessible environment; and further developing the resources and capabilities of the BSEIPH.

During his tenure in office, Oriol advanced multiple pieces of legislation on disability rights. Soon after his first nomination as Secretary, Oriol and other collaborators followed up with the parliament to have the Law for the Integration of Persons with Disabilities voted in the Senate and promulgated by President Martelly. Oriol and his partners also drafted the bill establishing accessibility standards in Haiti, which was voted in parliament and promulgated by President Moise. Oriol worked on a bill to establish the National Solidarity Fund for the Integration of Persons with Disabilities.

Prior to his first appointment as Secretary of State, Oriol worked for several years as a consultant in the drinking water industry. He is also a shareholder in TECINA SA, a Haitian company specialized in the study and management of construction projects.

In 2006, Oriol co-founded Fondation J’Aime Haiti [I Love Haiti Foundation], a non-profit organization that champions the rights of disabled and disadvantaged youth in Haiti. The organization developed several programs, including Panye Lapè [Hoop for Peace], which aim to contribute to the development of basketball in Haiti.

Oriol received his Bachelor of Science in Business Administration from the University of Florida and his Master of Liberal Arts from Harvard University. He received an Honorary Doctor of Public Service degree from Texas Christian University in December 2017.

Oriol is the recipient of several awards including the 2013 Texas Christian University Global Innovator Award and the Fondation Lucienne Deschamps 2011 Prix Humanitaire.
