= Marie-Madeleine Lachenais =

Politically active and influential Haitian woman (1778–1843)

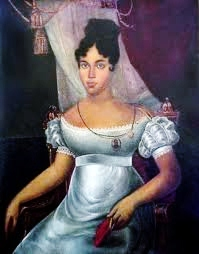
- Born: 1778; Arcahaie, Saint-Domingue
- Died: 22 July 1843 (aged 64–65); Kingston, British Jamaica
- Other name: Joute

Marie-Madeleine Lachenais, known as Joute (Arcahaie, Haiti 1778 – Kingston, Jamaica 22 July 1843), was a politically active and influential Haitian woman. She was the mistress and political advisor of both president Alexandre Pétion and president Jean-Pierre Boyer, and exerted a significant influence over the affairs of state during their presidencies for a period of 36 years (1807–1843). She was called "The President of two Presidents," and regarded to have been the most politically powerful woman in the history of Haiti before the introduction of women's suffrage in 1950.

== Biography ==
Marie-Madeleine Lachenais was the daughter of Marie Thérèse Fabre and the French colonel de Lachenais. She had a relationship with Alexandre Pétion, with whom she had two daughters, Cecile and Hersilie. In 1807, Alexandre Petion became president, and she acted as his adviser. Petion appointed Jean-Pierre Boyer as his successor with her support.

After the installation of Jean-Pierre Boyer in 1818, she functioned as mistress and political advisor to Boyer as well and had a daughter, Azema, with him. Her wishes affected the acts passed in parliament between 1818 and 1840. In 1838, she persuaded Boyer to remain as president when he contemplated stepping down. She also revealed and prevented a planned coup involving Faustin Soulouque.

After the deposition of Boyer in 1843, Lachenais and her daughters, referred to as Boyers family, were escorted to a ship to follow Boyer into exile to Jamaica. She and her daughters lived on a pension from Haiti, which were officially only granted to her daughter Cecile. Boyer is reported to have married her, or to have had plans to marry her, shortly before her death. She died shortly after her arrival in Jamaica.

== See also ==
- Victoire Jean-Baptiste
