= Bryant Freeman =

American academic

Bryant Freeman was a retired emeritus University of Kansas professor. He was primarily known for being the founder and director of the University of Kansas Institute of Haitian Studies, one of the few such institutes in a major university in the United States. Freeman received his Ph.D. in French from Yale University, specializing in the work of Jean Racine.

He had also been an instructor for the United Nations Observers in Haiti, an advisor for U.S. and U.N. Peace-Keeping Forces in Haiti, receiving the protocol rank of Major General.

His awards include:

- Lifetime Achievement Award for Service to the Haitian People
- U.S. Department of Justice Commissioner's Special Service Award
- Kansas Humanities Council Award, Kansas French Educator of the Year
- Woodrow Wilson Fellow, Phi Beta Kappa
- Yale University Fellow, Fulbright Scholar

Among his several publications include one of the most comprehensive dictionaries of Haitian Creole to English (and later English to Haitian Creole) ever made, as well as specialty dictionaries such as medical terminology. He edited a collection of the works of Carrié Paultre, a leading Haitian novelist. He was specifically asked by the U.S. State Department in 2004 to translate a letter written by Jean-Bertrand Aristide, to determine if he had actually stated his resignation.

Among the classes he taught until his retirement in 2006 were French, Haitian Creole (6 courses: beginning to advanced) and Haitian history.

Dr. Freeman's books, including his Haitian-English Dictionary, are available from the KUbookstore. Many of his books are also available for free (along with their audio supplements) on the KU Haitian Creole Resources webpage.

Bryant C. Freeman died February 3, 2024 at age 92.
