= Jean-Baptiste Cinéas =

Jean-Baptiste Cinéas (1895 - 1958) was a Haitian novelist and jurist. Born in Cap-Haïtien, Cinéas held a law degree and was appointed a judge of the Supreme Court of Haiti, a position he held until his death. His most well-known novels are Le Drame de la Terre (1933), La Vengeance de la Terre (1940), L'Héritage Sacré (1945), and Le Choc en Retour (1949).
