= Coupé Cloué =

Haïtian footballer, singer, guitarist, and bandleader

Jean Gesner Henry (10 May 1925 – 29 January 1998), known professionally as Coupé Cloué, was a Haitian footballer, singer, guitarist, and bandleader. He was known for defining a style of Haitian kompa music he called kompa manba, and for the sometimes bawdy innuendo used in his songs. During his career, he was one of Haiti's most prominent musicians, and found much success in West Africa as well.

== Early years ==
As a young man, he received a classical music education and worked as a cabinetmaker before becoming a professional football player. It was from football, playing defense for the Port-au-Prince club Aigles Noirs, that he acquired his nickname, "Coupé Cloué" or "cut and nailed".

He began performing on guitar in 1951, and in 1957 he formed the band Trio Crystal, which he later renamed Trio Select, along with another guitar player and a maraca player. Their first album, one of the dozens Henry released during his career, was released in the late 1960s. In the early 1970s the group expanded from its original three, and renamed itself Ensemble Select. That decade also saw an increase in his use of racy spoken preaching and storytelling in addition to singing during songs; this became one of his trademarks.

In 1978 Coupé Cloué toured extensively in Africa, greatly increasing his international prominence. His popularity in West Africa was especially boosted by similarities between the rhythms and sounds of Henry's music an African soukous music. It was there that Henry earned the nickname, Roi Coupé (or "King Coupé"). During the 1980s and early 1990s, Henry continued to perform and record prolifically.

Henry died of diabetes in January 1998, having only retired from performing the previous month. He was mourned in Port-au-Prince by a day-long outdoor funeral celebration, attended by thousands of people, including the interim Minister of Culture.

== Discography ==
- Plein calle (1970)
- Haïti vol.2 (1971)
- Gro banbou (1972)
- Cribiche (1973)
- Map di (1975)
- Preacher (1977)
- L'Essentiel (1978)
- World of (1979)
- Back to roots (1980)
- Abseloutment (1981)
- Couci-couça (1981)
- En dedans (1982)
- Gaçon Colon (1982)
- 25th anniversaire (1983)
- Antan'n pou antan'n nou (1983)
- Ca fe map peye (1983)
- 5 Continents (1984)
- M^{me} Marcel (1985)
- Malingio (1986)
- Bel mariage (1987)
- Racines (1988)
- Coupe cloue-bèl mè (1989)
- Full tank (1991)
- Femme ce poto fe (1992)
- Ti tete la (1993)
- 40th anniversary (1997)

== In popular culture ==
- The songs "Madame Marcel" and "Papa Loco", was featured in the 1988 film The Serpent and the Rainbow.
