= Alexandre Paul =

Haiti-Utah lawyer and Haitian presidential candidate (2005)

Alexandre Paul was an independent candidate for president in the 2005 Haitian election. Born in Port-au-Prince, he graduated from the Petit Seminaire College St Martial where he spent all his academic years. After the baccalaureat he obtained a degree from the Hautes Etudes Internationales et Diplomatie, a new university. Later, he earn a licence in law. He studied Government and Politics at St. John's University in New York. In 1993, he earned the degree of Juris Doctor at Brigham Young University.

After working at the National Bank for 14 years, Paul was posted to the United Nations as a Minister Consellor where he served for three years. Then he was transferred to the Bahamas where he served six years. Transferred as chargé d'affaires to England and then to Miami, Florida as Consul General and appearing little in public, he was a prominent diplomat and a controversial figure in Miami during his four years there. A staunch supporter of Baby Doc Duvalier, he was ousted from his post when Duvalier fell from power in 1986.

In 1993 he was the head attorney for the electoral counsel (Conseil Electoral Provisoire). He distinguished himself as a person who defended the Haitians by all legal means.

After spending three years as a prisoner in Haiti, he became convinced that the voice of one man could make a difference and ran as a presidential candidate. As a candidate he called for the respect of the laws for the good of all citizens whatever their social status. He wrote many articles in Haitian newspapers: Le Nouvelliste and Le Matin, in the Bahamas in the Nassau Guardian and in Florida in the Miami Herald.

Paul is a member of the Church of Jesus Christ of Latter-day Saints (LDS Church). He joined the church in 1980 when he was Counsel General for Haiti in the Bahamas.

As of 2010 Paul was living in Provo, Utah.

== Notes ==
- "Happy in Haiti celebrating dedication's 20th year", Church News, May 3, 2003
