= Johny Joseph (news anchor) =

Haitian academic and journalist

Johny Joseph (September 27, 1964 – June 23, 2009) was a Haitian academic and journalist.

Joseph was born in Gonaïves. He was news anchor for Télévision Nationale d'Haïti (HPN) from 1988 until 1990.

Joseph died of cancer at the l'hôpital du Canapé-Vert in Port-au-Prince, Haiti, on June 23, 2009, at the age of 45.
