= Peggy Brunache =

Haitian American food historian and archaeologist

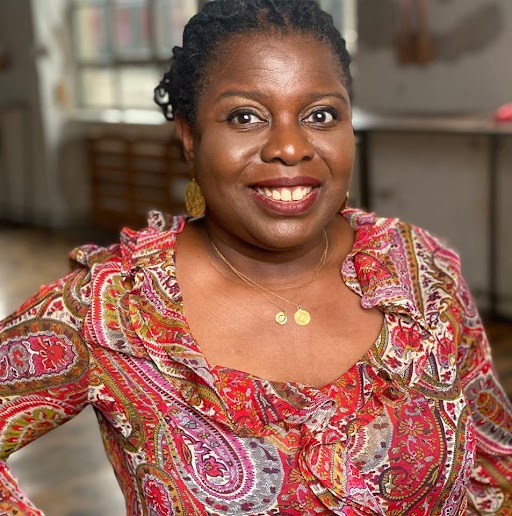
Dr. Brunache @ University of Glasgow

Peggy Brunache is a Haitian American food historian and archaeologist. She currently lives in Perth and lectures at the University of Glasgow on the History of Atlantic slavery and is the Director of the Beniba Centre for Slavery Studies. Brunache has contributed to various BBC programs and is involved with an annual food festival in Perth called the Southern Fried Food Festival.

== Biography ==
Brunache is Haitian American in heritage and grew up in Miami, Florida. In college, she pursued anthropology and then became involved with a field school run by Kathleen Deagan at St. Augustine, Florida. Brunache earned her master's degree at the University of South Carolina and then earned her doctorate at the University of Texas. While in South Carolina, Brunache missed the food she had grown up with and began to cook for herself.

In May 2006, she moved to Scotland to be closer to Andy Shearer. Brunache and Shearer met in 2005 at South by Southwest, and after meeting, they stayed in touch. They were married in December 2006. Together they started a family and she finished up her thesis which focused on women in slavery in Guadeloupe and their cuisine. Her work for her thesis pointed to the origins of modern Creole cuisine and Soul Food. Through her work on women in La Mahaudière, she discovered that slave women did most of the cooking and were very involved in the island markets. These women significantly contributed to the cuisine of the region.

Around 2007, Shearer and Brunache started the Perth Southern Fried Food Festival. The festival celebrates American food from the Southern United States. She also has contributed to BBC Radio Scotland's The Kitchen Café. She has also been featured in the BBC Two history series, A Black History of Britain.

Brunache lectures at the University of Glasgow. In 2016, she was awarded a Ford Foundation fellowship to do an excavation of the first integrated school in Ohio, the Parker Academy.
