= Charles Moravia =

Haitian poet

Charles Moravia (17 June 1875 – 11 February 1938) was a Haitian poet, dramatist, teacher, and diplomat.

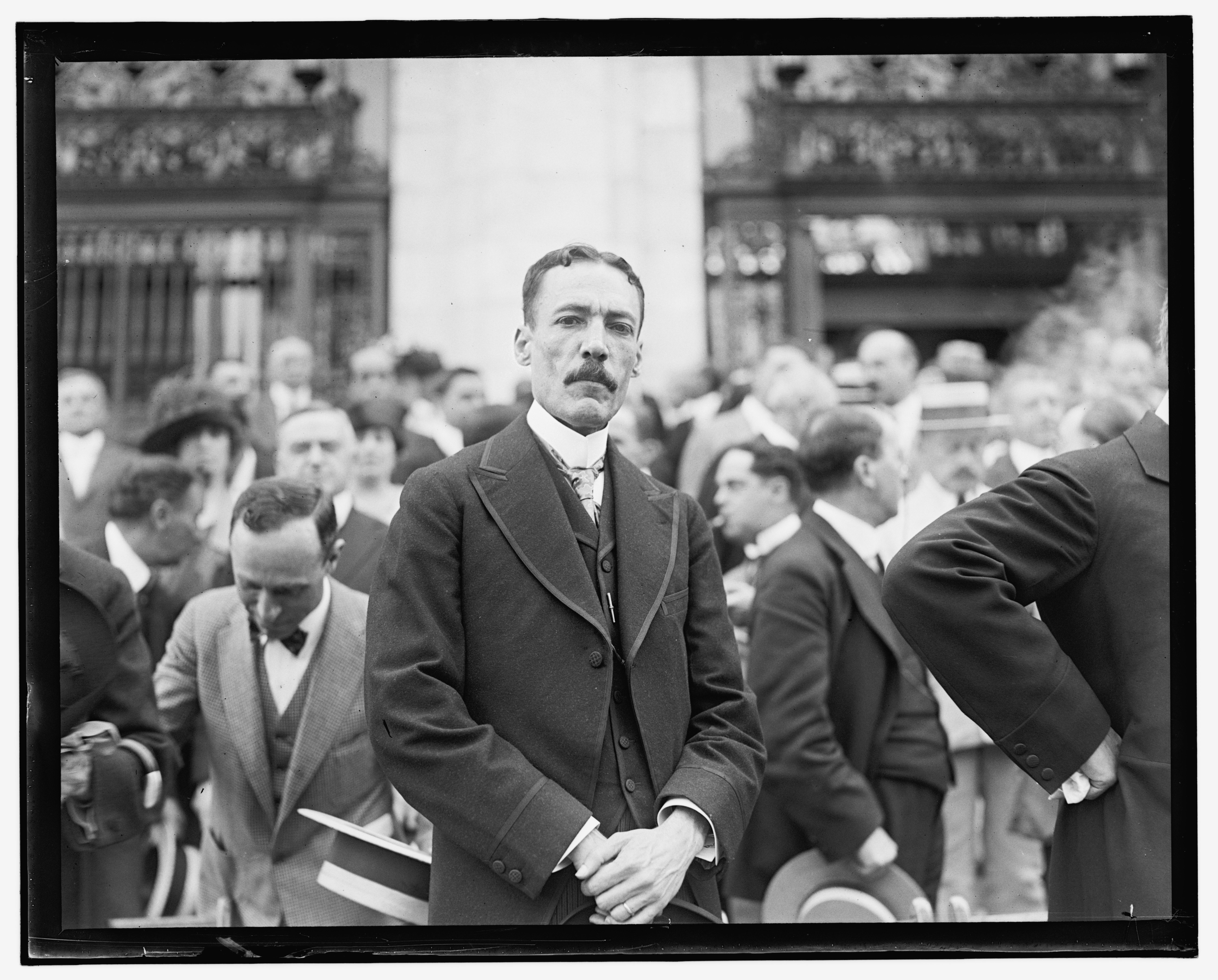

== Biography ==
Born in Jacmel, Moravia studied at the Petit Séminaire Collège Saint-Martial in Port-au-Prince. He became a teacher in Jacmel and founded two periodicals, the short-lived La Plume, published from 1914 to 1915, and Le Temps, started in 1922 as a daily paper and later a magazine. He was an elected officer of the Haitian Academy of Arts and Sciences. An admirer of Heinrich Heine, Moravia translated the verse of the German poet, working from the prose translation of Gérard de Nerval. Moravia was also influenced by Edmond Rostand's play Cyrano de Bergerac.

He also had a career in public service and was appointed Minister Plenipotentiary to Washington, D.C., in 1919, during the United States' occupation of Haiti. He also served as a Senator of the Republic during the presidency of Sténio Vincent.

Moravia was jailed by the Vincent government for his articles written in opposition to the American occupation.

== Selected works ==
- Roses et Camélias (Port-au-Prince: Impr. Mme F. Smith, 1903) - poetry
- Ode à la mémoire de Toussaint Louverture (Port-au-Prince: Impr. Mme F. Smith, 1903) - poetry
- La Crête à Pierrot (1908) - drama
- Au Clair de la Lune (1910) - drama
- L'Amiral Killick (1943) - drama
- Sonnet sur Deux Clous - poetry
