= Toby Anbakè =

- Also known as: Toby
- Born: Owen Martinez Fava; November 3, 1990 (age 34); Port-au-Prince, Haiti
- Origin: Haiti
- Genres: Hip-hop
- Occupation(s): Musician, rapper, composer, and singer

Owen Martinez Fava (born November 3, 1990), known professionally as Toby Anbakè, is a Haitian rapper and singer.

== Biography ==
=== Early life and education ===
Owen Martinez Fava was born on November 3, 1990, in Port-au-Prince at the Asile Français hospital. His mother Elizabeth Louis and his father Jean-Sylvestre Fava are both Christians born in Haiti. Toby sang in an evangelical church and in the children's choir at Bethany Adventist Church in Cap-Haïtien. His music was instilled in him by his aunt, a choir singer. His grandfather, Toby, was a troubadour guitarist. His rap closely reflects his grandfather's musical journey. Early on, at Le Phare Middle School, he discovered his talent as a poet. He then established himself as a street lyric poet, juggling verses that he sang day and night on the cobblestones of Cité Chauvel in Cap-Haïtien.

=== Career ===
Toby Anbakè made his public singing debut at the age of fourteen, while in his ninth year at Collège Pratique du Nord. This marked the beginning of his musical career.

== Discography ==
=== Studio albums ===
- Vibe sou Vibe (2022)
- Nothing To Lose – Still Nothing To Lose (2025)

=== Singles ===
- Sa Blan Di (2016)
- Sa Plis Ke Love (2017)
- Dralp (De Retour Apres La Pause) (2020)
- Anemi (2020)
- Strong Girl (2020)
- My Everything (2021)
- Panne Gaz (2021)
- M Anvi Wel (2021)
- In Love (2021)
- Ou Dwe Kwem (2022)
- M' Tris (2022)
- Happy Birthday (2022)
- Je L'aime a Mourir (2023)
- Map Fou Pou Li (2023)
- M Antrave (2022)
- Sans Regret (2023)
- Stand By (2024)
