= Misty Jean =

Haitian singer

- Born: 1980 (age 45–46); Port-au-Prince, Haiti
- Genres: Reggae fusion; R&B; soul; neo soul; compas
- Occupations: Singer-songwriter; record executive; entrepreneur
- Instrument: Vocals
- Years active: 2004–present

Misty Jean (born c. 1980 in Haiti) is a former Miss West Indies and singer. She sings in her native Haitian Creole / French language and also in English.

== Early life ==
Misty Jean started performing at age of three with the dance institute of Lynn W. Rouzier. She started singing at the age of seven in amateur singing contests. She attended Anglade College where she was named soloist of the choir.

== Performance career ==
In 1998, she took part in La Soiree Magique De La Guitare with pianist Raoul Denis Jr. and the Widmaier brothers. In 1999, she was selected by Haitel, the leading Haitian cellular phone company, to be their spokesmodel in a major promotional campaign.

On 4th July 2004, she performed live at the Bayfront Park alongside Lil' Kim. In August 2004, she embarked on a tour of the French Antilles and in December 2005, she performed at the Bataclan Theatre, Paris. She performed at Bicentennial Park for the Greater Miami Mardi Gras, in Florida in February 2006. In January 2007, she hosted the Haitian Independence Festival at Bayfront Park.

In 2009, she performed with her band on the float of Unitransfer at the Jacmel Carnival, Haiti. During the same period, she performed at the Concert Chocolat at the prestigious Parc Historique de la Canne, Port-au-Prince.

In 2010 Misty Jean appeared at the 10th annual Kreyolfest: A Benefit for Haiti, in Brooklyn, New York. In 2012 she took part in the Jacmel Carnival in Haiti.

=== Albums ===
Year	Album	Notes
2004	Plus Pres De Toi	In French / Creole
2006	Konpa A Gogo	
2006	Ale	Live
2008	Li Pa Two Ta	Featuring Puerto Rican rapper Shino
2009		Live album
2011	Just Like That	
2012	Misty Jean: Live Experience Vol. 1	Live album
2015	Best of Misty Jean	
2022	Ret Avem	Single

=== Film and video ===
She has released five videos: "Kijan La Ri A Ye", "Tam Tam featuring Shino", "Paradi Lanmou", "Maladie D'Amour", and "Ce Ou Mwen Vle".

In 2009, she made her acting debut in the movie The Price to Pay by Mora Etienne Jr. in which she played the lead role of Zoulmie.

=== Contests ===
In 2001, she represented Haiti among twenty two other countries for the title of Miss West Indies in Saint Maarten. She won the contest for best talent and was also crowned Miss West Indies. In 2002, she was crowned Miss de la Francophonie in Port-au-Prince and in 2003, she was crowned Queen of Carnival at the Greater Miami Mardi Gras.

== Awards ==
Year	Nominee / work	Award	Result
2004	Female Singer of The Year	Ticket D’Or, Ticket Magazine	Won
2006	Female Singer of The Year	Ticket D’Or, Ticket Magazine	Won
2008	Best Female Artist	Opamizik	Won
