= Jules Solime Milscent =

Haitian politician and poet

Jules Solime Milscent (c. 1778 – 7 May 1842) was a Haitian fabulist, poet, and politician. He was a mulatto, born in Grande-Rivière du Nord to an ethnically French father and a free mother of African descent. Educated in France, Milscent co-founded the periodical L'Abeille Haytienne and served in several government positions, including a seat on the commission to draft the Haitian Civil Code. He is best known for his fables, such as:

L'Homme, la Guêpe et le Serpent
Le Cœur et l'Esprit
L'Homme et le Serpent
Le Chien et le Loup
L'Enfant et la Sauterelle

Milscent was killed in the 1842 Cap-Haïtien earthquake.
