= John Steve Brunache =

Haitian musician

John Steve Brunache is a famous Haitian musician who came to prominence during the 80's and 90's. He is an influential figure who spoke on the issues of the times with such songs as "La Relev", "Chimen Limye", and "timoun yo".

== Career ==
John Steve released his seminal album, Chimen Limyè, in 1994 from New York City, where he moved from Haiti in self-exile due to the risks to him and his family caused by the political nature of his music.

"You cannot build good on the outside if you don't have it on the inside," Brunache, the mystic poet-singer, whose love affair with Haiti has nearly made him an icon in the Haitian folk music genre.

His philosophical outlook on life is also embedded in his lifestyle. That lifestyle resonates in his lyrics and his melodies. Religion is the first tier of the foundation of Brunache's prose. Brunache says: "I always meditate through yoga before writing." A devout vegetarian, he openly admits to his fascination with religion: Zen Buddhism, Taoism, Islam, Voodoo as well as various branches of Christianity. It was these teachings that fed his knowledge of self-enlightenment. "Knowing myself enables me to better understand others," he explains. Brunache so believed in his theory, that in the early 1980s he became a theology student.

The need for artistic expression did not lag far behind. As a child Brunache had a natural inclination for the arts. In the mid-1980s, he enrolled in one of Haiti's most prestigious arts institutions, the National School for the Arts. In Dramatic arts, Brunache became a composer, producer and a self-taught guitarist.

Poetry is an integral part of his music, Brunache does not sacrifice melodies in his message to the world. Like many Haitians, Brunache a native of Grand-Anse, Haiti's southwest region renowned for its strong political foresight and rebellion, is firmly grounded in his political ideals. Politics first put him in the spotlight of Haiti's social-political and cultural movement, long before big U.S. record companies saw fit to invest in cross over racine/roots bands like Boukman Eksperyans. Some would argue that his devotion to preserve this African-based musical tradition came even before notable roots bands like Boukan Ginen, Koudjay, Ram, and Kampech decided to embrace and capitalize on it.

Playing an active role in the Musical Freedom Movement, Brunache and his then newly founded five piece Band Tonm-Tonm (the name of a popular peasant delicacy of Jeremie) "sang for all of Haiti," says Brunache, but wanted to help transform the country to benefit the masses, more specifically, the poor. For this, his popularity rose substantially. So much so that his roots band specializing in a style of music known as "pile", (a double entendre meaning to "step on" as well as "to grind") performed at the Sylvio Cator Stadium, one of Haiti's largest venues. They also performed for President Jean-Bertrand Aristide, Haiti's first democratically elected president, on the eve of his inauguration.

During the tail-end of the Duvalier regime, one of Tonm Tonm's group members was sentenced and spent two months in Fort Dimanche, a prison notoriously known as Fort La Mort, or "Fort of Death". After his release, he later died. Despite this tragedy, Tonm-Tonm began putting together their first album. But once again political hardship changed their fate. The 1991 coup that ousted Aristide led to turbulent times, even for artists. As fear and violence spread across Haiti, many fled to save their lives. Shortly after, another of the group's members was killed, leaving Brunache and one other member as the sole survivors.
