= Etzer Vilaire =

Haitian poet and attorney

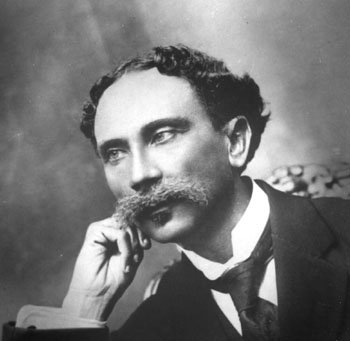
Etzer Vilaire

Etzer Vilaire (7 April 1872 - 1951) was a Haitian poet and attorney.

== Early life and education ==
Born in Jérémie, Vilaire was educated in private schools. He attended law school and passed the bar.

== Career ==
Entering a law practice, he wrote poetry in his spare time but it was his true vocation.

He was a member of the literary society La Ronde.

== Literary career ==
He published several books of poetry. His most remembered works are Page d'Amour (1897), Dix Hommes Noirs (1901), Années Tendres (1907), and Nouveaux Poèmes (1910).
