= List of Haitian journalists =

This is a list of Haitian journalists.

== D ==
- Vanessa Dalzon – Balistrad
- Frantz Duval – Le Nouvelliste

== E ==
- Elsie Etheart — Haïti en Marche

== J ==
- Ady Jean-Gardy – Haitian Press Federation

== M ==
- Michèle Montas – UN Radio

== P ==
- Fincy Pierre – Balistrad
- Liliane Pierre-Paul – Radio Kiskeya
- Emmelie Prophète – Le Nouvelliste

== V ==
- Gary Victor – Le Matin
