= Damage to infrastructure in the 2010 Haiti earthquake =

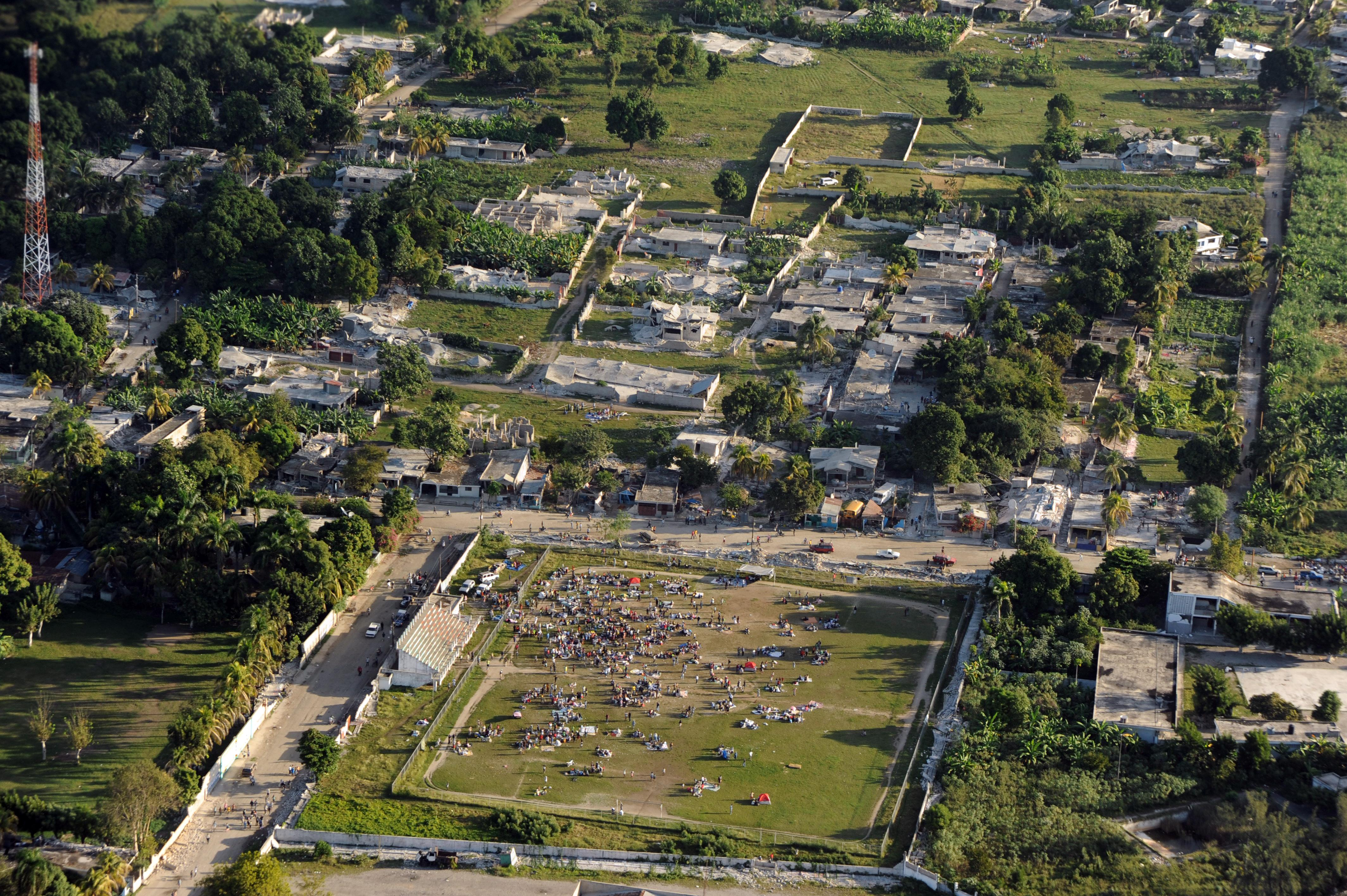
Collapsed buildings in Port-au-Prince

Damage to infrastructure in the 2010 Haiti earthquake was extensive and affected areas included Port-au-Prince, Petit-Goâve, Léogâne, Jacmel and other settlements in southwestern Haiti. In February Prime Minister Jean-Max Bellerive estimated that 250,000 residences and 30,000 commercial buildings had collapsed or were severely damaged. The deputy mayor of Léogâne, which was at the epicenter of the earthquake, reported that 90% percent of the buildings in that city had been destroyed and Léogâne had "to be totally rebuilt." Many notable landmark buildings were significantly damaged or destroyed, including the Presidential Palace, the National Assembly building, the Port-au-Prince Cathedral, and the main jail. The Ministry of Education estimated that half the nation's 15,000 primary schools and 1,500 secondary schools were severely damaged, cracked or destroyed. In addition, the three main universities in Port-au-Prince were also severely damaged. Other affected infrastructure included telephone networks, radio station, factories, and museums. Poor infrastructure before the earthquake only made the aftermath worse. It would take half a day to make a trip of a few miles. The roads would also crisscross haphazardly due to disorganized construction.

== Essential services ==
Amongst the widespread devastation and damage throughout Port-au-Prince and elsewhere, vital infrastructure necessary to respond to the disaster was severely damaged or destroyed. This included all hospitals in the northwest; air, sea, and land transport facilities; and communication systems. Due to this infrastructure damage and loss of organizational structures, a spokeswoman from the UN Office for the Coordination of Humanitarian Affairs called it as one of the worst disaster the United Nations (UN) had ever confronted.

The quake affected the three Médecins Sans Frontières (Doctors Without Borders) medical facilities around Port-au-Prince, causing one to collapse completely. A hospital in Pétion-Ville, a wealthy suburb of Port-au-Prince, also collapsed, as did the St. Michel District Hospital in the southern town of Jacmel, which was the largest referral hospital in south-east Haiti.

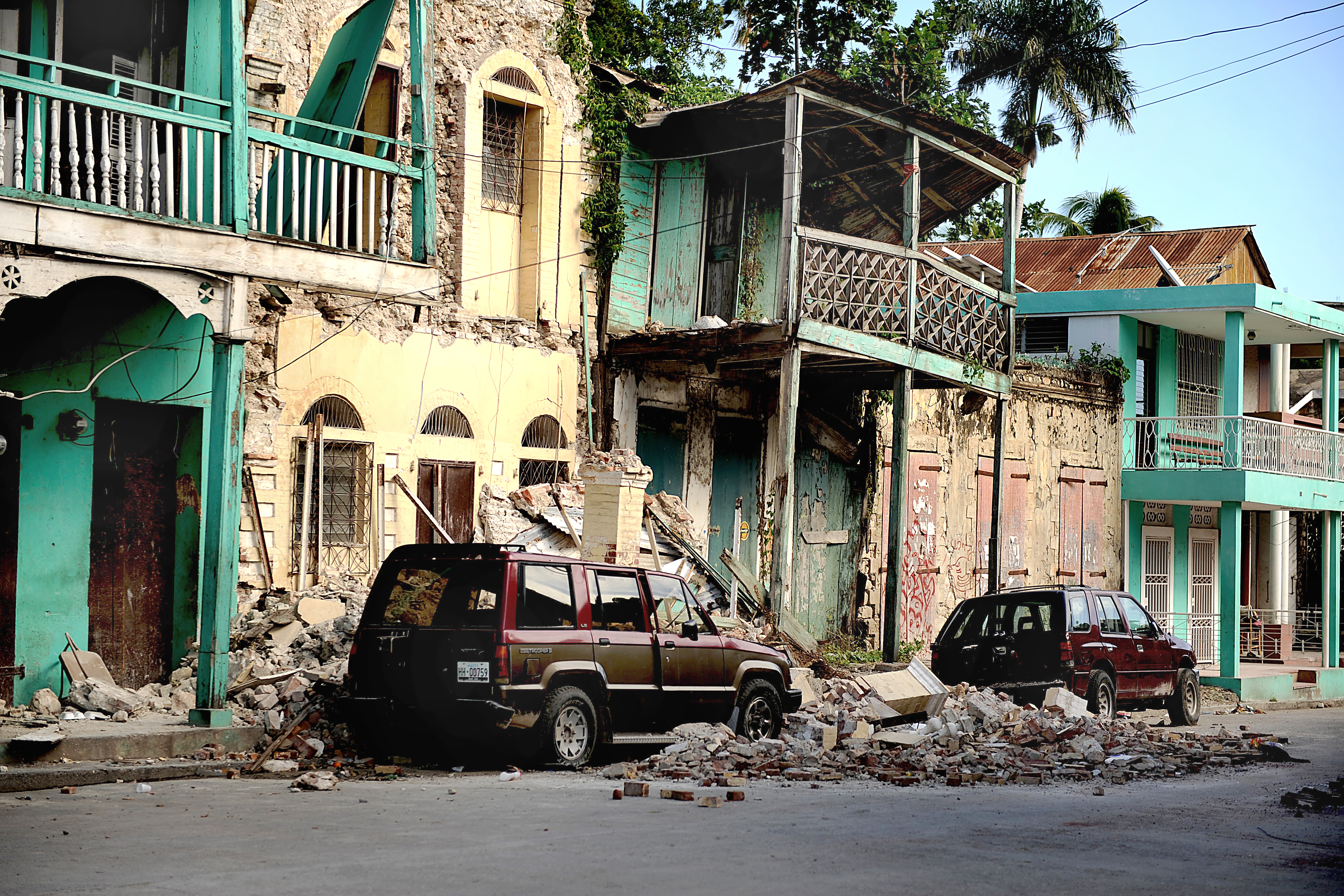
Damaged buildings in Jacmel

The quake seriously damaged the control tower at Toussaint L'Ouverture International Airport and the Port-au-Prince seaport. Reported damage to the seaport included the collapse of cranes and containers into the water, structural damage to the pier, waterfront quay areas collapsing into the water with crevassing and slumping of level waterfront ship-unloading dock-work areas, container cranes leaning because of ground subsidence, and an oil spill, rendering the harbor unusable for immediate rescue operations. The Gonaïves seaport, in the northern part of Haiti, remained operational.

The main road linking Port-au-Prince with Jacmel remained blocked ten days after the earthquake, hampering delivery of aid to Jacmel. When asked why the road had not been opened, Hazem el-Zein, head of the south-east division of the UN World Food Programme said that "We ask the same questions to the people in charge...They promise rapid response. To be honest, I don't know why it hasn't been done. I can only think that their priority must be somewhere else."

There was considerable damage to communications infrastructure. The public telephone system was not available, and Haiti's largest cellular telephone provider, Digicel, suffered damage to its network. It was operational by 14 January, but the volume of calls overwhelmed its capacity and most calls could not be connected. Comcel Haiti's facilities were not severely damaged, but its mobile phone service was temporarily shut down on 12 January. By 14 January the company had re-established 70% of its services. Service on the spur connection to the BDSNi cable system which provided Haiti with its only direct fibre-optic connectivity to the outside world, was disrupted, with the terminal in Port-au-Prince being completely destroyed.

According to Reporters Sans Frontières (RSF), most of the radio stations in the earthquake struck region went off the air after the earthquake and only 20 out of 50 stations in Port-au-Prince were back on air a week after the earthquake. The stations that were completely destroyed include Radio TV Ginen, Radio Soleil, Radio Ibo and Tropic FM. RSF also reported that 12 radio stations in the southwestern town of Petit-Goâve and five of Léogâne's nine stations were badly damaged. The Committee to Protect Journalists reported that several other stations, including Melodie FM, Radio Caraïbes, Signal FM, and Radio Métropole, continued to operate. The UN mission's station, Radio Minustah, was disabled by the quake, but returned to the air on 18 January. The Agence France-Presse office was in ruins, but within days of the earthquake the agency resumed operations from new premises. The offices of the capital's two leading newspapers, Le Nouvelliste and Le Matin, were not severely damaged, but for more than a week after the earthquake they were unable to print.

== General infrastructure ==
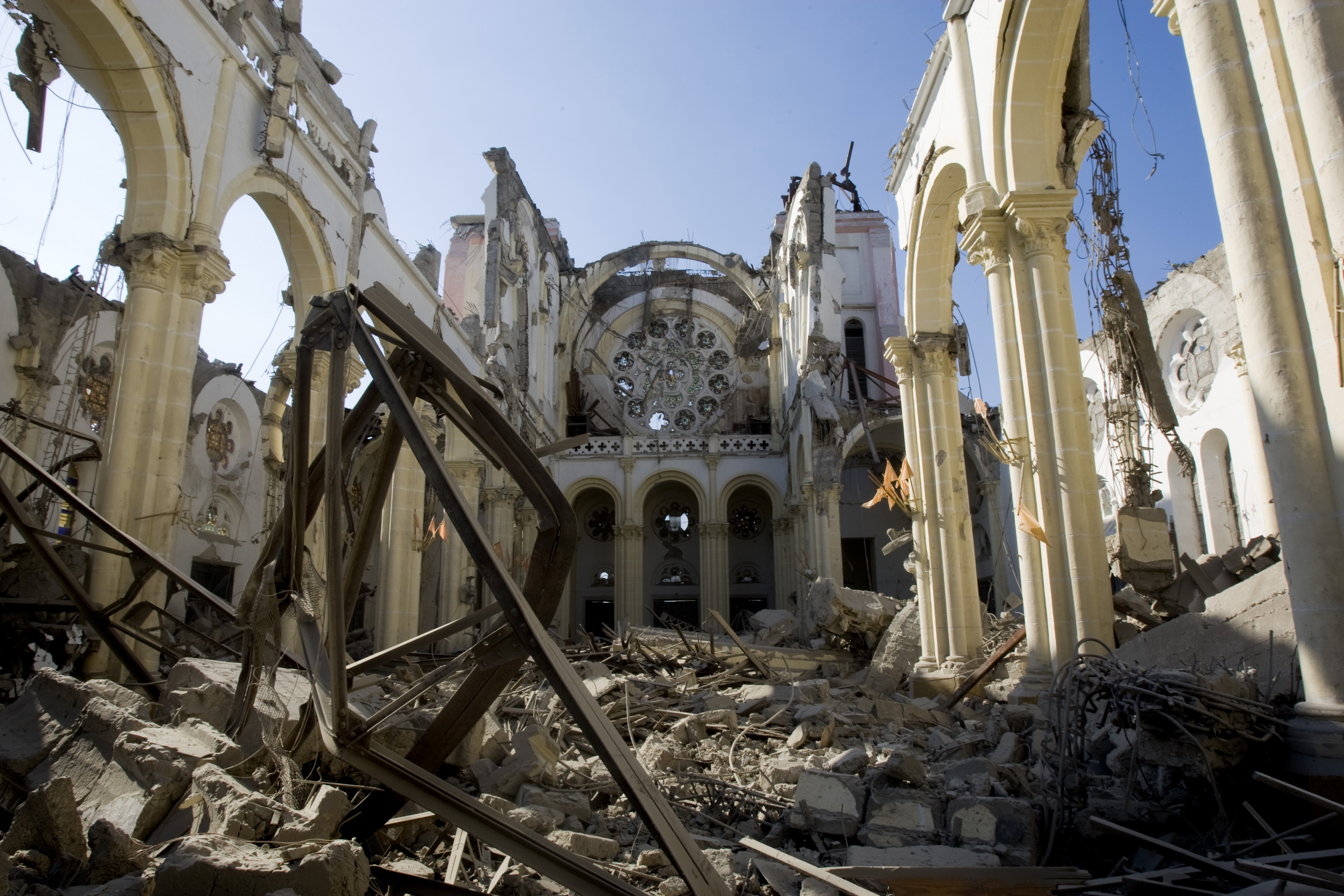
The damage suffered by Port-au-Prince Cathedral

The buildings of the finance ministry, the ministry of education, the ministry of public works, the ministry of communication and culture, the Palais de Justice (Supreme Court building), the Superior Normal School, the National School of Administration, the Institut Aimé Césaire, the Palais Législatif (National Assembly building) and Port-au-Prince Cathedral were damaged to varying degrees. The National Palace (Presidential mansion) was severely damaged, though President René Préval and his wife Elisabeth Delatour Préval, who were about to enter their house when it "just fell", escaped injury. The Prison Civile de Port-au-Prince was also destroyed, allowing 4,000 inmates to escape into the streets. As of 19 January only 12 had been rearrested. Some of the escaped convicts were reported to have stolen official uniforms, vehicles, and weapons, after starting fires and killing four guards during the breakout.

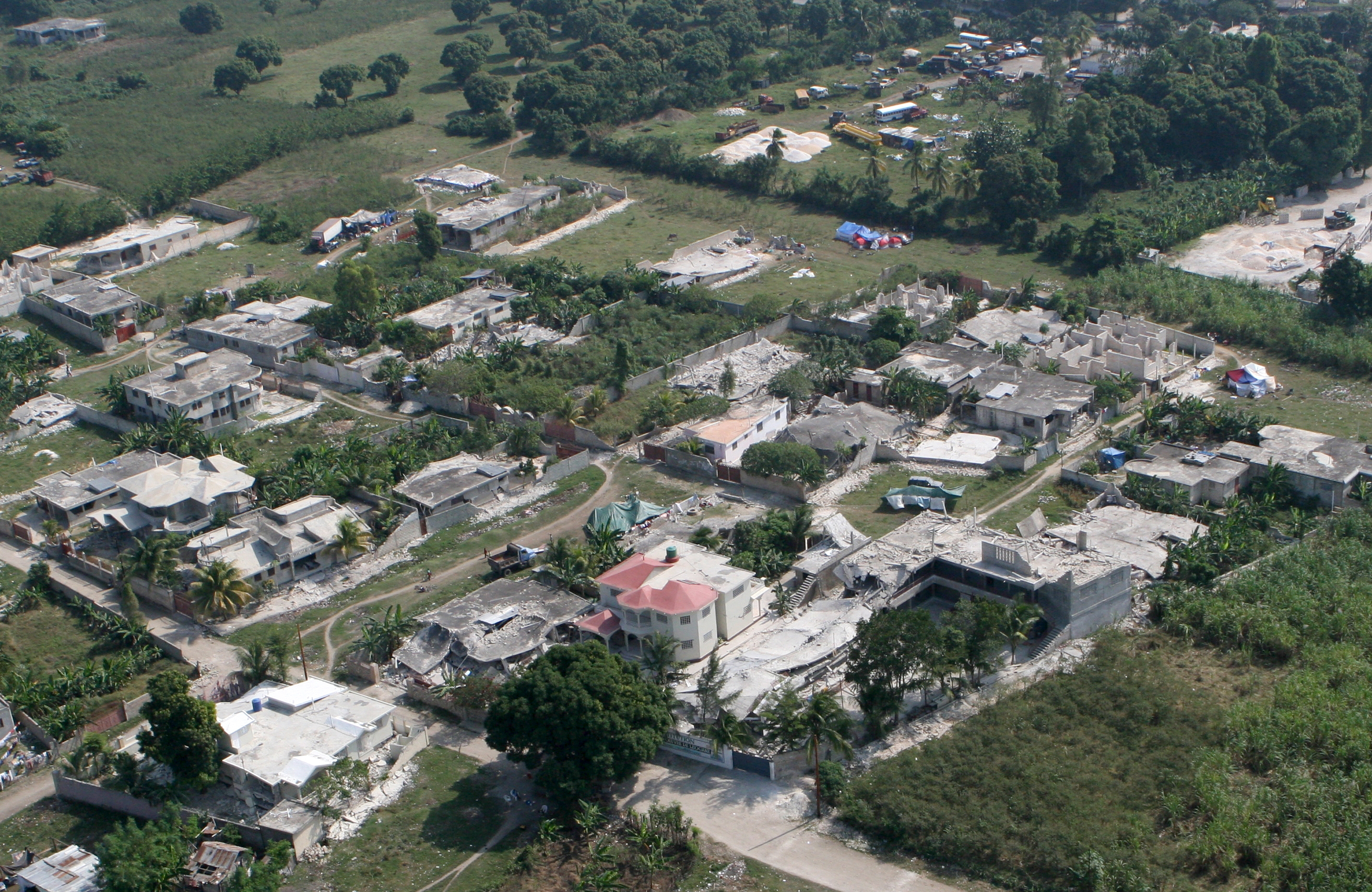
Léogâne, close to the earthquake epicentre

The headquarters of the United Nations Stabilization Mission in Haiti (MINUSTAH) at Christopher Hotel and offices of the World Bank were destroyed. The building housing the offices of Citibank in Port-au-Prince collapsed, killing five employees. Up to 200 guests at the collapsed Hôtel Montana in Port-au-Prince are presumed dead. Despite the official search being called off, as of 24 January teams were continuing to look for survivors at the Montana.

Most of Port-au-Prince's municipal government buildings were destroyed or heavily damaged in the earthquake, including the City Hall, which was described by The Washington Post as, "a skeletal hulk of concrete and stucco, sagging grotesquely to the left." City officials including Mayor Jean Yves Jason were left without facilities in which to conduct official business or coordinate recovery efforts. Port-au-Prince had no municipal petrol reserves and few city officials had working mobile phones before the earthquake, complicating communications and transportation.

Minister of Education Joel Jean-Pierre stated that the education system had "totally collapsed". About half the nation's 15,000 primary schools and 1,500 secondary schools were affected by the earthquake and the three main universities in Port-au-Prince were also "almost totally destroyed." The earthquake also destroyed a nursing school in the capital, one of three such schools in the country, and severely damaged the country's primary midwifery school that provided essential training necessary to reduce Haiti's maternal mortality rate, which is one of the highest in the world. Various Catholic religious institutes reported the destruction and damage of churches, schools and offices.

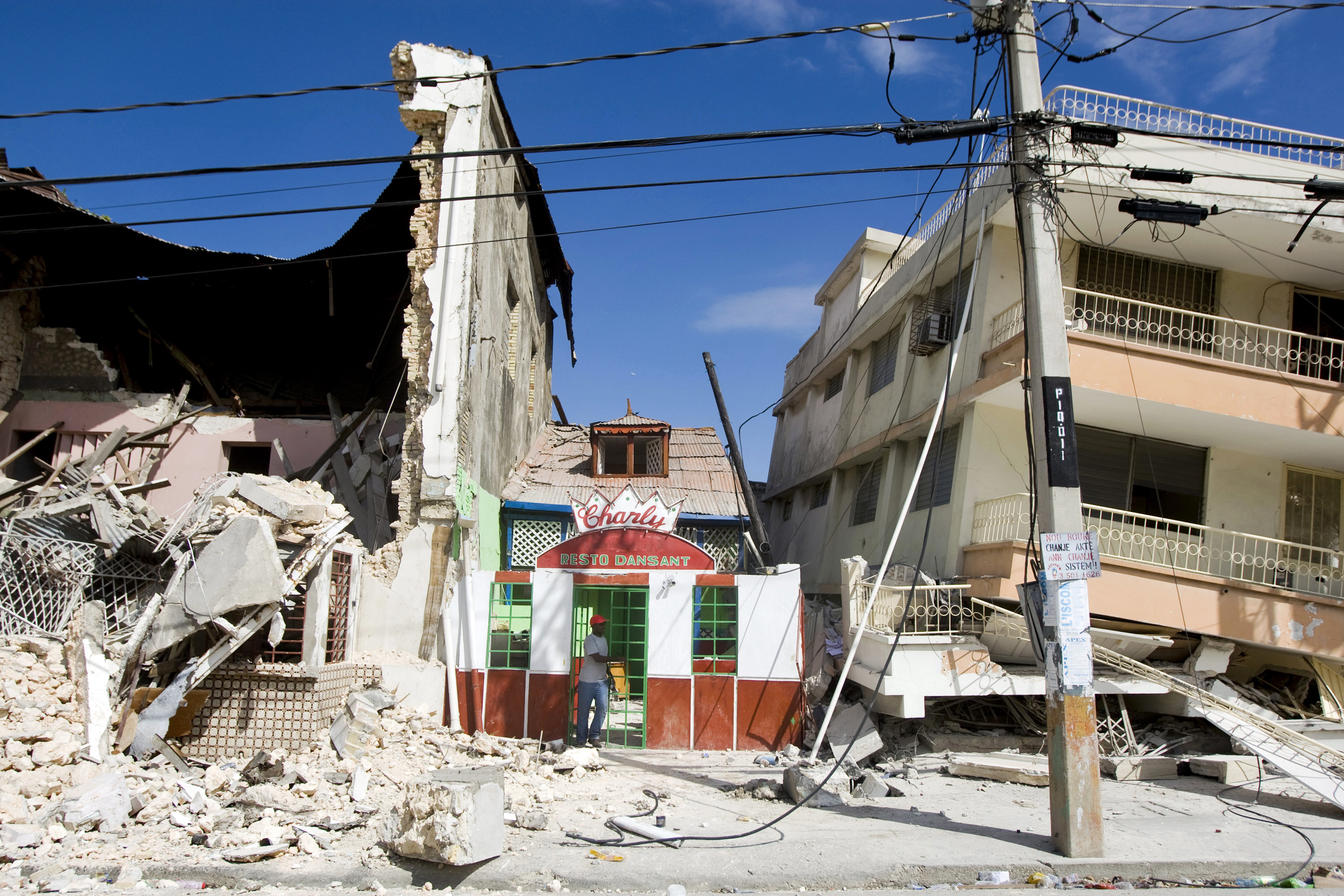
A man in Port-au-Prince exits a restaurant after he looked for his belongings.

The clothing industry, which accounts for two-thirds of Haiti's exports, reported structural damage at manufacturing facilities in Haiti. U.S.-based Hanesbrands Inc. reported that three of its four factories had been affected by the quake, with one facility substantially damaged. The Canadian clothing company Gildan Activewear reported that one of the three textile factories that produce its products had been severely damaged. The Palm Apparel factory complex in Port-au-Prince reported that 500 of its 1800 employees were killed when one of its buildings collapsed.

The Haitian art world also suffered great losses. Museums and art galleries were extensively damaged, among them Port-au-Prince's main art museum, Centre d'Art, where many art works were destroyed. The collection at College Saint Pierre also was devastated, as was the collection of priceless murals in the Holy Trinity Cathedral. Some private art galleries were also severely damaged, including the Monnin Gallery in Pétion-Ville, and the Nader Art Gallery and Musée Nader in Port-au-Prince. Composed of the personal collection of Georges Nader Sr., the Nader collection was worth an estimated US$30-US$100 million. Shortly after the earthquake struck, UNESCO assigned special envoy Bernard Hadjadj to evaluate damage to artwork.

Buildings shook in Santo Domingo, the capital of the neighboring Dominican Republic, but no major damage was reported there.

== Toussaint Louverture International Airport ==
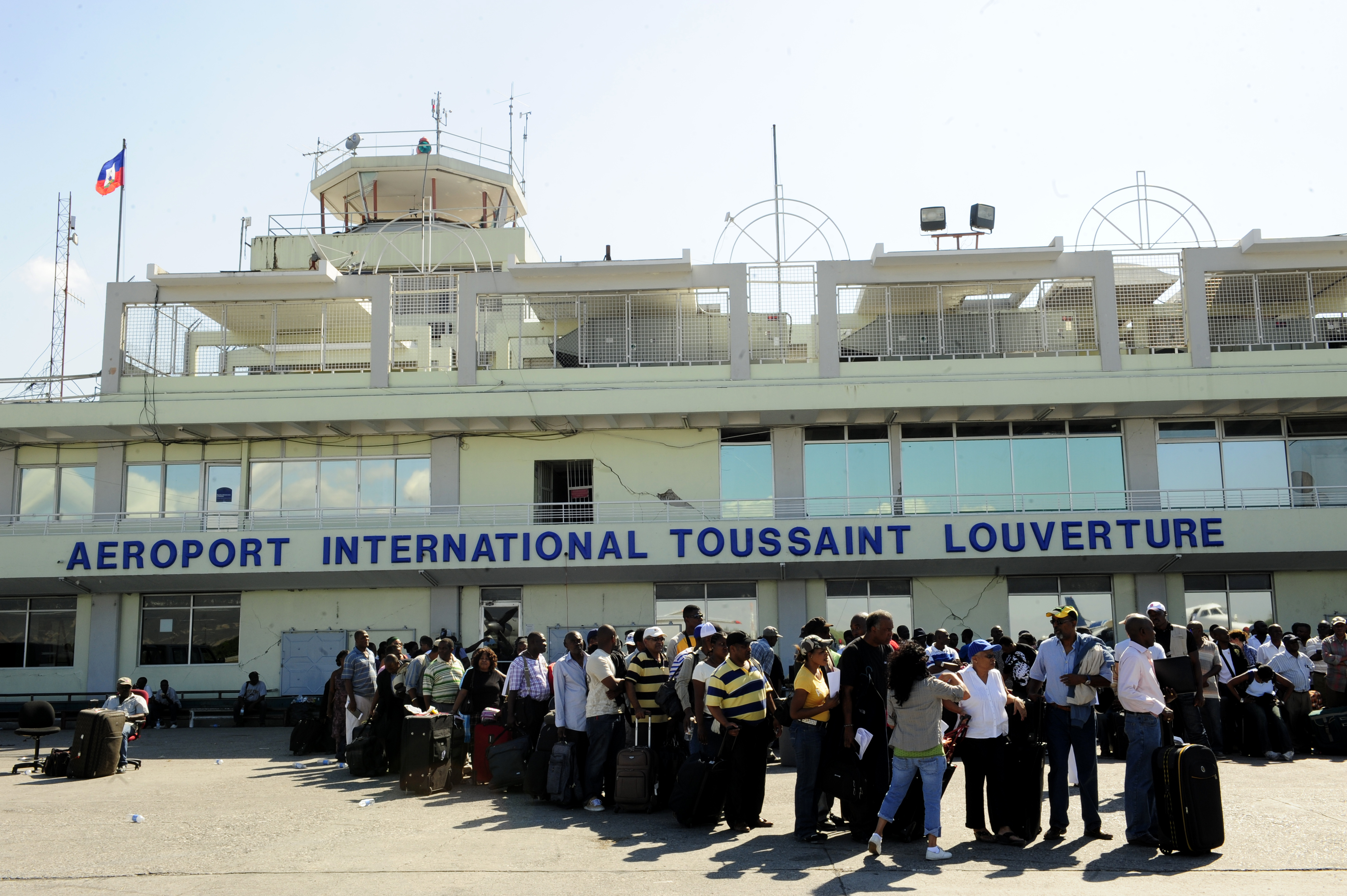
People awaiting evacuation at the airport, January 15.

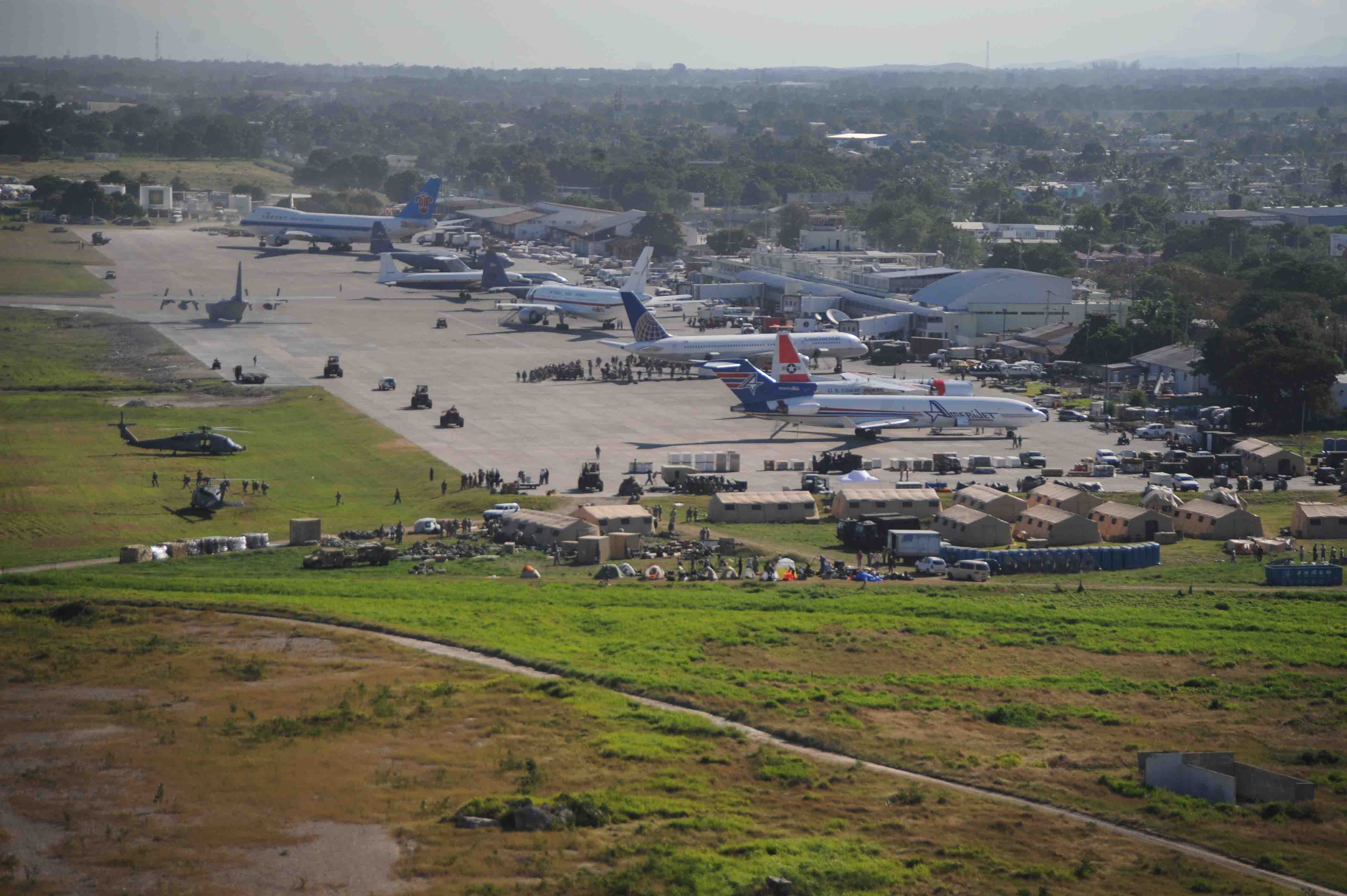
Relief operations crowd the airport, January 18.

As the hypocenter or focus of the 2010 Haiti earthquake on January 12 was shallow (6 miles) and very near, Toussaint Louverture International Airport was damaged. The runway, the taxiways and the apron of the airport remained operational, but radio communications were not possible because the control tower was extensively damaged. The airport lighting system was also shut down due to power outages. Nevertheless, the airport could be accessed with UNICOM procedures after the quake.

On the morning of January 13, the U.S. Coast Guard cutter Forward arrived and began running air-traffic control from Port-au-Prince Bay. UN Peacekeeping forces had also moved quickly to secure the airport, thus allowing international rescue and aid forces to start their work. Later in the day, United States Air Force Special Tactics personnel landed at the airport and assumed air traffic control (ATC) duties and much of the operation of the airport. Their ATC set-up consisted of a folding table near the runway and handheld transceivers, and a motorcycle to guide aircraft to parking zones.

As of January 14, dozens of cargo planes were landing and taking off, but regular scheduled commercial air service ceased. Meantime, some inbound travelers were reaching Haiti by flying to neighboring Dominican Republic, primarily Las Américas International Airport in Santo Domingo, and then traveling overland.

On January 15, heavy traffic to the airport forced the Federal Aviation Administration's Air Traffic Control System Command Center to issue a ground stop for all aircraft trying to leave the U.S. for Haitian airspace due to limited space and lack of fuel at Haiti airport. Problems had been compounded by pilots inbound to the airport canceling instrument flight rules operation and proceeding on visual flight rules. That day the United States was formally granted temporary control of the airport per a memorandum of understanding signed by the Haitian Prime Minister. The airport has apparently been operating without radar, although the aircraft carrier USS Carl Vinson arrived the morning of the 15th and has advanced aircraft tracking capabilities.

By the morning of January 18, less than five days after arriving, a reported 819 aircraft had landed under the direction of the USAF team. That day, 180 flights were handled at the airport according to Lieutenant General Ken Keen, commander of the U.S. joint task force assisting in Haiti.

Late in January, US military had plans established to reopen the airport to civilian flights. Some military flights would be shifted to Jacmel Airport, under control of the Canadian Forces.

On February 19, 2010, partial commercial operation returned to the airport.

== See also ==
- List of populated places affected by the 2010 Haiti earthquake
