= Josaphat-Robert Large =

Euro-Haitian-American poet, novelist and art critic

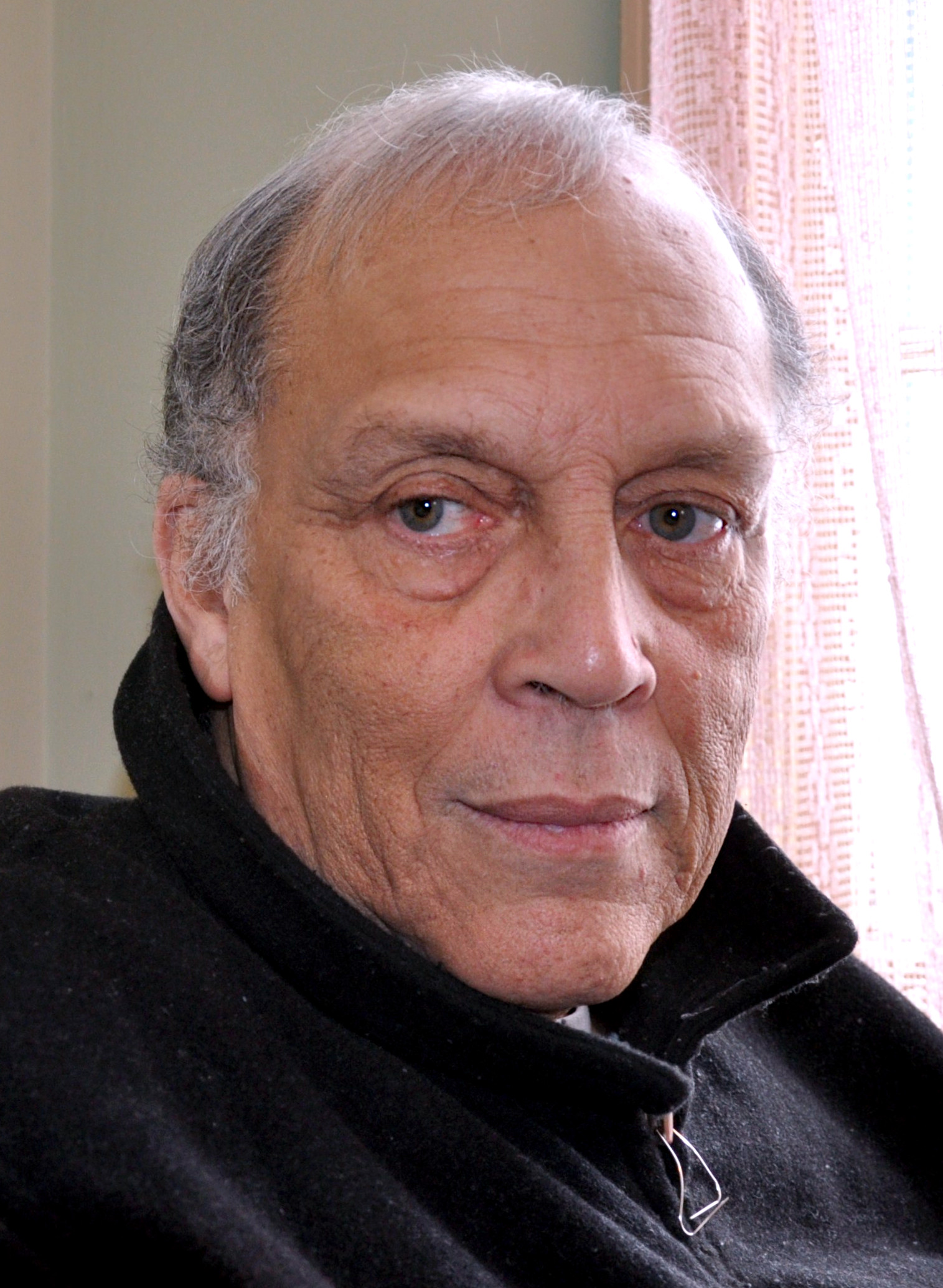
- Born: November 15, 1942; Jérémie, Haiti
- Died: October 28, 2017 (aged 74); New York City, New York, U.S.
- Occupations: Poet, novelist, art critic
- Writing career
- Notable work: Les terres entourées de larmes
- Notable awards: Prix littéraire des Caraïbes (Caribbean literary Prize) in 2003, nominated for the Haitian grand Literary Prize of 2004

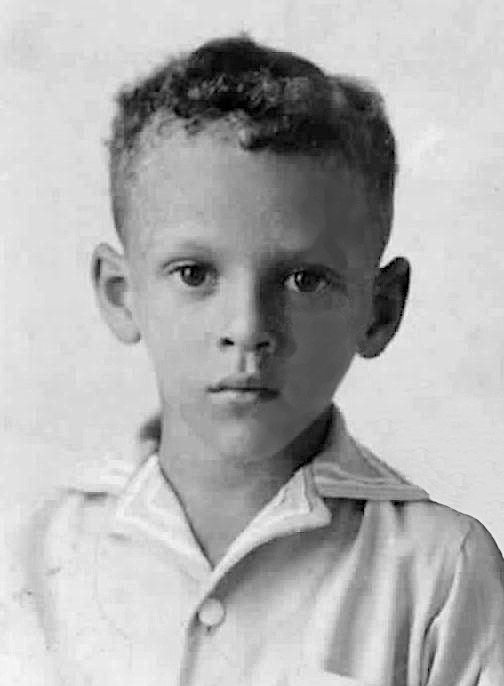
Large, 8 years old

Josaphat-Robert Large (November 15, 1942 – October 28, 2017) was a Euro-Haitian-American poet, novelist and art critic. His novel Les terres entourées de larmes [Shore surrounded with tears] won the prestigious Prix littéraire des Caraïbes (Caribbean literary Prize) in 2003. He was nominated for the Haitian grand Literary Prize of 2004, together with Edwidge Danticat, René Depestre, Frankétienne, Gary Klang, Dany Laferrière and Leslie Manigat (ex-president of Haiti, the winner of the Prize).

Large was also one of the finalists at the Ushant (Ouessant in French) Literary Contest in 2002. He wrote in both French and Haitian Creole. Josaphat-Robert Large was a member of " La Société des Gens de Lettres de France" (Society of French intellectuals), of the "Association des Écrivains de langue française" (Association of writers of French origin) and of the PEN Club America. The Society of French and francophone teachers of America has organized two colloquium on his literary production (specially his novels), one at Florida International University in 2001 and one at Fordham University in 2006. Large also participated in the famous festival Étonnants-Voyageurs in 2007 and in 2008, he was one of the author in the great literary opening organized in Port-au-Prince by the Presses Nationales d'Haiti (National Press of Haiti).

== Exile ==
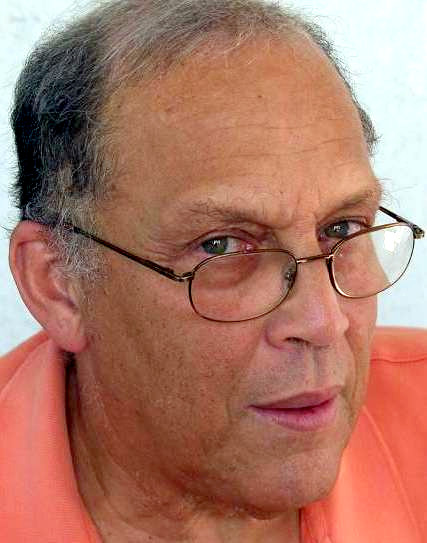
Josaphat-Robert Large (September 2007)

Josaphat-Robert Large left Haiti at the end of 1963, after being arrested during a student strike against the regime of Papa Doc Duvalier. In New York, he studied English at Columbia University and photography at New York institute of Photography. He was a founding member of La Troupe de Théâtre Kouidor (Theatre group Kouidor) and frequently wrote for Haitian newspapers such as Haïti Progrès, Haïti en Marche, Le Nouvelliste and Lire Haiti.

== Death ==
Large died of cancer in 2017.

== Selected works ==
- Nerfs du vent – Compilation of Poems, Paris, 1975. Rev. ed. Publisher: Ruptures, Washington DC, 2013
- Chute de mots – Compilation of Poems, Paris, 1989
- Les sentiers de l'enfer – Novel, Paris, 1990
- Pè Sèt ! – Compilation of Poems Written in Creole, Miami, 1994, reed. 1996
- Les récoltes de la folie – Novel, Paris, 1996
- Les terres entourées de larmes – Novel, Paris, 2002
- Keep on Keepin'On, English translation of Pè Sèt ! by Jack Hirschman, iUniverse, 2006
- Rete! Kote Lamèsi – Novel written in Haitian Creole, Port-au-Prince, 2008.
- Partir sur un coursier de nuages – Novel, Paris, 2008.
- Échos en fuite – Compilation of Poems, Paris, 2010
- Istwa Nanm Mwen – Compilation of Poems Written in Haitian Creole, Port-au-Prince, 2010
- Jérémie et sa Verdoyante Grand'Anse – Photography and Poems, Coconut Creek, 2012
- Le Domic'île – Compilation of Poems, New York, 2012
- Rekot Powetik – Poems from Students of Ecole Normale de Marfranc, in French and Haitian Creole, Edited by Josaphat-R Large, Ruptures, Washington, 2013
- Mississippi Blues – Novel, published by Ruptures, Washington, D.C., 2015

== Compact discs ==
- Eko Dlo [LaGrandans debòde] – Poems in Creole with background music by Haitian pianist Eddy Prophète, Montréal, 2006
- 5 Années de Textes et de Chansons des Vendredis littéraires, Poems in French and in Creole by Frankétienne, Lyonel Trouillot, Claude Pierre and Josaphat-Robert Large, August 2000.

== Play ==
- La voix du Bisaïeul – Play in French (Stage Director Max Kénol), New York July 1998
- Dany Laferriere en pyjama – Presented at United Nations (Stage Director Max Kénol), New York, February 2014
- Les colis de la traite – Play written for La Semaine des victimes de l'esclavage for United Nations, (Stage Director Max Kénol), NY 2014

== Short Story ==
- Rosanna – Mystery fiction in "Haiti Noir", Edited by Edwidge Danticat, Akashic Books, New York, 2011
- Dark Days in Port-au-Prince, Exquisite Corpse, Part 5 by J-R Large, Part 2 by Ibi Zoboi, Part 1-6 by Roxane Gay, Part 3 by Jessica Fievre, Part 4 by K Ulysse, Akashic Books, Brooklyn, NY, 2014

== Awards ==
- Prix littéraire des Caraïbes 2003 [Caribbean literary Prize] given by L'Association des Ecrivains de langue française (The Association of French writers)
- Finaliste Concours Ouessant, 2002 (Finalist Ushant literary contest, in August 2002).
- Nominated for Haitian Grand Literary Prize in 2004, at the Miami Book Fair International of 2004.
- Finaliste Carbet Prize 2008 with Novel Partir sur un coursier de nuages
