= List of newspapers in Haiti =

This is a list of newspapers in Haiti

== Current ==
- Alterpresse (online)
- AyiboPost est. 2015 (online)
- Balistrad, est. 2018 (Haitian online newspaper (media))
- Le Nouvelliste, est. 1898
- Le National, est. 2015
- Le Matin, est. 1907
- Le Moniteur, Port-au-Prince, est. 1845 (official journal)
- Haïti Liberté, est. 2007 (weekly, print and online)
- Haïti Observateur
- Haïti en Marche (weekly)
- Haïti Progrès (weekly)
- Haiti Press Network (online)
- Hebdo24 (online)
- Impulse Webmedias (online)
- Juno7 (online)
- Kominotek (online)
- Lakay Weekly (weekly)
- Nalky Media (online)
- Rezo Nòdwès (Haitian-language and French, online newspaper)
- Safety Promo, est.2014, online
- Vant Bèf Info (online)

== Defunct ==
- Le Cap, established 1804 in Cap-Haïtien
- Courrier du Soir
- L'Essor
- Feuille du Commerce, Port-au-Prince
- Gazette des Tribuneaux
- Haiti Commerciale, Industrielle et Agricole
- Haiti-Journal (OCLC 32418370)
- Haiti Sun (established 1950)
- Haiti Times (established 1984)
- L’Eclaireur haytien, ou Le Parfait patriote, later L’Eclaireur haytien (established 1818 in Port au Prince by Félix Darfour)
- L'Informateur Haitien
- Journal du Commerce, active 1820s? in Cap-Haïtien
- Le Manifeste, Port-au-Prince
- Le Telegraphe, Port-au-Prince
- Le Temps, Port-au-Prince
- L'Union, Port-au-Prince

== See also ==
- List of Haitian journalists
- Media of Haiti
- Haitian literature
- List of newspapers
- Balistrad

== Bibliography ==
- Justin Emmanuel Castera (1986). Bref coup d'oeil sur les origines de la presse haïtienne, 1764-1850 (in French).
- Jean Desquiron (ed.). Haïti à la une: une anthologie de la presse haïtienne de 1724 à 1934 (in French). OCLC 30509786. (6 volumes, 1993–1997)
