= 2001 Haitian coup attempt =

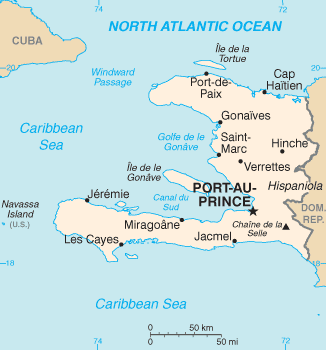
Date	December 17, 2001
Location	Haiti
Result	Coup attempt failed; government retains control: Retaliatory attacks by Aristide supporters following the coup

Belligerents
Government of Haiti	Ex-soldiers

Commanders and leaders
Jean-Bertrand Aristide	Guy Phillipe (allegedly); Lucien Gervais (allegedly)

Strength
Unknown	30–80 gunmen

Casualties and losses
- 13 killed

The 2001 Haitian coup attempt, involving around 30–80 armed gunmen part of the disbanded armed forces, was a foiled attempt at overthrowing President Jean Bertrand Aristide in Haiti. Following the coup attempt, partisans part of the ruling Fanmi Lavalas party and supporters of President Aristide reacted by engaging in widespread violence across the country, targeting opposition figures and journalists. The period of chaos was characterized by attacks, pillaging, and arson. Opposition parties accused the president of using the purported coup attempt as pretext to quell dissent. The violence against the press caused some 15 journalists to seek asylum abroad and as many as 40 to go into hiding. The coup attempt and ensuing chaos resulted in at least 13 deaths.

== Coup ==
At 3 am on December 17, 2001, local radio stations reported an attack on the National Palace, describing it as a commando-style assault. Three hours later, Jacques Maurice, a government spokesman, publicly announced an attempted coup, stating that 80 gunmen had infiltrated the National Palace. Maurice indicated the attackers were led by Guy Phillipe, a police commissioner in exile in the Dominican Republic. He also mentioned a simultaneous attack on the National Penitentiary before being rebuffed, implicating Lucien Gervais, a former military figure, as another leader behind the coup. The local media provided continuous coverage, with journalists stationed at Champs de Mars Square reporting live.

Jean Auriel, head of presidential security, informed the press the assailants had fled in pickup trucks, with elite police forces regaining control of the palace. By noon, Minister of Culture and Communication Guy Paul signaled the end of the coup attempt and urged the public to remain calm. In the afternoon, National Police spokesman Jean Dady Siméon confirmed the attempted coup involved about 30 assailants, reporting that the confrontation had left five dead, including two policemen, one assailant, and two civilians. At the time of the coup, President Aristide and his family were not present at the National Palace; instead, they were at their residence in suburban Tabarre located five kilometers away from the palace. Ultimately, seven of the attackers were captured.

At a press conference held by President Aristide following the coup attempt, he described it as a threat to democracy and praised the people's response in defending democracy, calling for peaceful mobilization to protect democracy. Following the press conference, the president delivered a "message of peace," praising the police and citizens for preventing the coup plotters from escaping and stressed the need for continued solidarity between the people and police.

== Aftermath ==
Hours after the failed coup attempt, government supporters armed themselves with machetes and sticks, taking to the streets to harass members of the opposition, including figures from the Struggling People's Organization (OPL) and Democratic Convergence, as well as the media. Local radio stations in the capital of Port-au-Prince were threatened with destruction and journalists faced violent reprisals while the homes of many opposition figures and offices were attacked, looted, and burned. The unrest spread into other cities:

- In Cap-Haïtien, multiple residencies were attacked. Pastor Milton Chery, member of the OPL, saw his home vandalized, while OPL spokesman Eluscat Charles' home was looted and burned. The homes of government critic Jacques Etienne and the Tanis brothers, both members of Democratic Convergence, were not spared and suffered the same fate.
- In Cayes, Gabriel Fortuné's construction company was pillaged, with two tow trucks being burned down. The homes of OPL functionaries, namely Jean Robert Jeune and Wilfred Jean-Baptiste, were damaged and pillaged, alongside Convergence members Kessel Cillius and Pierre Richard.
- In Gonaïves, the residencies of opposition figures – Pastor Luc Mésadieu, President of Mochrena, and Pastor Sylivo Dieudonné, Vice President of Mochrena – were burned down. Meanwhile, journalist Duc Jonathan Joseph, Radio Metropole's correspondent, went missing.
- In Grande Rivière du Nord, the local OPL headquarters became a target for attack and looting.
- In Jacmel, the home of Convergence spokesman Milot Gousse was stoned.
- In Jérémie, the city saw OPL representative Lensky Cassamajor enduring a brutal beating, only narrowly escaping lynching. Offices of CATH were also razed, and Democratic Convergence members were forced into hiding.
- In Petit-Goâve, the homes of OPL member Jean Jasmin, Democratic Convergence member Déus Jean-François were burned down. Meanwhile, fifteen other homes were burned and five were subject to ransacking.
- In Thiotte, opposition figure Gabriel Davison and fifteen others went into hiding.

=== Attacks on the press ===
Throughout the day, journalists were subjected to threats and acts of violence. Reporters and radio stations were also targeted. As a result, many members of the press went into hiding for their own safety, with some even seeking refuge in foreign embassies. According to Reporters Without Borders, the systematic nature of the attacks suggests the deliberate targeting of the press by demonstrators, indicating a concerted effort to suppress freedom of the press and silence dissent. Journalists affected include:

- Thony Bélizaire (AFP photographer), Patrick Moussignac, Guérin Alexandre, Jean-Elie Moléus (Radio Caraïbes), and Guyler Delva (President of the Association of Haitian Journalists), who were all threatened with violence from armed demonstrators.
- Maxo Exil (Haiti Press Network Agency), who was held at gunpoint and threatened with death.
- Roger Damas (Radio Ibo), who was forced to surrender his press ID and cell phone.
- Pharès Duverné, Robert Philomé, and Yves Clausel Alexis (Radio Vision 2000), who were all coerced into shouting pro-Aristide slogans.
- Abel Descollines (Radio Galaxie), who went into hiding after receiving threats of execution. Gaston Janvier (RECAP) faced similar dangers.
- Radio Metropole reporters, who were attacked and held at gunpoint by government partisans driving state-owned vehicles.

Due to the grave threats of violence, multiple radio stations – Radio Quisqueya, Radio Metropole, Radio Vision 2000, Radio Signal FM, and Radio Caraïbes – were forced to halt broadcasts temporarily. Radio Caraïbes in particular halted its operations for days.

=== Condemnation ===
Initially, international observers condemned the coup attempt. Following the retaliatory attacks committed by government supporters however, reactions shifted to addressing the violence against opposition parties and media. The outpouring of reactions domestically and abroad is as follows:

- Women's rights organizations, namely ENFOFANM, KAY FANM, and SOFA, questioned the legitimacy of the purported coup attempt and condemned the violence, likening the tactics used during the Duvalier dictatorship
- Human's rights organizations, such as the Inter-American Commission on Human Rights (CIDH) and Human Rights Watch, stressed the government's duty to protect human rights and called for a thorough investigation into the violence. Amnesty International demanded the Haitian government uphold the rule of law
- Press organizations, including the Reporters sans Frontières (RSF) and National Association of Haitian Media (ANMH), reported threats against journalists and condemned the violence against the media
- The international community, including the United States (US), European Union (EU), and France, largely condemned the violence and attacks that occurred in Haiti. The Dominican Republic denied involvement in the coup and affirmed their support to Aristide's administration

In response the Minister of Culture and Communication Guy Paul expressed regret over the violence but justified it as the consequences of public outrage.

By December 18, everyday life in the capital had returned to normal. Shops and banks reopened, and the roadblocks that had been set up during the unrest were removed from the streets.

== See also ==
- 1991 Haitian coup d'état
- 2004 Haitian coup d'état
