= Mass media in Haiti =

As in many developing countries, radio reaches the widest audience in Haiti. Estimates vary, but more than 300 radio stations are believed to broadcast throughout the country. Talk show programs serve as one of the few ways in which ordinary Haitians can speak out about politics and the government. A law passed in 1997 declares the airwaves to be the property of the government, but at least 133 unlicensed radio stations operate freely. In addition, there are 50 community-based stations throughout the country.

From September 2025 to September 2026, Television has experienced a dramatic expansion within the metropolitan area. 25 stations are broadcasting on the airwaves. Tele Haiti, the oldest TV station started in 1896, offers foreign channels.

Haiti's three French-language newspapers have a total circulation of less than 20,000. Small, Creole-language newspapers are printed irregularly.

== History ==
The media sector in Haiti has a long history and its situation today might be understood in the light of its progress through the years.

- 1724: Media existed for the first time in Haiti, with the newspaper of French journalist Joseph Payen who received an authorization from the King of France.
- 1764: Antoine Marie, a printer from France, founded in Cap-Haïtien the weekly publication: "Gazette de Saint-Domingue". The publication was forced to change locations to Port-au-Prince. lt had 1500 subscribers in 1788.
- The French Revolution in 1789 brought some freedom for the press, and other papers went into print. In 1802, fifty newspapers have been listed in Saint-Domingue.
- 1804: The « Gazette politique et commerciale d'Haïti», the first publication in the new independent country. This publication dropped out of circulation.
- 1806: When the Emperor Jean-Jacques Dessalines died on October 17, 1806, «Sentinelle d'Haïti» replaced the Gazette. lts name will change several times but spreading the government ideology remained its main objective.
- From 1804 to 1949. Max Bissainthe has counted 885 newspapers, some of which exist until today, such as Le Moniteur (1845), Le Nouvelliste (1898) and Le Matin (1907). The period before the American occupation was characterized by the breach and violation of ethical and professional rules. Successive governments and their opponents seized the press sector to their profit.
- Between 1914 and 1934, during the American occupation, three laws were adopted to regulate the press sector. These laws restricted freedom of the press. The more outspoken journalists were put in jail, e.g. Georges J. Petit, who went to prison seventeen times between 1915 and 1960. He wrote an article in Le Petit Impartial, along with Jacques Roumain who was also critical of the occupation and advocated that the youth take a stand.
- 1930: Emergence of the broadcasting media. Print media was almost completely abandoned. Broadcasting imposed itself as a real alternative in the country where nearly 85% people were illiterate. Several of today's well-known stations were created during this time period, such as Radio Haiti (1935) and Radio Caraïbes in Port-au-Prince (1949). The provinces, Radio Voix du Nord (1945), Radio Citadelle (1950) and Voix Évangélique in the North department and Radio Indépendance in Gonaïves/Artibonite (1953) emerged.
- 1957–1986. The coming of TV established the domination of audiovisual media. Télé Haiti, in 1959, became the first TV station in the country as a callsign 4VMR-TV. During the twenty-nine year Duvalier dictatorship, there is systematic violation of basic freedoms of the press; harassment, torture of journalists, censorship. Many journalists went into exile.
- In 1979, the government launched the Télévision Nationale d'Haïti (TNH) a TV "real" mass medium. Unfortunately, since its creation TNH has remained an instrument of propaganda for the government.
- Since 1986, the press sector has experienced constant change. Indeed, several journalists have been imprisoned or killed for their ideology, their affinity for political groups or their objectivity.
- The hope for a free media vanished with the military coup against Jean-Bertrand Aristide.

When Aristide returned from exile in 1994, the press was expecting an improvement in freedom. The assassination of Jean-Léopold Dominique, owner and director of Radio Haiti-Inter in 2000, and Brignol Lindor, political columnist and editorial director in Radio Echo 2000 in 2001 showed that the hope for assuring press freedom was destined for disillusionment.

== Governmental policy and Regulation ==
The decree of October 12, 1977, published during Jean Claude Duvalier's regime, the principal document governing the operation of the sector of telecommunications in Haiti gives the Haitian State the monopoly of services in telecommunications. The authority placed in control of this sector is the National Council of Telecommunications (CONATEL).

The press and media sector is running under a Decree issued on July 31, 1986 by the General' Henri Namphy's government. This publication makes provision for aIl press industries, which outline the privileges and duties that go with the media professions.

"Press" refers to the followings:

- Newspapers or all kind of periodical publications
- Broadcasting and television
- Printing house, bookshop, publishing house
- Press agencies

Journalists are the press enterprise's editors, radio broadcast announcers, TV presenters, cameramen, researchers, columnists, contributors to the editing, editors, translators, reporters, picture editors, and photojournalists.

The Ministry of Information and Coordination issue accreditation cards, renewable each year, to the press enterprises that have legal registration. The conditions for obtaining a professional card that attest the capacity of a journalist include a University degree or equivalent, and a credential card from a registered organ of the press.

Foreign journalists who want to practice their profession in Haiti have to request a professional card from the Ministry of Information and Coordination.

The creation of the press enterprise is subject to a prior declaration addressed to the Ministry of Information and Coordination, the National Archives and the National Library for a registration of copyright. The owner of an audiovisual media makes a declaration to the Ministry of Publics Works, Transport and Communication, and the Ministry of Justice.

== Media landscape ==
In Haiti, three news agencies, two daily and two weekly newspapers published in the capital, Port-au-Prince, form the core of the written press. Other periodicals (political journals and varieties magazines) exist, but appear to be very irregular.

Nearly 400 radio and TV stations broadcast on Haitian territory. Only half work legally, with a license of Conatel, the agency that regulates communications.

Experts talk of a large territorial coverage by those 400 media, for a country of 10 million people and 27,750 sq km. However, the statistics for measuring the audience ratings and penetration are non-existent. In a country where the literacy rate is 53% and the standard of living low, we know that radio is the most popular medium.

The majority of 400 radios and TVs are small independent businesses, mainly concentrated in big cities. They broadcast on FM. AM transmitters are too costly to operate.

Public media, grouped in the consortium RTNH (Radio Télévision Nationale d’Haïti), despite the out datedness of their equipment, cover much of the territory.

Haiti has thirty community radio stations, which are located in rural areas. They are managed by farmers' organizations. They diffuse news, educational programs on health, agriculture and environment.

The religious stations are present in many localities. Excepted the stations of the Baptist network Radio Lumière, these Christian media are managed by local churches or dioceses.

Unlike other countries in the region, there are no big press groups, with large financial resources in Haiti. However, a movement of grouping of stations begins with the constitution of two groups of media, from the two dailies in the country: Le Nouvelliste group and Le Nouveau Matin SA group, which manage each a daily journal, a weekly magazine (respectively, Ticket Magazine and Spotlight Magazine), online newspapers including Balistrad and Ayibopost, one or two radio stations, and soon television channels.

Another group, Caraïbes FM, consists of seven radio stations and two TV channels network. There is a trend for most important radio stations to have their own TV channel.

Many stations of the capital work in network with radios of province, through the country. They broadcast especially news.

All major Haitian media have their own websites, which distributes audio or written contents. These texts or audio signals are widely relayed by other media in the Haitian Diaspora. Three television channels are broadcast by the site JumpTV.com. Four news agencies publish only on the Internet: Balistrad, Agence Haitienne de Presse, Haiti Press Network and MediAlternatif.

== Formats ==
=== Newspapers ===
Newspapers in Haiti include the following:

- Balistrad, est. 2018 (online)
- Le Nouvelliste, est. 1898
- Le National, est. 2015
- Le Matin, est. 1907 (Defunct media)
- Le Moniteur, est. 1845 (official journal)
- Haïti Liberté, est. 2007
- Haïti Observateur
- Haïti en Marche
- Haïti Progrès

=== Radio ===
Radio stations in Haiti include the following:

- Radio Antilles Internationale, est. 1984
- Radio Caraïbes, est. 1949
- Radio Cacique, est. 1961
- Radio Celeste, est. 1991
- Radio Galaxie, est. 1990
- Radio Ginen, est. 1994 http://haitimedia.live/radio/92-9-fm-radio-ginen/
- Radio Kadans FM, est. 1991
- Radio Kiskeya, est. 1994 http://haitimedia.live/radio/88-5-fm-radio-kiskeya/
- Radio Lakansyel
- Radio Lumière, est. 1959 http://haitimedia.live/radio/95-9-fm-radio-lumiere/
- Radio Magic Stereo, est. 1991
- Radio Métropole, est. 1970 http://haitimedia.live/radio/100-1-fm-radio-metropole/
- Signal FM http://haitimedia.live/radio/90-5-fm-signal-fm/
- Radio Soleil
- Radio Tele Zenith
- Radio Vision 2000 http://haitimedia.live/radio/99-3-radio-vision-2000/

Defunct stations include:

- Radio Haiti-Inter, 1935-2003

=== Television ===
TV stations in Haiti include the following:

- Tele Caraibes http://hbiptv.com/tele-caraibes/
- Tele Ginen http://hbiptv.com/tele-ginen/
- Tele Metropole http://hbiptv.com/tele-metropole/
- Television Nationale d'Haiti http://hbiptv.com/tele-nationale-dhaiti/
- Nago TV http://nago.tv
- Radio Tele 6 Univers http://hbiptv.com/tele-6-univers/
- Tele Kiskeya http://hbiptv.com/tele-kiskeya/
- Tele Super Star http://hbiptv.com/tele-super-star/
- Tele Espace http://hbiptv.com/tele-espace-2/
- Hebdo TV http://hbiptv.com/hebdotvcom/
- Tele Eclair http://hbiptv.com/tele-eclair/
- Tele Hirondelle http://hbiptv.com/tele-hirondelle/
- Tele Signal http://hbiptv.com/tele-signal/
- Tele Amani-Y http://hbiptv.com/tele-amani-y/
- Tele Haiti ' http://telehaiti.com/
- Tele Variété Chaine 30 https://www.tva30.com/
- Netalkole TV https://haitibroadcasting.com/netalkoletv/

== Media’s development: challenges and advantages ==
=== Challenges ===
The Haitian press faces many challenges with limited resources.

- First challenge: survive as a company - or nonprofit institution - in a country economically weak and politically fragile. The majority of the Haitian media are small businesses operating in a very risky and very competitive.

The media fail to operate properly and to meet their financial obligations, as renew their equipment and improve working conditions and salaries of technicians and journalists. In Haiti, due to major economic difficulties facing the country, the advertising market is low and is concentrated mainly in the capital, Port-au-Prince. Because of rationing electricity, the operating budget of the media is burdened by the cost of fuel and maintenance of generators. The media in the Diaspora, Canada and the United States, operating in a more structured, less confront these problems, due also to the greater access to funding sources, such as advertising and subsidies.

- The second challenge: to manage the precarious and the low skill level of its employees. Very few journalists are able to live decently on their wages. Very few are trained properly, even though the number of training schools tends to increase.
- Third challenge: to carry out its mission of information. Because of the deficiencies in the education system, it is incumbent upon the media, particularly radio, to inform and educate the Haitian people. This requires large financial resources and adequate human resources.

Illiteracy and low enrolment rates are obstacles that prevent the spread of the media, including the written press. The Haitian journalists often become mercenaries, against ethics and professional ethics. This is a serious credibility problem.

- Fourth challenge: working in security. Journalists can cope with various acts of violence: persecution, threats, intimidation, arrests, attacks on the facilities. These physical attacks can be fatal. Example murder of Jean Dominique, were never punished until today.
- Fifth challenge: master the new technologies. As elsewhere in the world, the Haitian Press faces the benefits but also the constraints created by the new information technologies and communication.

The development of the Internet and cellular phones over the past five years has allowed the media to benefit from a better flow of information. But it has also revealed other media competitors, such as webradios, webTV, sites for sharing videos, such YouTube, blogs, and so on.

Despite the cyclical and structural problems, the Haitian media manage to reflect a certain vitality of journalism in Haiti and to forge a sense that the media have a crucial role to play in the country's future.

=== Advantages ===
The development of the Internet and cellular phones over the past five years has allowed the media to benefit from a better flow of information. But it also revealed other media competitors, including web radios, web TV, sharing sites like YouTube videos, blogs, and so on.

== See also ==
- Telecommunications in Haiti

== Bibliography ==
in English

- Peter Habermann (1990). "Mass Media in Haiti". In Stuart H. Surlin; Walter C. Soderlund (eds.). Mass Media and the Caribbean. New York: Gordon and Breach. pp. 193–208. ISBN 978-2-88124-447-6.
- Michael R. Hall (2012). "Radio and Television". Historical Dictionary of Haiti. Scarecrow Press. p. 219+. ISBN 978-0-8108-7549-4.; + "Press", p. 214
- "Haiti: Media and Telecoms Landscape Guide", Infoasaid.org, UK, 2012, archived from the original on 2014-02-10 – via Internet Archive Wayback Machine
- Jane Regan (2014), "Watchdogging Haiti's Reconstruction from the Grassroots", Ijec.org, Investigative Journalism Education Consortium. (About alternative and community media)
- "Haitian Media Landscape", Assessment: Media, Human Rights & Development Communications in Haiti (PDF), United States Agency for International Development, 2015, pp. 22–29, archived from the original (PDF) on February 11, 2017 + List of community radio stations, p. 68+
- Shearon Roberts (2015), "Five years after earthquake, Haiti's journalists show resilience amid threats to freedom of the press", Journalism in the Americas, University of Texas at Austin, Knight Center for Journalism in the Americas
- "Haiti", Freedom of the Press, US: Freedom House, 2016, OCLC 57509361

in French

- R Barnabé, P Breton (2007). "Le coaching: une approche respectueuse des journalistes et des gestionnaires de médias haïtiens" (PDF). Les Cahiers du journalisme (in French) (17). ISSN 2118-7169.
- Edner Fils Décime (March 12, 2012), "Haiti-Presse: La pratique du journalisme à Port-au-Prince, entre "journalisme de marché" et Éthique" [The practice of journalism in Port-au-Prince, between 'market journalism' and ethics], Alterpresse (in French)
