= Gary Klang =

Haitian-Canadian poet and novelist

Gary Klang (born December 28, 1941, in Port-au-Prince Haiti), is a Haitian-Canadian poet and novelist. Since 2007, he is the president of the prestigious "Conseil des Écrivains francophones d'Amérique" (Council of America's francophone writers). Klang's work is very rich. It includes novels, poetry, short stories and essays. On July 14, 2000, "l'Union Française à Montréal" (the French Union of Montreal) chose Gary as the promoter of the French national holiday marking the storming of the Bastille. The same day, the same French Union participated in the launch of his collection of verses "La terre est vide comme une étoile". Gary Klang is also a member of the "Association des Ecrivains Québécois (UNEQ)" (Association of Quebec's writers), a member of the "Association des Ecrivains de langue française" (Association of writers of French origin) and of the PEN Club of Montreal. He was nominated for the Haitian grand Literary Prize of 2004, together with Edwidge Danticat, René Depestre, Frankétienne, Dany Laferrière, Josaphat-Robert Large and Leslie Manigat (Ex President of Haiti, the winner of the Prize).

== Exile ==
Gary Klang graduated from the "Institution Saint-Louis de Gonzague" in Port-au-Prince. He left Haiti in the 1960s, at the worst time of the Duvalier's dictatorship. In Paris where he went, he received a PhD in literature at Sorbonne University. His thesis is on Marcel Proust, the famous French novelist. It was in France that Gary met Maggy, the French student from Brittany who later became his wife. In 1973, they left together for Canada where they settled in Montreal. At first, Gary has been a professor of stylistics at the Université de Montréal. But, as he never like teaching, he changed hat and became a translator at the famous Engineering firm SNC-Lavalin. He retired from that position in 2006. Gary is very active in the French literary world. He participated in festivals in Mali (2007), Benin (2009) and Haiti (2007), not to mention Canada (Festival des Trois-Rivières) (2008)

== Works ==
=== Novels ===
- Haïti! Haïti! written with Anthony Phelps. Montréal: Libre Expression, 1985.
- L'île aux deux visages. Brossard (Canada): Humanitas, 1997.
- L'adolescent qui regardait passer la vie. Brossard (Canada): Humanitas, 1998.
- Un homme seul est toujours en mauvaise compagnie. Montréal: Mémoire d'encrier, 2005.
- Monologue pour une scène vide. Montréal: Dialogue Nord-Sud, 2013.
- Le massacre de Jérémie - opération vengeance, réédition de Haïti ! Haïti ! écrit en collaboration avec Anthony Phelps. Montréal: Dialogue Nord-Sud, 2015.

=== Poetry ===
- Ex-île. Grenoble: Éditions de la Vague à l'âme, 1988.
- Je veux chanter la mer, suivi de Les Fleurs ont la saveur de l'aube. Montréal: Humanitas, 1993.
- Moi natif natal, suivi de Le Temps du vide. Montréal: Humanitas, 1995.
- La terre est vide comme une étoile. Brossard (Canada): Humanitas, 2000.
- La vraie vie est absente. Brossard (Canada): Humanitas, 2002.
- Il est grand temps de rallumer les étoiles. Montréal: Mémoire d'encrier, 2007.

=== Short stories ===
- Kafka m'a dit. Longueuil: Humanitas, 2004.
- « Elle n'avait peur de rien ». Nul n'est une île: Solidarité Haïti. Sous la direction de Stanley Péan et Rodney Saint-Éloi. Montréal: Mémoire d'encrier, 2004: 107–115.
- Les chiens noirs. Montréal: Plume & Encre, 2006.

=== Essays ===
- La méditation transcendantale. Montréal: Stanké, 1976.
- Je ne veux pas mourir chauve à Montréal. Brossard (Canada): Humanitas, 1999.

== Article on the Author ==
- La bataille de Jérémie. Jeune Afrique 1345 (October 15, 1986).
- Ex-île au Canada. Le Dauphiné libéré (November 16, 1988).
- Être écrivain en exil. Le Nouvelliste (February 1, 2001).
- L'écrivain haïtien Gary Klang en compagnie de Rimbaud, Villon, Brassens, Léo Ferré. Haïti en Marche (August 27, 2003).
- L'écrivain haïtien en grande compagnie. Le Nouvelliste (September 5–7, 2003).
- Hébert, François. Un thriller à la sauce haïtienne, politique, action et fiction. Le Devoir (Montréal, June 1, 1985).
- Hérard, Huguette. L'ex-île de Klang. Le Matin (Port-au-Prince, September 23–25, 1989).
- Jean-Gilles, Gesler. Gary Klang, un auteur accompli. Haïti en Marche (January 31, 1996).
- Josaphat-Robert Large. Gary Klang, la poésie dans le temps du vide. Haïti en Marche (April 17, 1996).
- Josaphat-Robert Large. Esquisses d'une écriture élégante, Je veux chanter la mer de Gary Klang. Haïti en Marche (December 15, 1993).
- Peterson, Michel. Je ne veux pas mourir chauve à Montréal, d'Alain Stanké à Monique LaRue, un écrivain raconte. Nuit Blanche (Quebec) 76 (1999): 28.
- Saint-Cyr, Guy-Robert. Gary Klang ou le regard d'un adolescent sur la vie. Le Nouvelliste (July 21, 1999).
- Saint-Cyr, Guy-Robert. Considérations sur l'œuvre de Gary Klang. Haïti en Marche (February 4, 2004).
- Saint-Cyr, Guy-Robert. Les confidences de Kafka. Propos sur la dernière publication de Gary Klang. Le Matin (Port-au-Prince) 32210 (June 30, 2004).
- Sannon, Fritz-Meyer. L'île aux deux visages, roman de Gary Klang. Haïtiens Aujourd'hui (fébruary-mars 1998).
- Séguin, Marcel. Gary Klang, chantre d'Haïti. Haïti en Marche (November 1, 1995).

== Videos ==
- Entretien avec Claudine Bertrand sur Radio France-Québec on YouTube
- Lecture de poèmes au Bénin (Cotonou). (Reading in Bénin (Cotonou) on YouTube)
- Entretien avec Josaphat-Robert Large (Talk between 2 authors on YouTube)

== Sources ==
- La Moisson littéraire. Montréal: Proteau, 1993: 1–9.
- 101 Poètes en Québec. Montréal: Guérin, 1995: 223–225.
- Vingt ans d'Estuaire. Montréal: Estuaire, 1996: 146.
- Le dernier poème du millénaire. Montréal: Estuaire, 1999: 105.
- Dictionnaire des poètes d'ici de 1606 à nos jours. Montréal: Guérin, 2001: 552.
- Le 11 septembre des poètes du Québec. Montréal: Trait-d'Union, 2002: 124.
- Anthologie de la poésie haïtienne contemporaine, 1945–1999, French and Haitian Creole texts collected by Raymond Philoctète. Montréal: Cidihca, 1998: 148–151.
- Panorama de la littérature haïtienne de la diaspora. Pierre-Raymond Dumas. Port-au-Prince: L'Imprimateur II, 2000: 268–271.
- Toute terre est prison, poème. Une journée haïtienne, by Thomas C. Spear. Montréal: Mémoire d'encrier / Paris: Présence africaine, 2007: 67–70.
