= Sandra Dessalines =

Haitian artist

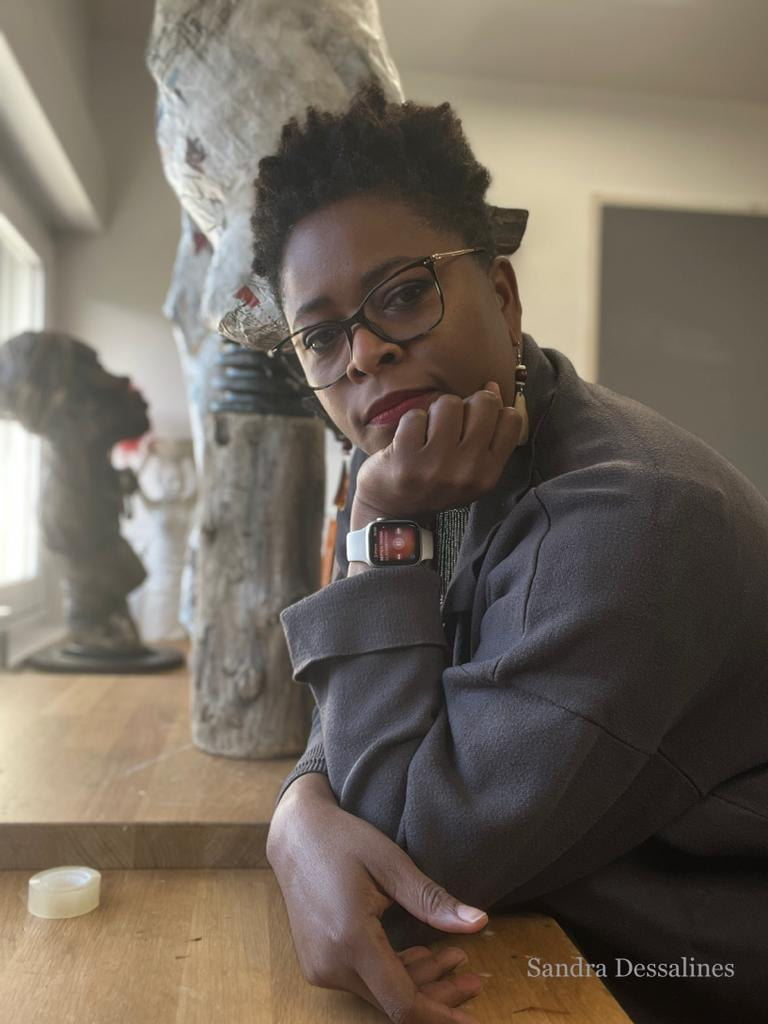
- Born: Wilberte Dessalines; Port-au-Prince, Haiti
- Education: Quisqueya University, INSA Toulouse
- Awards: Vermeil Medal
- Style: Sculpture, Painting
- Movement: Naive art
- Materials: Paper, Mixed media, Papier-mâché, Plywood, Oil paint

Sandra Dessalines is a self-taught Haitian visual artist and sculptor. Her artwork is inspired and informed by Haitian culture, history, and artistic tradition.

== Biography ==
Born Wilberte Dessalines in Carrefour, Haiti, Dessalines grew up with multiple brothers and sisters. She was interested in art at a young age but her parents made her choose a different career path as they did not think being a Black female artist in an 'underdeveloped country' was possible.

She is a descendant of Jean-Jacques Dessalines.

Dessalines studied agricultural engineering at Quisqueya University. In 2000, she moved to Toulouse, France to continue her studies at the Institut national des sciences appliquées de Toulouse.

Dessalines currently lives in Basque Country.

Dessalines began making art professionally after the 2010 Haiti earthquake, losing her cousin and neighbors in the natural disaster. She realized that she was hiding herself and that people can loose everything in an instant. "I still have a rather special relationship with art. It's between denial and affirmation. It clicked in 2010 following the earthquake in Haiti," Dessalines later told France Info.

She cites Rémi Trotereau, Marc Petit, and Ousmane Saw as sources of artistic inspiration. Dessalines uses mixed-materials and papier-mâché to make her art. Her mixed materials have included wood, cardboard, beads, fabrics, organic materials, and plastics. Her art explores themes of postcolonialism, Vodou, "Haiti’s history, Black identity, collective memory, and the condition of women." Her art often centers on overlooked women in Haitian history and/or the impact of slavery and colonization.

In a 2019 interview, Dessalines described herself as "an artist who works on themes that shape the culture of my island, Haiti. The shapes, lights, contrasts, shadows of my characters come to life in an atypical setting: my kitchen which serves as my workshop."

== Awards and honors ==
In October 2024, she was awarded the public prize from the Lmh Concept Events Art and Design. On October 11, 2025, Dessalines was awarded the Vermeil Medal by La Société académique Arts-Sciences-Lettres.

== Exhibitions ==
- June–August 2026: "Ce qui nous relie:Geste de présence et de mémoire", City Hall, Tremblay-en-France
- January 2024: "Voyages identitaires", André Arsenec Gallery, Fort-de-France
- June 2022: "Rencontre Des Couleurs", La Maison des Passages, Lyon
- September–October 2021: "The chestnuts of freedom", Space Louis Delgrès, Nantes
- May–June 2019: "On n’est pas monté sans bagages", Space Louis Delgrès, Nantes
- July–August 2018: "Haïti Exposition", 7 rue de la Citadelle, Saint-Jean-Pied-de-Port
- March 2018: Naive Art Exhibition, Jacques Ellul Media Library, Pessac
- December 2016–February 2017: "Haïti Exposition", Town Hall, Saint-Jean-Pied-de-Port
- November–December 2016: "Haiti", Château Palmer
- May 2014: Solo Exhibition, Gare de l'Art, Saint-Paul-en-Born
