= Brignol Lindor =

Haitian journalist (1970–2001)

- Born: November 4, 1970; Petit-Goâve, Haiti
- Died: December 3, 2001 (aged 31); L'Acul, Haiti
- Cause of death: Murdered by stoning and mutilation
- Education: École de Droit des Gonaïves
- Alma mater: École Nationale des Palmes (primary); Lycee Faustin Soulouque (secondary)
- Occupations: Radio journalist and news director, lawyer, and teacher
- Employer: Radio Echo 2000; Radio Signal FM (previously)
- Title: News Director (radio station)

Brignol Lindor (/ˈbriːnjoʊl ˈlɪndɔːr/; 4 November 1970 – 3 December 2001), was a Haitian radio journalist and news editor, lawyer and teacher. Lindor was a prominent voice in politics, speaking mostly on behalf of the Democratic interests of the Haitian people. His brutal murder was blamed on threats from leftist politicians who supported President Jean-Bertrand Aristide.

== Personal ==
Lindor was born in Petit-Goâve on 4 November 1970. Lindor had a younger brother, Moréno, and younger sisters, Nene, Dedel, Liline and Marie Michele. He attended École Nationale des Palmes for his primary education and went on to Lycee Faustin Soulouque for his secondary education, which are both in Petit-Goâve. He went on to study journalism and law in the Faculté de Droit et des Sciences Economiques at the École de Droit des Gonaïves, where he earned his law degree.

== Career ==
Lindor began his career as a journalist as a member of the Haitian Press Agency, and then spent four years as a correspondent for at Radio Signal FM. Lindor later helped organize the Association des Journalistes de Petit Goave, where he served as Adjunct General Secretary, and worked as the news editor for the private station Radio Echo 2000 from 1995 until 2001. During this time he also worked as a customs agent and taught. At Radio Echo 2000, he hosted a political show called "Dialogue," on which he interviewed political figures, including Aristide supporters. On 28 November 2001, he conducted an interview with members of the 15-party opposition coalition Convergence Démocratique (English: Democratic Convergence). Because of his open opposition to the Fanmi Lavalas political party, the Mayor had given him the nickname "Iron Pants." This nickname also earned Lindor countless death threats from local authorities and radical supporters of President Aristide.

In addition to being a news editor, Lindor also worked as an inspector at the local customs office, and also taught social science classes at the Caribbean Secondary Centre school in Petit-Goâve.

== Death ==
Petit-Goâve, Haiti is shown within Haiti relative to the capital Port-au-Prince.

On the morning of 3 December 2001, Lindor and Emmanuel Espoir Clédanor, a former journalist for Radio Plus, were en route to the village of Miragoâne. When they reached L'Acul, approximately 5 km outside of Petit-Goâve, their vehicle was attacked by members of “Dómi Nan Bwa", who are supporters of President Jean-Bertrand Aristide's Fanmi Lavalas party. Clédanor managed to escape unharmed. Lindor attempted to hide in the nearby home of Mr. Zéphir Pétuel, President of the Assembly of the Communal Section (ASEC) of the First Plain and member of Popular Organization "Dòmi nan Bwa." As Lindor was chased by his attackers, he was forced to surrender and then hacked to death with machetes.

Just three days prior to Lindor's murder, Dumay Bony, the deputy mayor of Petit-Goâve, referred to Lindor as a terrorist, and encouraged others to apply the policy of "zero tolerance", which was a euphemism for lynching, to Lindor and a list of others considered to be affiliated with the opposition. Lindor became a specific target of this policy, because of his recent invitation to members of the Convergence Démocratique to appear on his radio show "Dialogue". The group openly criticized the governance of President Aristide and his Fanmi Lavalas Party.

Lindor's murder is presumed to be linked to an attack by members of the Convergence Démocratique on Joseph Céus Duverger, a chief of Domi nan Bwa, earlier that same morning. This is supported by the fact that Love Augustin, another member of the Convergence Démocratique, was about to be executed in his home by a group of Domi nan Bwa members, until they spotted Lindor's car pull up across the street, and immediately left Augustin to go attack Lindor. Ten Domi nan Bwa members have been indicted for Lindor's murder, including Raymond Désulmé, Sissi Dio, D'or Monal, Joël Jolifils, Saint-Juste Joubert, Bob Toussaint, Fritznel Doudoute (aka Lionel Doudoute), Ti Florian, Jean-Raymond Flory and Sedner Sainvilus (known as Ti Lapli), but only four have been arrested. Two of the charged, Joubert Saint-Juste and Jean-Remy Demosthene, were convicted and sentenced to life, seven more were convicted in absentia, and of those none have been arrested or brought into custody. One of the defendants was acquitted because he was arrested by a mistake in identity having shared the same name as one of the alleged killers.

Following his murder, Lindor's family still received many threats, and was ultimately forced to flee the country and seek asylum in Paris, France.

== Context ==
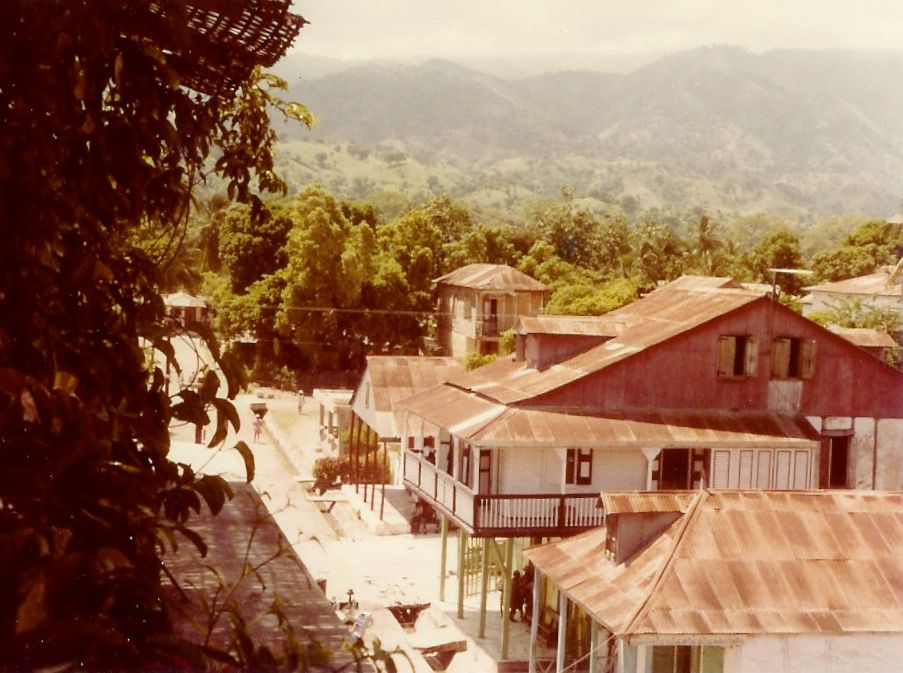
Petit-Goâve from around 1981.

Haiti has experienced several long periods of political tension, one of which can be traced back to the decision by a group of small political organizations to boycott the presidential elections of 2000. This boycott was their way of protesting the parliamentary elections earlier that year, which they claimed had fraudulently awarded 15 of the 19 Senate seats and eighty percent of seats in the House of Assembly to Jean Bertrand Aristide's newly formed Fanmi Lavalas party. This group of political organizations later joined to form an alliance known as the Convergence Démocratique, also referred to as the "opposition," which sought to undermine the authority of President Aristide.

Directly related to this political tension, the beginning of 2001 marked an enormous decline in press freedom in Haiti, with close to 40 journalists having faced violent threats or attacks in that year alone. The majority of these threats and attacks were initiated by either police or supporters of President Aristide's Fanmi Lavalas Party, therefore greatly reducing the likelihood of any government intervention on behalf of the victims of this violence. That situation was a direct result of President Aristide's instatement of a "zero tolerance" campaign against crime in June of that year. Through this campaign, police officers were allowed and even encouraged to punish criminals on the spot, without a trial, if they are caught red-handed. Members of the press/media in Haiti were often characterized by President Aristide as members of the opposition, but such allegations served as a way of justifying the violence that was being committed against them, regardless of whether or not the allegations were in fact true.

Lindor has not been the only journalist to be killed in Haiti, as in 2000 Jean Léopold Dominique of Radio Haiti-Inter and Gérard Denoze of Radio Plus met the same fate.

== Impact ==
Lindor proved to be a prominent and influential voice for democracy in Haiti, specifically in his small town of Petit-Goâve. He did not associate himself with any one political group, but instead used his position at Radio Echo 2000 to give all groups the chance to share their views and opinions. The nature of Lindor's murder was especially gruesome, and acted as a new kind of warning for all members of the media that are considered to be aligned with the opposition. A dozen other journalists were so afraid that they would meet the same fate as Lindor that they fled the country soon after his murder.

Lindor was not the only Haitian journalist to be killed by supporters of Aristide, but his murder led to a particular increase in outrage toward Aristide's administration, causing the people of Petit-Goâve, followed by both national and international communities, to organize protests and even riots that demanded justice for Lindor.

He is one example across the region of journalists who have been threatened by politicians and killed as a result.

== Reactions ==
UNESCO Director-General Koïchiro Matsuura condemned the murder, saying, "The murder of Brignol Lindor, in horrific circumstances, will cause indignation among all who believe in the democratic future of Haiti and all those who struggle for freedom of expression. I request the highest authorities of the country to make all resources available to investigators so that this heinous crime will not go unpunished. A society that endeavors to heal the wounds of the past and build a democratic future needs all forums of expression and dialogue."

Nearly a full year after Lindor was murdered, more than 8,000 protesters walked through the streets of Petit-Goâve, Haiti, on 18 November 2002, and chanted "Down with Aristide!" and "Justice for Brignol!" according to a report by Radio Vision 2000

On the first anniversary of his murder, his brother Moreno issued a call for justice through Reporters Without Borders, saying, "I was at home the day I heard he had been chopped to death. I feared it was the end for my family. I was wrong. But we were threatened and had to flee the country. A year later, the killers can still count on the inertia of the authorities. The hardest thing is the injustice of it, that nobody has been punished. My brother was killed because he allowed everyone to speak on the radio. Haitians must be given their say and Brignol must be given justice."

== See also ==
- Media of Haiti
