= Raymond Joseph =

Haitian diplomat and journalist

Raymond Alcide Joseph

Haitian Ambassador to the United States
- In office 2005–2010
- Preceded by: Jean Casimir
- Succeeded by: Louis Harold Joseph

Personal details
- Born: August 31, 1931 (age 95) San Pedro de Macorís, Dominican Republic
- Citizenship: Haiti
- Education: Wheaton College, University of Chicago

Raymond Alcide Joseph (born August 31, 1931) is a Haitian diplomat, journalist, political activist and author. He was the Haitian ambassador to the United States from 2005 to 2010, and he resigned to be considered for candidacy in the 2010 Haitian presidential election. He is founder of the largest Haitian newspaper Haïti Observateur, based in Brooklyn, New York, that circulates not only for the Haitian diaspora but in Haiti as well. He ran an informant operation of sources surrounding, in, and out of the presidential palace in Haiti during the Duvalier authoritarian years, that leaked information for him to report, all while avoiding an attempt on his life.

== Early life and education ==
Joseph was born on August 31, 1931, in San Pedro de Macorís, Dominican Republic and lived in a batey (a sugar cane worker's town), whose family was originally from Les Cayes, Haiti. He is also a second cousin to the singer and rapper Wyclef Jean from his mother's side.

Raymond Joseph spent his early years surrounded by Christian missionaries. At birth, Joseph was refused Dominican Republic citizenship in several attempts. Following the genocide of over 10,000 Haitians at the border due to the Parsley Massacre imposed by dictator Rafael Trujillo, his father moved him and his brother back to Haiti, where Haitian citizenship was acquired. By age 10, in addition to Spanish, he was fluent in his native Haitian Creole, French, and English.

In 1954, he volunteered as an interpreter for a Baptist preacher, who assisted him in coming to the United States. Joseph enrolled in the Pastor's Course at Moody Bible Institute in Chicago, Illinois, in 1954. He was especially interested to study Ancient Greek and Hebrew so that he could make the first translation of the Bible for the Haitian people. In 1960, his translation of the New Testament and Psalms into Haitian Creole were published under the auspices of the American Bible Society.

In 1957, the dictator François "Papa Doc" Duvalier was elected President of Haiti, and Joseph became increasingly uncomfortable with the government. Joseph returned to the United States in 1961 and enrolled in the University of Chicago where he earned an MA in Social Anthropology in 1963.

== Career ==
Joseph subsequently moved to New York and became a leader in the opposition movement against the Duvalier regime. Along with his brother, Joseph founded the Haïti Observateur in 1971, which became influential and widely circulated among the Haitian diaspora. Joseph subsequently worked as a reporter at the Wall Street Journal and a columnist at the New York Sun.

Joseph turned his attention to the ongoing authoritative Duvalier regime in Haiti and built a network of informants inside the presidential palace of Port-au-Prince. He then would broadcast his intel from Brooklyn and in shortwaves in Haiti that became known as Radio Vonvon, in which anti-communist associates from California and Ronald Reagan played a role in its formation. In an attempt to uncover the leaks inside of the palace, François Duvalier murdered 19 members of its guard and sent an assassin to New York to dispose of Joseph. However, during a flight to New York, one of Joseph's sources was on the same plane and managed to tip him off. Expecting the assassin's arrival, he made a phone call to the would-be assassin, proposed a meeting and ended up having coffee together subsequently avoiding assassination.

When the regime of François Duvalier's son finally collapsed in 1986. In 1990, Joseph was appointed the Haitian Government's chargé d’affaires in Washington, D.C., and the representative of the Haitian Government to the Organization of American States. In this role, Joseph organized election observers from the international community to participate in the Haitian presidential election.

In 1991 Joseph returned to the Haïti Observateur where he remained until 2004, when he was again appointed Chargé d'Affaires in Washington, D.C. In 2005 acting president Boniface Alexandre chose Joseph to be Haiti's ambassador to the United States. In the aftermath of the catastrophic January 12, 2010 earthquake in Haiti, Joseph played an active role in mobilizing the international community's response to Haiti.

Joseph authored a book, For Whom the Dogs Spy: Haiti From the Duvalier Dictatorships to the Earthquake, Four Presidents, and Beyond, detailing the Duvalier regime right up until the 2010 Haiti earthquake.

== Presidential candidate ==
On July 27, 2010, Joseph confirmed his intention to run for President of Haiti in the November 28, 2010, election. He resigned the ambassadorship on August 1, 2010, and moved to Port-au-Prince. Joseph was dismissed from the Haitian presidential race by Haiti's Provisional Electoral Council.
