= Phanord Cabé =

Haitian Entrepreneur

- Born: Phanord Cabé; 14 February 1993 (age 32); Carrefour, Haiti
- Occupation: Founder of Hebdo24
- Years active: 2006–present
- Employer: Radio Caraïbes (2012–present)

Phanord Cabé (born 14 February 1993) is a Haitian Digital Personality and Entrepreneur. He is the Social Media Manager at Radio-Télévision Caraïbes.

== Biography ==
Phanord Cabé was born and grew up in Carrefour. Since 2010, he also works at Digicel as a technician and in 2012 he became head of social networking accounts of Radio-Television Caraïbes and a number of well-known public figures in Haiti.

Founder of the online media Hebdo24, launched on 24 February 2021 and "Cabe Solutions". According to Phanord, "technology is a very important tool to a country's development, even the most important nowadays".

In 2019, the media Juno7 designates him as a personality who has marked the digital sector in Haiti.
