= Quisqueya University =

Private university in Haiti

Coordinates: 18.5262°N 72.3218°W

- Université Quisqueya
- Type: Private university
- Established: 1988; 38 years ago
- Rector: Jacky Lumarque
- Location: 218, Av. Jean Paul 2, Haut Turgeau,, Port-au-Prince, Haiti
- Website: uniq.edu.ht

Quisqueya University (French: Université Quisqueya), founded in 1988, is a private Haitian university located in Port-au-Prince. The coordinator of the university's establishment and its first rector, from 1990 to 1995, was Jacques-Édouard Alexis who became Prime Minister of Haiti in 1999. The institution is considered to be Haiti's leading private university.

== Etymology ==
"Quisqueya" (from Quizqueia), meaning "great thing" or "big land", is one of the former names of the island of Hispaniola; the island of Hispaniola comprises Haiti and the Dominican Republic.

== Description ==
The non-profit privately funded institution of higher learning and research is free of political and religious affiliations. Its Latin motto "Hominis beneficio cognoscere et agere" can be translated "Knowledge and action at the service of mankind". The university comprises six major areas of study: Agriculture and Environment, Management and Economics, Engineering and Architecture, Law and Political Science, Education, and Health Sciences, offering bachelor's, master's, and Ph.D. degrees. In particular, it promotes entrepreneurship and economic development.

Despite the effects of the earthquake in 2010 when the number of students dropped to 721, by 2015 enrollment had grown to a record 3,500, served by a teaching staff of around 360. Since 1993, the university has been governed by the Educat-uniQ Foundation which ensures its funding and evolving aspirations. The institution has succeeded in overcoming all the political and natural disasters with which it has been confronted, gaining a reputation as Haiti's leading private university.

== Notable alumni ==
- Jovenel Moïse – Former President of Haiti (2017–2021)
- Martine Moïse – Former first lady of Haiti
- Fincy Pierre – Founder of Balistrad
- Vanessa Dalzon – Editor-in-chief of Balistrad

== Silver jubilee ==
On 17 November 2015, the university's rector, Jacky Lumarque, spoke of achievements over the past 25 years, mentioning that the Centre for Entrepreneurship and Innovation (CEI) had created 200 enterprises, and had trained over 600 business consultants and entrepreneurs. Founded in 2011, CEI had initially been supported by the Clinton Bush Haiti Fund.
