= Elsie Etheart =

Haitian journalist

Elsie Etheart (born c. 1943) is a Haitian journalist known for founding the newspaper Haïti en Marche.

Etheart was born in Haiti in the early 1940s. She had initially planned to become a doctor but instead studied journalism in Germany. While there, she worked for Voice of Germany in Cologne.

She then returned to Haiti, where the news environment was opening slightly after the death of dictator François Duvalier She spent ten years reporting for Radio Métropole in Port-au-Prince.

In 1980, Etheart was detained and then expelled by the government of Jean-Claude Duvalier along with many of her journalist colleagues. She settled in Miami and continued her work as a journalist there. Beginning in 1982, she and her longtime collaborator Marcus Garcia broadcast the news show "Chita Tande" in Haitian Creole on WLRN-FM. Also with Garcia, in 1986, she co-founded the newspaper Haïti en Marche, which became a trusted source for members of the Haitian diaspora. Etheart served as co-editor of the publication. Due to this work, she was described as one of the "most trusted Haitian journalists in the diaspora." In 1990, she was awarded a Maria Moors Cabot Prize.

In the late 1990s, Etheart was able to return to Haiti and work as a journalist in Port-au-Prince. While there, she helped establish the station Radio Mélodie.

Until his death in 2024, she was married to the sociologist Emmanuel Bernard Etheart, with whom she had two children.
