= Hebdo24 =

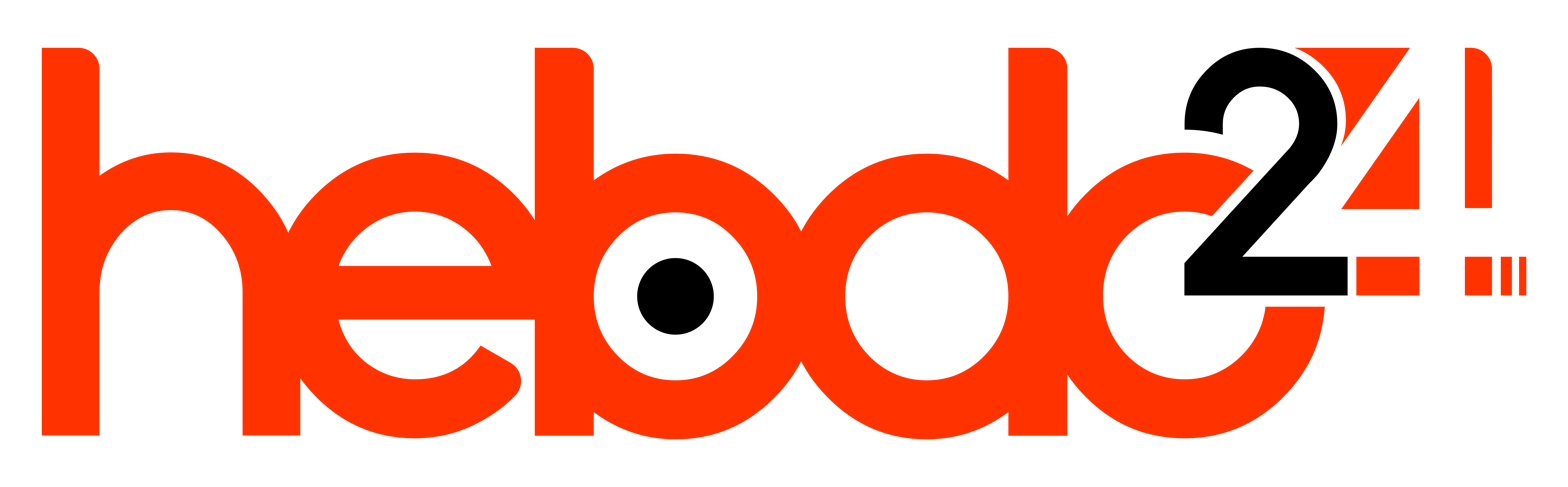
- Categories: News
- Country: Haiti
- Language: French, Haitian Creole, English, Spanish
- Website: http://hebdo24.com

Hebdo24 is a Haitian online-based media launched by Phanord Cabé on February 24, 2021.

Hebdo24 is a general media which aims to be a reference for credible information in Haiti. The information processed by this media is available in four languages: French, English, Spanish and Haitian Creole. The idea behind this project is to further facilitate the accessibility of information through sections such as: culture, society, economy, international, opinions, politics, health, religion and the sport. On the occasion of its first anniversary, its founder notes that the objective is “to inform people and we don't do it for just anything. We disseminate essential information to people, projecting a positive impact on their daily lives.

== History ==
Launched, according to what its founder explains, in a context where online media in Haiti are multiplying and do not offer much, Hebdo24 wanted to offer better among Haitian internet media. Coherence, permanence and seriousness are the key words of Hebdo24. In August 2021, Jean Pierre Étienne joined the editorial staff of this media.

To celebrate its three years of existence, the Hebdo24 team organized a dictation competition in Port-au-Prince · .
