= Radio Télé Ginen =

Radio Tele Ginen
Programming
- Language: French

Links
- Website: rtghaiti.com

Radio Tele Ginen is a politics, sports, and music Haitian radio and television station based in Port-au-Prince.

== See also ==
- Media of Haiti
