= Haitian Press Federation =

The Haitian Press Federation (French: Fédération de la Presse Haïtienne) is a media organisation in Haiti, an umbrella organisation for various Haitian press organisations. Its president is currently Ady Jean-Gardy.
