= Frantz Duval =

Haitian journalist

- Known for: Journalism
- Board member of: Le Nouvelliste

Frantz Duval is a Haitian journalist. Duval is the editor-in-chief of the newspaper Le Nouvelliste, both the largest print media in Haiti and sole daily newspaper; the director of the magazine Ticket Magazine and the radio station Magik 9 (100.9 FM).
