= Vanessa Dalzon =

Former editor-in-chief of Balistrad

- Born: Rhode Vanessa Dalzon; November 1, 1996 (age 29); Port-au-Prince
- Education: Quisqueya University
- Occupation: Journalist
- Years active: 2015–present

Rhode Vanessa Dalzon (born November 1, 1996) is a Haitian journalist and author. She was editor-in-chief of Balistrad.

== Biography ==
Dalzon was born in Port-au-Prince, (Haiti) in a Christian family. She studied Law at Quisqueya University. She is the author of the novel Opération-Rupture, a column published in Balistrad for 22 weeks. Dalzon divides her time away from the office between writing, reading, singing, and television shows.

== See also ==
- List of Haitians
