= Haïti Observateur =

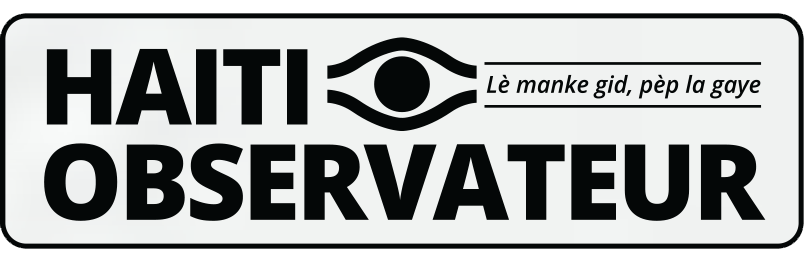
- Type: Weekly newspaper
- Founder(s): Raymond Joseph, Leo Joseph
- Founded: 1971
- Language: French
- Headquarters: 63, Flushing Ave. Unit 277; Brooklyn, New York
- Website: haiti-observateur.net

Haïti Observateur (French pronunciation: [aiti ɔpsɛʁvatœʁ]) is a US-based weekly newspaper founded in 1971 that focuses on news concerning Haiti. It is published in Brooklyn, New York, and has large distribution networks in other locations in the United States, as well in Canada and France. It was the first weekly newspaper for Haitian emigrants. Its main edition is in French, but it also publishes in English and Haitian Creole.

== See also ==
- List of newspapers in New York
- List of newspapers in Haiti
