= Ady Jean-Gardy =

Haitian social reformer (born 1957)

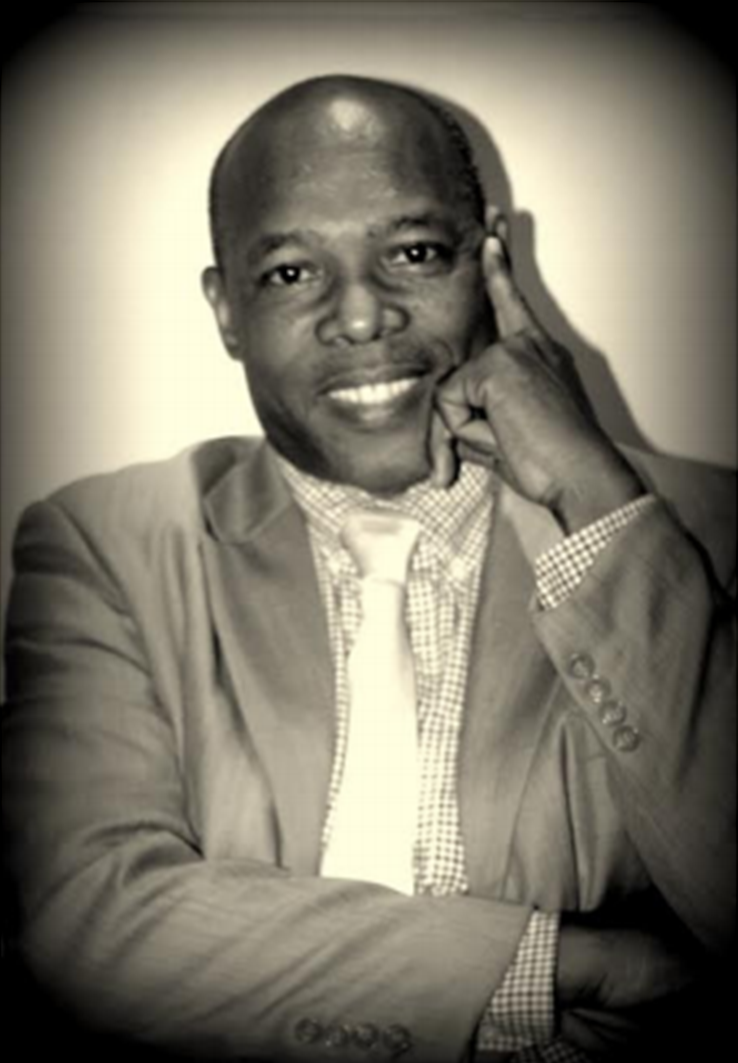
- Ady Jean-Gardy in 2015
- Born: 15 September 1957 (age 64); Port-au-Prince, Haiti

Education
- Education: Universities of Journalism and Social Communication, and Institute of Political Sciences and Economical Sciences

Philosophical work
- Main interests: Social Communication, Ethics, Freedom of Speech, Civil Rights
- Notable ideas: Liberalist, Transcendental idealism

Signature
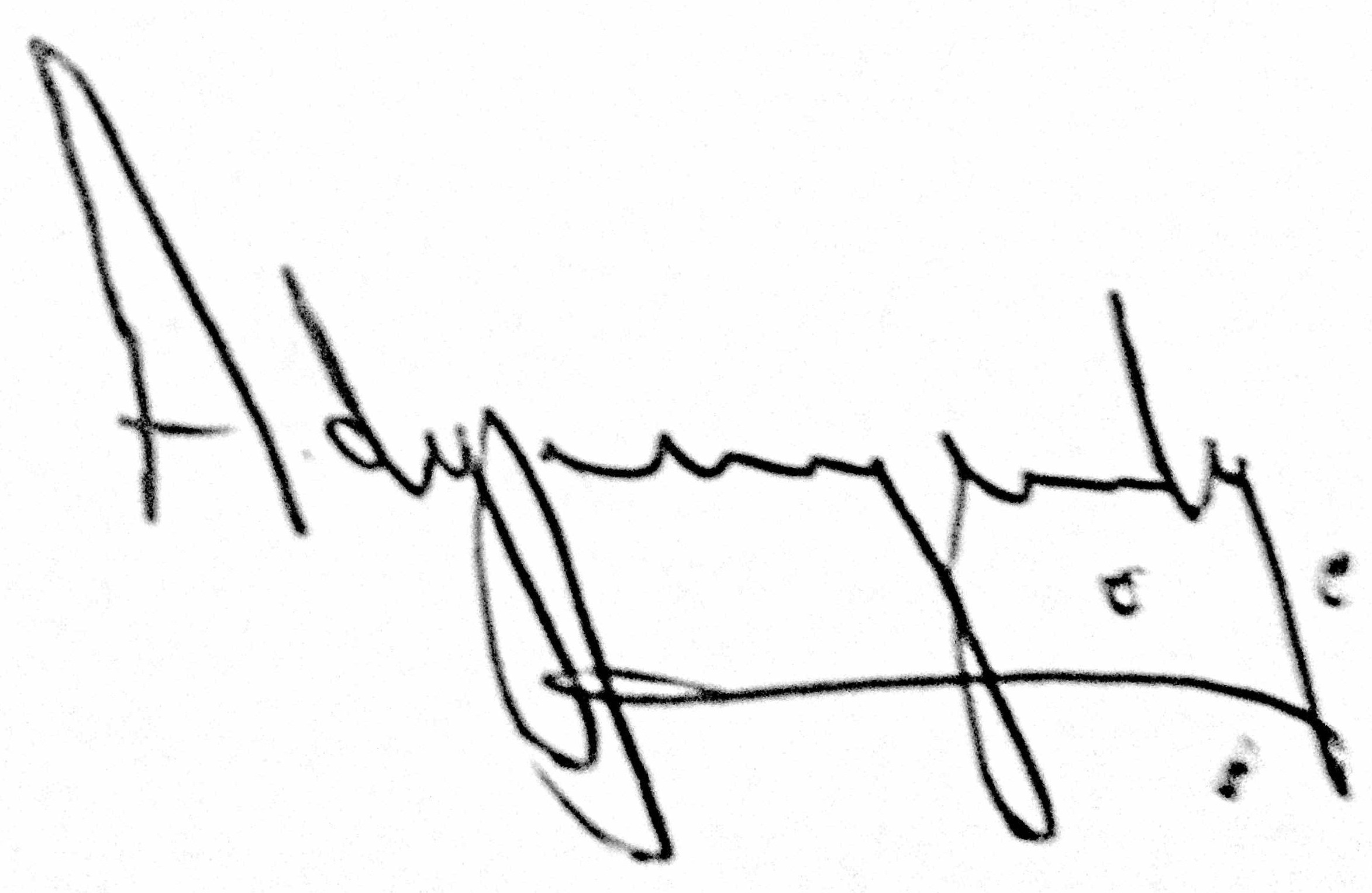

Ady Jean-Gardy (born 15 September 1957) is a Haitian historian, journalist, and former Minister of Communication from 2012 to 2013. His prior experience includes work as a civil servant for the United Nations Development Programme and as a member of the African Union in Addis Ababa, Ethiopia.

== Early life and education ==
Ady Jean-Gardy began his education at the Catholic School of the Salésiens Fathers and later attended Alexander Pétion High School.

After high school, he received a scholarship from President Léopold Sédar Senghor of Senegal, studying communications and journalism in Dakar, Senegal. Upon returning to Haiti at the age of twenty, he was appointed manager of Haiti TV (cable television) under the supervision of Edward B. Hatton.

Jean-Gardy pursued higher education at the Institute of Applied Linguistics in Haiti, studied architecture at the Civil Engineering Institute of Richard Leconte, and earned a bachelor's degree in economics from the Institute of Economic Science and Politics in Haiti. He received a USAID scholarship to study economics, finance, and administrative management at the University of Pittsburgh.

== Career ==
Jean-Gardy served at the United Nations Development Programme and as operations manager of the United Nations Programs from 1989 to 1992.

He was also an associate of the Environmental Programs at the Ministry of Agriculture of Haiti in 1992, operations manager at the Office of UNESCO in 1993, representative of Haiti at the Center for Strategic Studies and Diplomacy in Paris from 1994 to 1997, and operations manager at the Center for Communication Studies of Deutsche Welle in Germany in 1998.

In 1999, he was invited by the U.S. State Department as an international representative of Haiti to the Assembly of Democracy organized by the United Nations in Poland.

As the representative of Haiti to the International Conference of the Inter-American Press Association on Communication Strategies, he expressed his desire for the Haitian State Media (radio and television) to become a community media organization subject to scrutiny by Parliament and press organizations in the country. As president of the International Media Foundation (IMF) in 2006, he produced reports and recommendations for professional development in the media.

In 2001, Jean-Gardy was the president of the Haitian Press Federation. In 2013, he resigned as Minister of Communication. He was succeeded by Régine Godefroy.

== Awards ==
Following his recommendations, the Mayor of Miami-Dade County, Carlos Alvarez, published an official decree recognizing January as the month of Haiti's Independence.

In 2015, Jean-Gardy was awarded the "International Grand Prize of History" by an international cultural association in Bordeaux, France called Arts and Letters of France for his paper titled "Stories of the Arawak Indians of Haiti".
