= Jessica Fièvre =

Haitian-born writer and educator

Michèle-Jessica Fièvre (born April 29, 1981) or sometimes M.J. Fièvre, is a Haitian-born writer and educator who has lived in Florida since 2002.

She was born in Port-au-Prince and was educated there, going on to earn a BEd from Barry University and a MFA in Creative Writing from Florida International University. She self-published her first mystery novel Le Feu de la vengeance at the age of 16. At age 19, she signed her first book contract for a Young Adult novel. Fièvre was editor for the 2012 anthology Ainsi parla la terre / Tè a pale / So Spoke the Earth. She is secretary for Women Writers of Haitian Descent, an organization based in Florida. She has published stories in English and French in several American literary journals. She has worked as a translator and interpreter and taught at a middle school in Davie. Most recently, she has been a professor at Miami Dade College. Fièvre is editor for the literary journal Sliver of Stone.

She is the head of Florida publishing company Lominy Books.

== Selected works ==
- La Bête, novel (1999)
- L’Homme au pardessus jaune, stories (2000)
- Thalassophobie, novel (2001)
- La Statuette maléfique, youth literature (2001)
- Les Hommes en Rouge: l’éclipse, novel (2003)
- La Bête II: Métamorphose, novel (2005)
- Les Fantasmes de Sophie, novel (2007)
- Le Fantôme de Lisbeth, youth literature (2007)
- Sortilège haïtien, novel (2011)
- I am Riding, children's literature (2013), in English, French and Creole
- A Sky the Color of Chaos, memoir (2015)
