= Jean Yves Jason =

Mayor of Port-au-Prince

Muscadin Jean Yves Jason
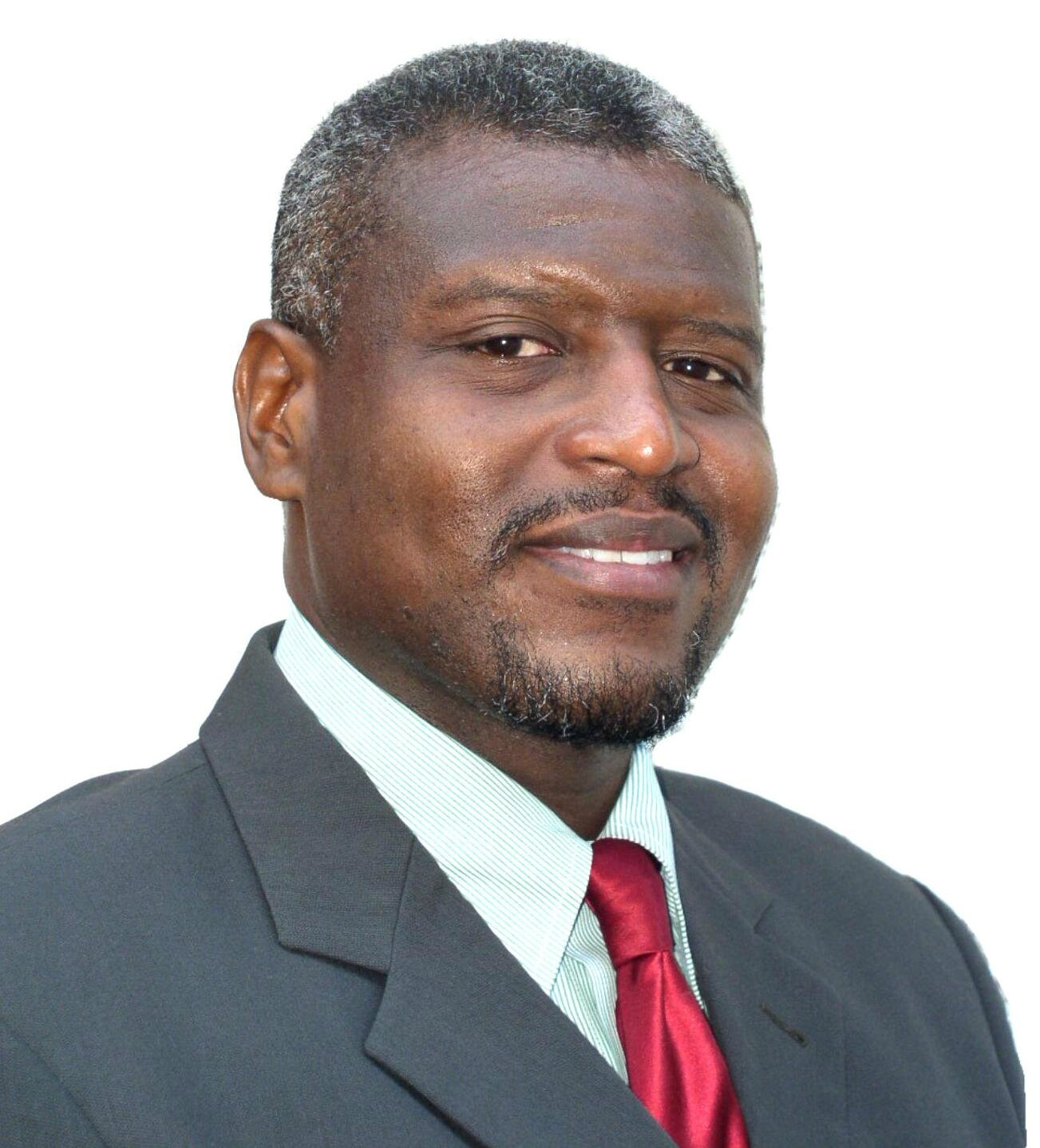
- Official portrait, 2017

Personal details
- Born: Fils Muscadin; May 21, 1964 (age 62) Port-au-Prince, Haiti
- Spouse(s): JASON, Marie Lyndsay, (born FONTILUS)
- Children: 2
- Occupation: Professor, politician

Muscadin Jean Yves Jason (born May 21, 1964) is a Haitian politician and Professor who served as Mayor of Port-au-Prince, the capital of Haiti from 2008 to 2012. Jason was Mayor of Port-au-Prince at the time of the city's destruction during the 2010 Haiti earthquake, which left the City Hall and most of the city government buildings in ruins. A member of Rassemblement des Citoyens Patriotes (RCP), Jason previously served as Head of Cabinet of Manno Charlemagne [city of Port-au-Prince] (June 1995-August 1996)

== Training ==
Jean-Yves Jason has received training in human resource management, as well as in the fields of public administration, finance, anthropology and history. He is a painter, scientific researcher and writer.

== Professional activities ==
Jason has worked in the public and private sectors. He practiced at the National Archives of Haiti, as well as at the Bank of the Haitian Union.

Jean-Yves Jason is also the CEO of Kritik Productions, a company that specializes in the production of major art events and the promotion of Haitian art and crafts.

== Municipal activities ==
Jason served on the Port-au-Prince Municipal Administration as an advisor and consultant to Mayor Paul Evans in 1995 and then as Chief of Staff and Director of Administrative Affairs from 1995 to 1997.

Since his election as mayor of Port-au-Prince in 2007, he has increased exchanges between the capital and many foreign cities as part of decentralized international cooperation: Montreal (Quebec, Canada), Montevideo (Uruguay), Lamentin (Guadeloupe, France), Milan (Italy), Santiago de Cuba, Baton Rouge (Louisiana, United States) and Mexico (Mexico). Other bilateral exchanges will soon be signed with cities such as Barcelona and Zaragoza in Spain.

== The January 2010 earthquake ==
Since the January 2010 earthquake, Jean-Yves Jason has been trying to coordinate and organize aid from around the world. He travels the world to get help rebuilding the Haitian capital. He was received by Abdou Diouf as part of the Francophonie of which Haiti is a member. He was also received by Bertrand Delanoë, mayor of Paris. Jean-Yves Jason was also received by the Secretary of State, Fadela Amara, for a partnership as part of a program to train actors in the Haitian capital in urban, social and economic mastery. He also wants to complete the reconstruction of the historic building of the City Hall completely destroyed, to which will be added large modern buildings (source: official website of the City of Port-au-Prince).

== Dismissal by President Martelly ==
As Jean-Yves Jason's term has come to an end, and following disagreements with the President of the Republic Michel Martelly, the latter dismisses the mayor and his city council. By an order dated 23 February 2012, he replaced them with a three-member municipal commission chaired by Gabrielle Hyacinthe, assisted in his duties by Jean-Marie Descorbettes and Junior Gérald Estimé.
