= Rémi Trotereau =

French sculptor and painter (1956–2026)

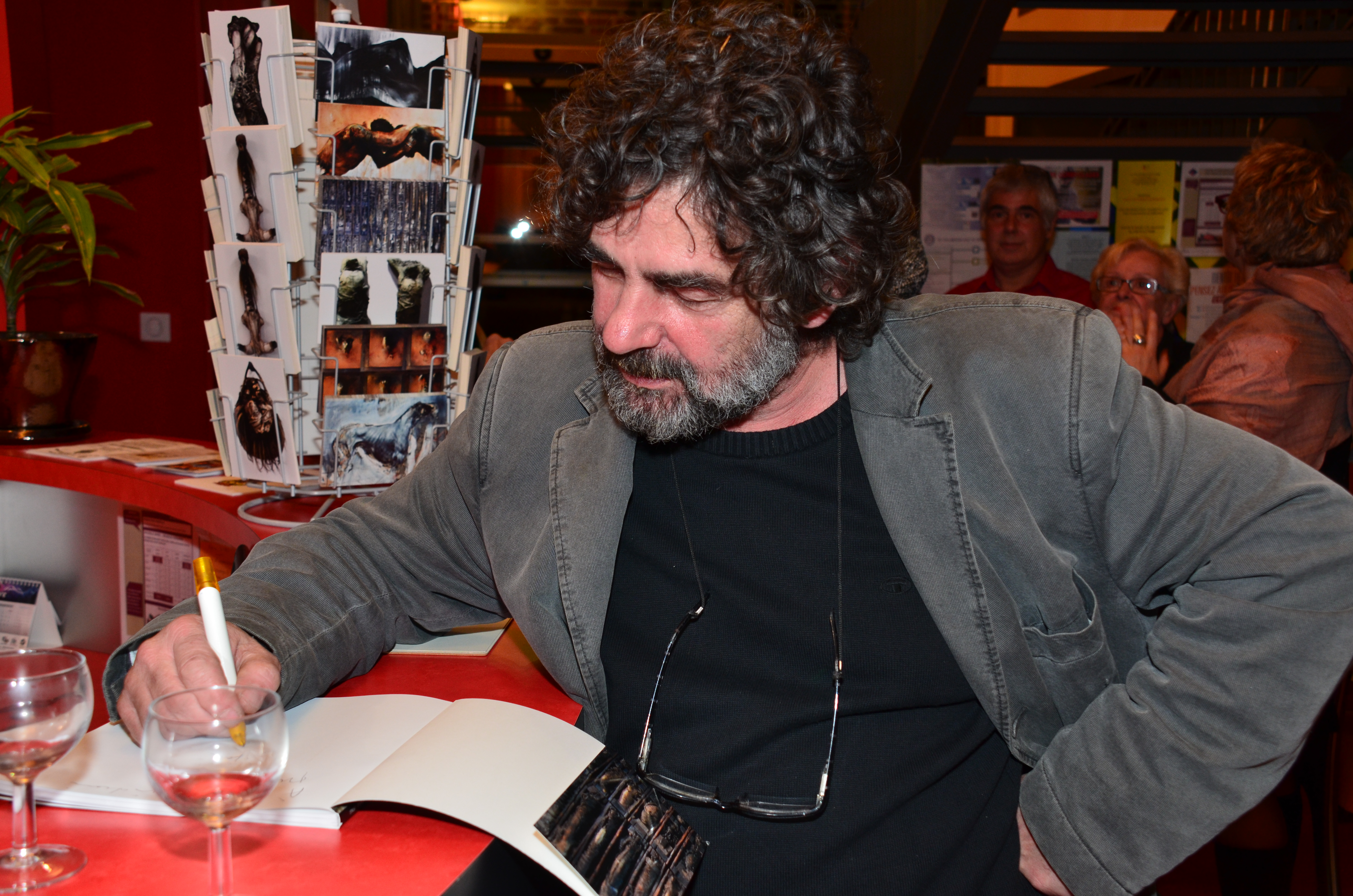
- Trotereau in 2013
- Born: 26 January 1956; Vierzon, France
- Died: 23 July 2026 (aged 70)
- Occupations: Sculptor; Painter

Rémi Trotereau (French: [ʁemˈi tʁotʁˈo]; 26 January 1956 – 23 July 2026) was a French sculptor and painter.

== Life and career ==
Born in Vierzon on 26 January 1956, Trotereau created art rooted in local Vierzon artisanry. He worked in a ceramics factory in Lamotte-Beuvron from 1976 to 1978 before moving around in the 1980s, finally settling in Layrisse, where he set up his workshop. Following a "tormented" approach to his art, he held an exhibiton and screening in 2012 titled Question de corps, held in Nay. His works were conserved in museums such as the Musée des Beaux-Arts de Pau, the Musée Massey, the Musée des Beaux-Arts de Carcassonne, and the Musée Ingres Bourdelle. He also held exhibitions in Shanghai, New York City, and Tarbes. In 2023, the monography Rémi Trotereau, la fièvre des origines was published.

Trotereau died on 23 July 2026, at the age of 70.
