= Radio Kiskeya =

Radio Kiskeya FM
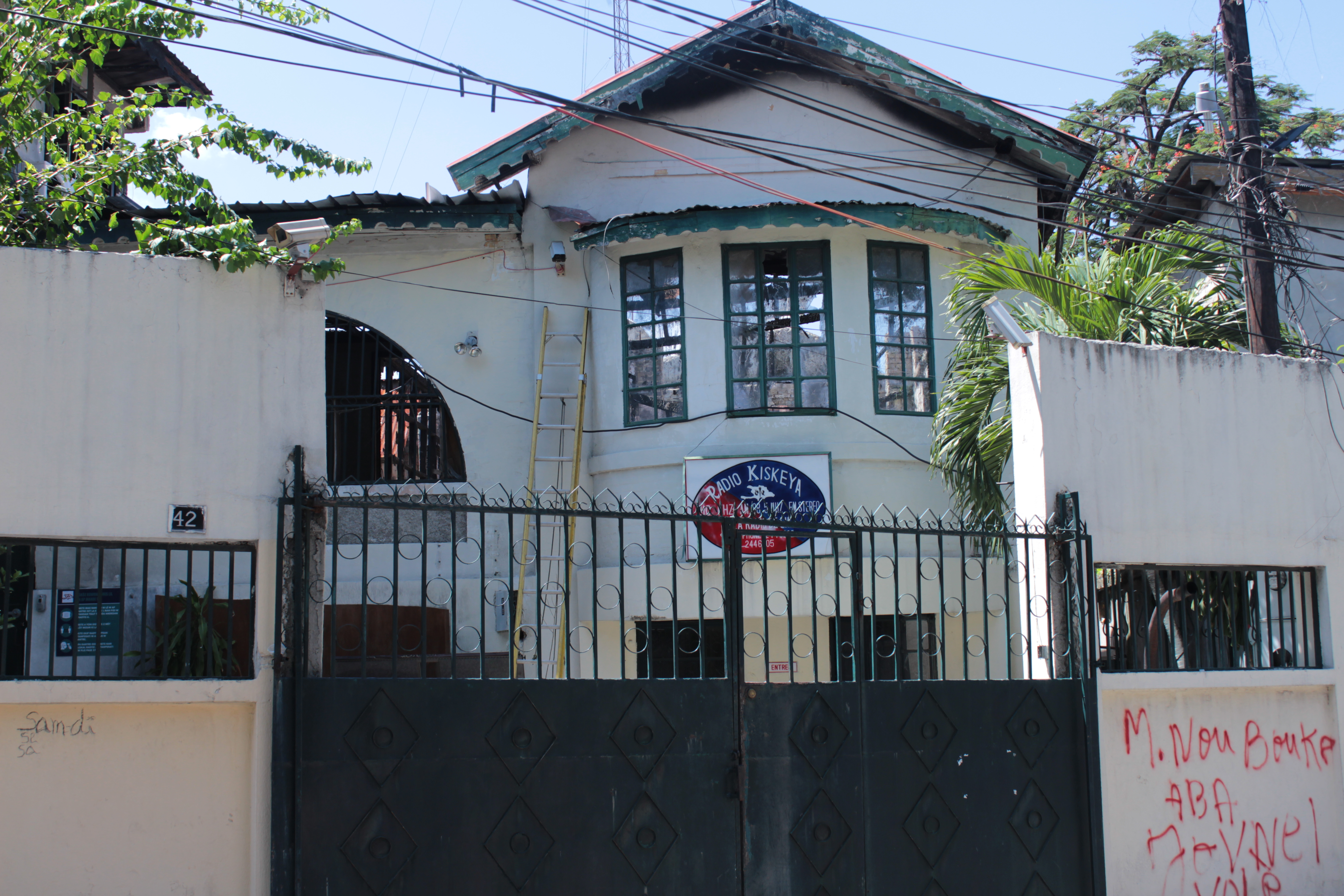
- Port-au-Prince, Haiti; Haiti
- Frequency: 87.5 MHz

Programming
- Language: French

Links
- Website: radiokiskeya.com

Radio Kiskeya is a radio station in Port-au-Prince, Haiti that broadcasts music, talk shows, sports, news, and cultural programs. Its news covers both Haiti and the international community, and its music spans on compas, jazz, tubes, and others.

== See also ==
- Media of Haiti
