= Haïti Progrès =

- Type: Weekly newspaper
- Founded: 1983
- Language: French
- Headquarters: 61, Street Capois; Port-au-Prince, Haiti
- Website: haitiprogres.com

Haïti Progrès (French pronunciation: [aiti pʁɔɡʁɛ]) is a US-based weekly newspaper founded in 1983 that focuses on news concerning Haiti. It is published in Brooklyn, New York, and has offices in Port-au-Prince. Its main edition is in French, but it also publishes in English and Haitian Creole.

== Politics ==
Editorially, Haïti Progrès follows a generally progressive perspective.

== See also ==
- List of newspapers in New York
- List of newspapers in Haiti
