= Balistrad =

Haitian online newspaper

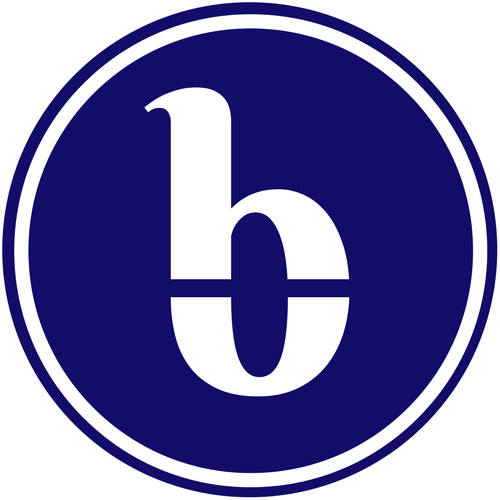

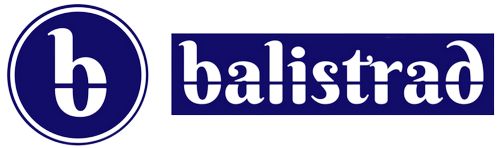
- Balistrad website logo
- Type: Online newspaper
- Format: Online; Website; Electronic publishing
- Owner(s): Balistrad Group; Fincy Pierre
- Founder: Fincy Pierre
- Publisher: Alain Délisca; Balistrad editorial staff
- Editor-in-chief: Vanessa Dalzon
- Editor: Fincy Pierre
- Founded: 11 February 2018; 8 years ago
- Political alignment: Centre-left
- Language: French; Haitian Creole
- Headquarters: Port-au-Prince; Haiti
- Country: Haiti
- Circulation: Nationally (Haiti) and internationally
- Website: balistrad.com

Balistrad is a Haitian online newspaper founded in 2018 by Fincy Pierre. Balistrad is published in French and Haitian Creole. Balistrad is an independent media company producing content for the web.

== Overview ==
Balistrad consists of two main sections: "Le Journal", run by professional journalists, and "Le Blog".

Balistrad appeared for the first time 9 March 2018.

== People ==
=== Executives ===
- Fincy Pierre — Founder, Executive
- Alain Délisca — Executive director
- Vanessa Dalzon — Editor-in-chief, Executive

== See also ==
- List of newspapers in Haiti
- Media of Haiti
