= Signal FM =

- Pétion-Ville, Haiti; Haiti
- Frequency: 90.5 MHz

Programming
- Language: French

Links
- Website: signalfmhaiti.com

Signal FM is a Haitian French language radio station based in the Port-au-Prince suburb of Pétion-Ville. It is a popular station, providing news updates and other information on Haiti. Mario Viau is owner and general manager.

The station remained on the air during the 2010 Haiti earthquake, evolving into a community bulletin board for residents recovering from the damage. For its efforts, the station was awarded the 2010 Maria Moors Cabot prize of Columbia University, the oldest international award for journalism.

== See also ==
- Mass media in Haiti
