= Radio Vision 2000 =

Port-au-Prince, Haiti; Haiti
- Frequency: 99.3 MHz

Programming
- Language: French

Links
- Website: radiotelevision2000.com

Radio Vision 2000 is a radio station in Port-au-Prince, Haiti that broadcasts sports and national news, along with music. It is one of the most popular radio stations in Haiti.

On June 29, 2021, Diego Charles, a journalist for Radio Vision 2000, was shot and killed in Port-au-Prince along with activist Antoinette Duclaire.

== See also ==
- Media of Haiti
