= Le Matin (Haiti) =

Haitian daily newspaper

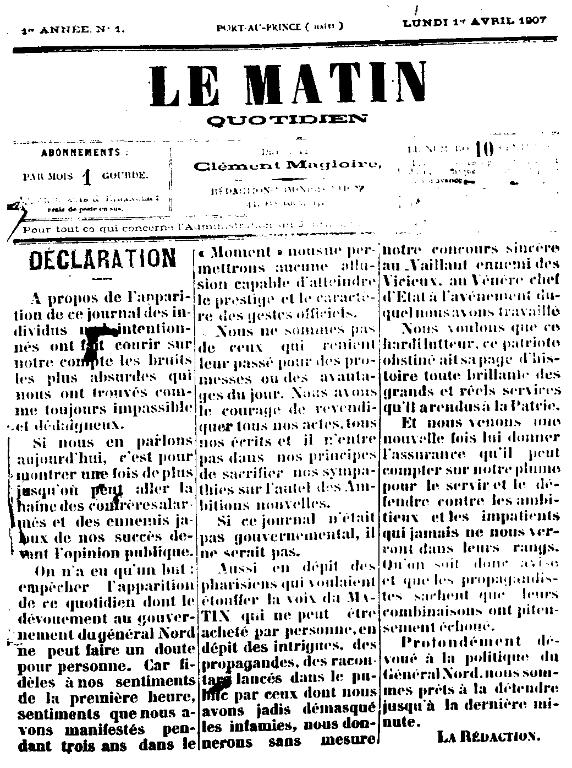
- Le Matin first issue, 1 April 1907
- Type: Daily newspaper
- Owner(s): Le Nouveau Matin, S.A.
- Founder(s): Clément Magloire
- Founded: April 1, 1907
- Language: French
- Headquarters: 3, rue Goulard; Pétion-Ville, Haiti
- Website: lematin.ht

Le Matin (French pronunciation: [lə matɛ̃], The Morning) is a daily newspaper published in Haiti. It was founded on April 1, 1907, by Clément Magloire.

After a two-year absence, the newspaper returned in circulation at the beginning of April 2004 under its current ownership.

== See also ==
- List of newspapers in Haiti
- Media of Haiti
