= Radio Caraïbes =

- Port-au-Prince, Haiti; Haiti
- Frequency: 94.5 MHz

Programming
- Language: French

Links
- Website: radiotelecaraibes.com

Radio Caraïbes is a radio station founded in 1949 by the Brown family that broadcasts live from Port-au-Prince, Haiti. As of 2015 it was run by Wilson Monk. Caraïbes FM hosts the most popular talk show on the island called Ranmase, rebroadcast from a handful of radio station from Miami to Montreal and Paris. Former journalists include Jean-Jahkob Jeudy, Directeur de programmation et affaires publiques de Radio Cacique d'Haïti; Louinel Saintalbord; Carlo Sainristil; and Jean-Samuel Trezil.

== See also ==
- Media of Haiti
