= Radio Métropole =

Port-au-Prince; Haiti
- Frequency: 100.1 MHz

Programming
- Language: French

Ownership
- Owner: Wibs, S.A.

History
- First air date: March 8, 1970

Links
- Webcast: Radio Métropole Live
- Website: metropolehaiti.com

Radio Métropole is a Haitian French language private radio station based in Port-au-Prince. It is a popular station, providing news updates and other information on Haiti.

== History ==
Radio Métropole was founded on March 8, 1970 by Herbert Widmaier. A pioneer in Haitian radio, it was the first to broadcast in FM since 1970 as well as the first station to broadcast in Stereo in 1975 and to play music on CDs in 1980.

== See also ==
- Media of Haiti
