= Le Nouvelliste (Haiti) =

French-language daily newspaper in Haiti

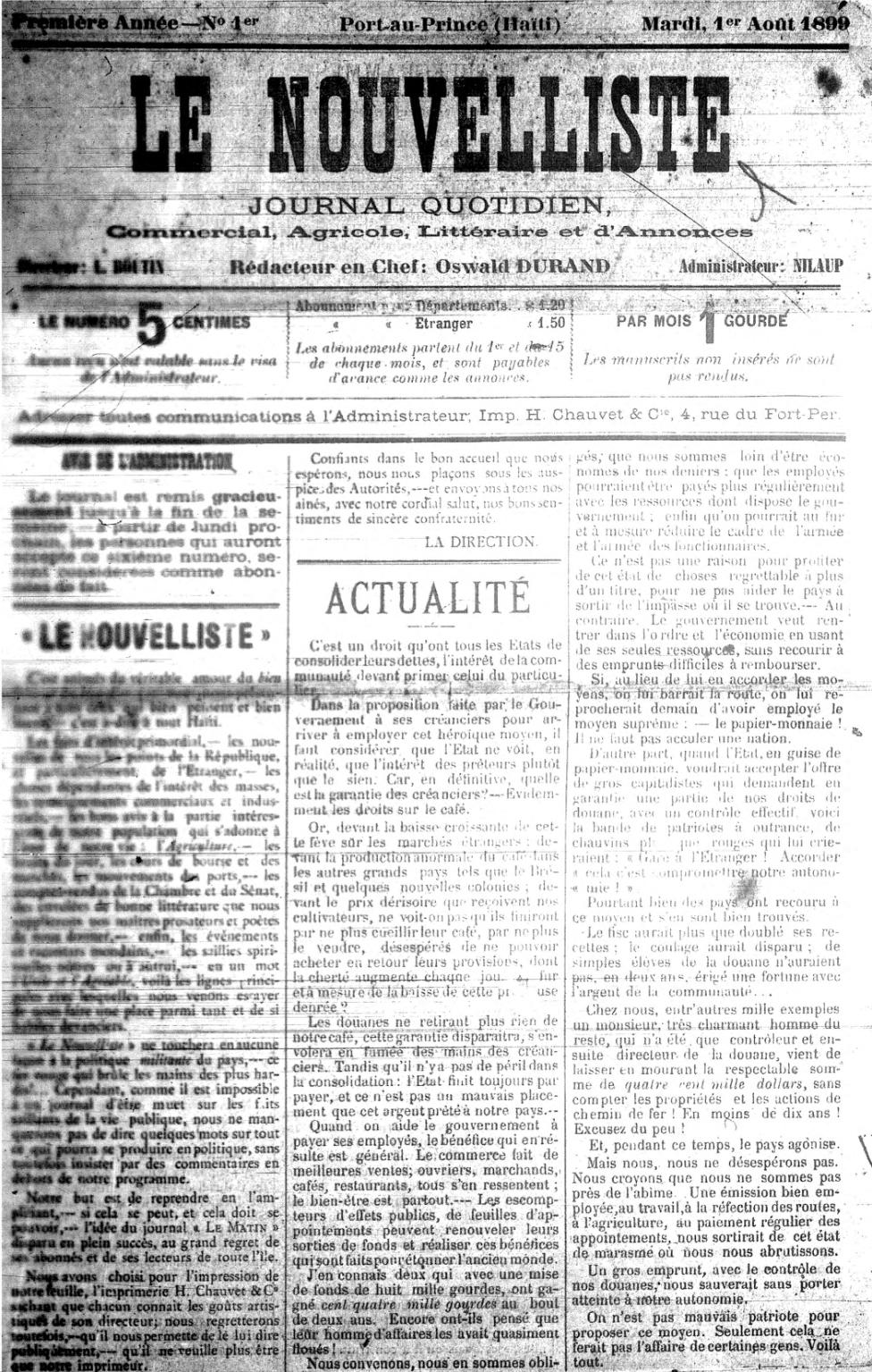
- First issue of Le Nouvelliste, 1 August 1899.
- Type: Daily newspaper
- Founder: Guillaume Chéraquit
- Editor-in-chief: Frantz Duval
- Founded: May 2, 1898
- Language: French
- Headquarters: 198, rue du Centre; Port-au-Prince, Haiti
- Circulation: 18,000
- Website: lenouvelliste.com

Le Nouvelliste (French pronunciation: [lə nuvɛlist]) is a French-language daily newspaper printed in Port-au-Prince, Haiti, and distributed throughout the country, particularly the capital and 18 of the country's major cities.

The paper was founded in 1898 by Guillaume Chéraquit originally under the name Le Matin, to become Le Nouvelliste 15 months later. Printing was entrusted to Chéraquit's friend Henri Chauvet. Today, Le Nouvelliste is Haiti's oldest and largest daily newspaper.

The first issue of Le Nouvelliste was published on 1 August 1899. It consisted of four pages and three columns. Its subtitle read: Journal Quotidien, Commercial, Agricole, Littéraire et d’Annonces (fr. Daily Newspaper, Commerce, Agriculture, Literature, and Advertisements). In the opening article, the editorial team pledged to deliver information without adding commentary. By December 1899, illustrations began to appear in the paper. After its first decade, the newspaper had a circulation of 18,000 copies and approximately 50,000 readers.

Le Nouvelliste gained a reputation as a reliable and independent source of information. It covers topics such as politics, economics, culture, education, and sports. In addition to providing news, the publication serves as a platform for public debate and intellectual exchange, fostering the country's development. Its commitment to editorial independence has often come at a cost, including persecution, censorship, and acts of violence against its journalists.

In April 2024, Le Nouvelliste announced that unidentified individuals had vandalized its premises in downtown Port-au-Prince. Max Chauvet, the newspaper owner, announced that there would be no print publication for a while, and that Le Nouvelliste would only be available online.

== See also ==
- List of newspapers in Haiti
- Media of Haiti
