= Haïti en Marche =

- Type: Weekly newspaper
- Founder(s): Elsie Ethéart, Marcus Garcia.
- Founded: 1986
- Language: French
- Headquarters: 100 Avenue Lamartinière; Port-au-Prince, Haiti
- Website: haitienmarche.com

Haïti en Marche (French pronunciation: [aiti ɑ̃ maʁʃ], transl. Haiti on the March) is a weekly newspaper published in Haiti. It was founded in Miami, Florida in 1986 by Elsie Ethéart and Marcus Garcia.
