= Haitian literature =

Haitian literature has been closely intertwined with the political life of Haiti. Haitian intellectuals turned to African traditions, France, Latin America, the UK, and the United States, successively or simultaneously. At the same time, Haitian history has always been a rich source of inspiration for literature, with its heroes, its upheavals, its cruelties and its rites.

== The nineteenth century ==
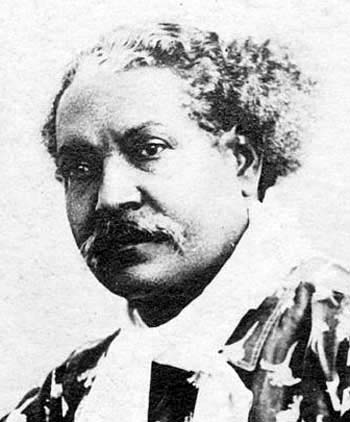
Oswald Durand (1840–1906)

In the eighteenth century, settlers in France published descriptive and political works. Haitian literature has its origins in the country's independence.

In 1804, Fligneau's play The Haitian expatriate premiered. But the ruling classes and the intellectual elites in the emerging Haitian state remain imbued with French culture. There was a patriotic vein that recounted the deeds of convulsive independence. It adopted, over the 19th century, the successive literary currents coming from France: classicism, romanticism, Parnassianism, and symbolism. Major authors of this period include Antoine Dupré (1782–1816), Juste Chanlatte (1766–1828), François Romain Lhérisson (1798–1859) and Jules Solime Milscent (1778–1842), who founded the journal L'abeille haytienne in 1817.

In this period of intense literary turmoil, newspapers like Le Républicain and later L'Union opened their pages to the first romantics. L'Observateur, created in 1819, published romantic poetry. In 1836 the group of the Cénacle was formed, with the romantic poets Ignace Nau (1808–1845) and Coriolan Ardouin (1812–1838). Later Oswald Durand (1840–1906) and Massillon Coicou (1867–1908) represented this movement.

Theatrical production was equally rich and vital, parallel to the emergence of melodrama in France. All genres were represented: prose drama, tragedy, comedy, and works reflecting current and changing mores.

At the end of the 19th century, Haitian literature was imbued with the prestige of the French language and almost exclusively oriented towards Paris. Touching only the literate francophone minority, it ignored Haitians' daily lives, despite a strong patriotic dimension.

== The twentieth century ==
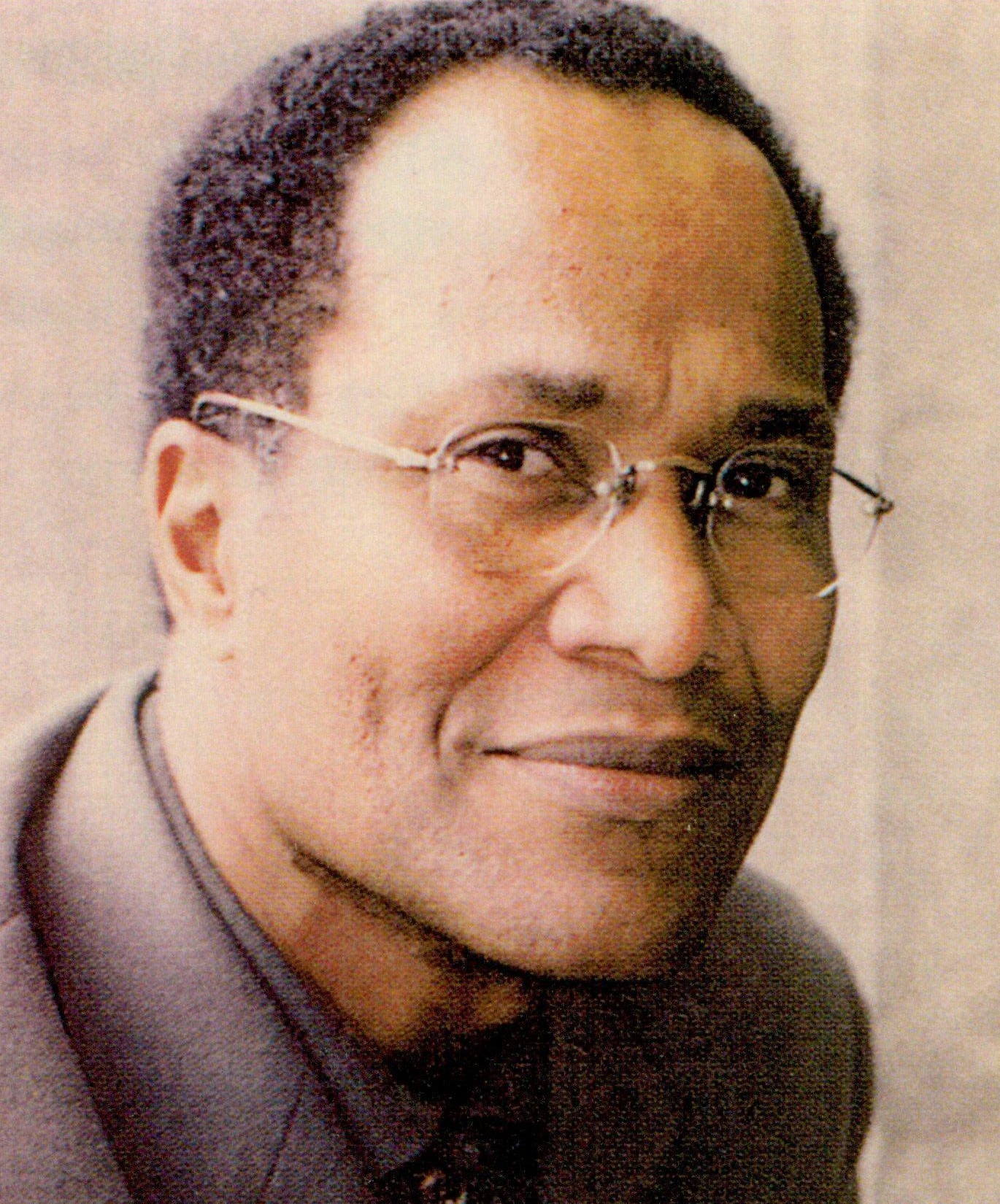
Maximilien Laroche (1937–2017)

The twentieth century opened with the creation of the magazine La Ronde by Pétion Gérome in 1895. The poets in this intimate and delicate school (Etzer Vilaire, Georges Sylvain) continued to use France as a point of reference. This vein continued during the first part of the 20th century with poets such as Dantès Bellegarde and Ida Faubert.

The American occupation, starting in 1915, was a shock. The génération de la gifle (slap generation) created successive militant literary magazines: La Revue de la ligue de la jeunesse haïtienne (1916), La Nouvelle Ronde (1925), and above all La Revue indigène (1927). The Indigeniste movement, through its founder Jean Price-Mars invited writers to start creating rather than imitating, that is to draw from the African roots of the Haitian people. The resistance was also expressed in the oral culture, stories, traditions, and legends.

At the same time, social realism in literature was advanced by Jacques Roumain (Gouverneurs de la rosée, 1944) and René Depestre. The novel depicted the darkness of peasant life in the country. Stephen Alexis, René Depestre, and Gérald Bloncourt founded the magazine La Ruche in 1945.

In 1946, André Breton was appointed by the Director of Cultural Affairs in Paris to establish relations with Haitian intellectuals.

In the midst of a student strike opposing the Lescot government, their speeches resonated with the insurgents, particularly those led by René Depestre. However, the surrealist influence on Haitian literature remained small, though honest. It is, for example, openly claimed by Clément Magloire-Saint-Aude, collaborator of Griots.

The réalisme merveilleux of René Depestre and Jacques Stephen Alexis in the 1950s had a larger following. Contemporary Haitian literature is part of the Francophone literature as well as the Latin American culture.

== Haitian diaspora ==
The Duvalier regime saw the exodus of many Haitian intellectuals. The so-called writers of the diaspora engaged in a militant literature, treating Haiti in terms of memory, suffering, and guilt of being far from one's land. Books such as Jean Métellus's Louis Vortex (1992, réédition 2005) depict the daily life of Haitian exiles in their host countries.

From the Duvalier dictatorship to the beginning of the third millennium, titles from that period paraded themes of madness or possession, misery, and violence, culminating in feelings of helplessness, bitterness, and dispersal. Haitian writers forced into exile during the second half of the twentieth century included Renè Depestre, Dany Laferrière, Jacques-Stephen Alexis, Marie Vieux-Chauvet, and others. They are part of the indigenism movement that advocated re-appropriating the culture from the changes that the American occupation and Duvalier's dictatorship had brought about.

By that time, the dictatorship had passed from Papa Doc to his son, Baby Doc. An exploitative sweatshop system had been established, and the Haitian government had started sending its own citizens, like slaves, to work in sugar plantations in the Dominican Republic. Edwidge Danticat explains this in her introduction to Chauvet's Love, Anger, Madness. Writers and intellectuals had begun leaving the country in throngs.

== Some contemporary authors ==
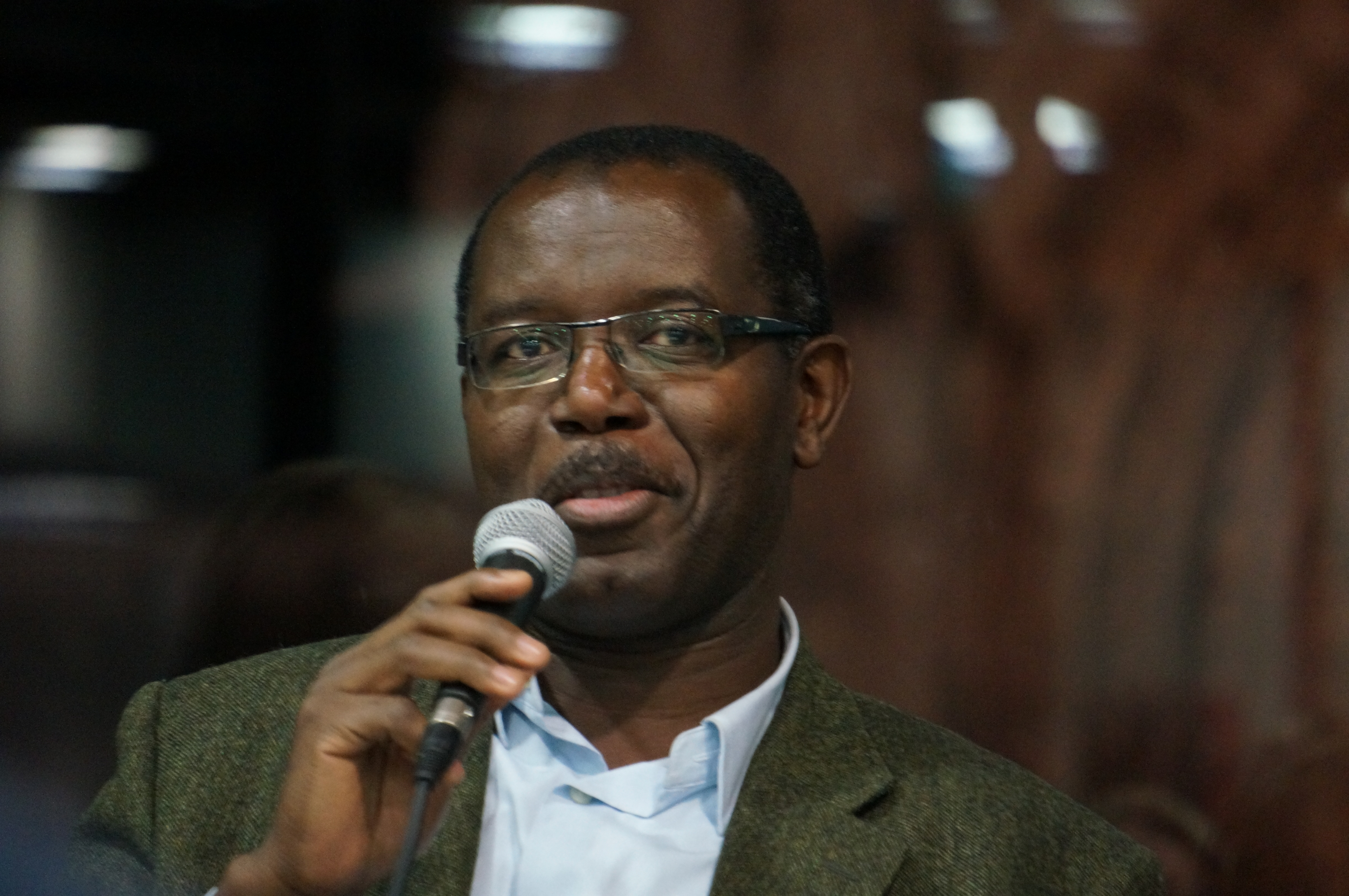
Louis-Philippe Dalembert (b. 1962)

Living in Haiti:

- Frankétienne (1936 - 2025)
- Lyonel Trouillot (1956 -)
- Gary Victor (1958 -)

Living in the US or Canada:

- Anthony Phelps (1928 -)
- Émile Ollivier (1940–2002)
- Maximilien Laroche (1937–2017)
- Gary Klang (1940 -)
- Josaphat-Robert Large (1942 -)
- Joel Des Rosiers (1951 -)
- Dany Laferrière (1953 -)
- Marie-Célie Agnant
- Stanley Péan (1966 -)
- Edwidge Danticat (1969 -)
- Fred Edson Lafortune (1982 -)
- Fabrice Guerrier (1991 -)
- Lenelle Moise (1980 -)
- Jonel Juste (1980 -)

Living in France:

- René Depestre (1926 -)
- Jean Métellus (1937 -)
- Jean-Claude Charles (1949–2008)
- Louis-Philippe Dalembert (1962–)
- Dimitry Elias Léger (1971 -)
- Jean D'Amérique (1994 -)

== The language issue ==
There are many hypotheses on the origins of Haitian Creole. Linguist John Singler suggests that it most likely emerged under French control in colonial years, when its economy focused heavily on sugar production. This resulted in a much larger enslaved African population, whose interactions with the French created the conditions for the dialect to evolve from a pidgin to a Creole. His research and the research of Claire Lefebvre of the Université du Québec à Montréal suggest that Creole, despite drawing 90% of its lexicon from French, is the syntactic cousin of Fon, a Gbe language of the Niger-Congo family spoken in Benin. At the time of the emergence of Haitian Creole, 50% of the enslaved Africans in Haiti were Gbe speakers.

In any event, there are more than 200 Creole or Creole-related languages. Whether based on English, Portuguese, Spanish, Dutch, or French, as in Haiti, Creole is the language of collective memory, carrying a symbol of resistance. Creole is found in stories, songs, poetry (Saint-John Perse, Aimé Césaire, Derek Walcott), and novels (Patrick Chamoiseau, Raphaël Confiant).

Despite Haiti's independence, French has remained the country's official language. French, a language of great cultural prestige, was spoken by the elite, and creole did not enter the literary field until the second half of the 20th century. Although the vast majority of the island's population spoke Haitian Creole, their signage and educational institutions use only French, a remnant of the occupation. Only in 1969 did Creole become the official language of Haiti alongside French. The indianists of the 1930s and the Négritude movement (incarnated in Haiti by Jean Price-Mars) emphasized the African origins of Antillean people, giving it an identity lost in deportation and later colonization. But, for them, Creole was still considered an impure language of slavery.

The Créolité movement, which succeeded indianists and the Négritude movement, rehabilitated the Creole, which no longer was only the language of slavery, but "that which we made together to survive". A shift was brought about in Haitian literature, from French to Creole, or du français vers le créole, or rather a dialogue between the two languages.

Creole is used frequently in poetry and drama. Frankétienne, for example, writes his plays only in Creole. An oral language, Creole is particularly suited in these genres elevating the voice. (Even if many Haitians speak and understand Creole, not all can read it.) In novels, the two languages are sometimes used together, creating a new and original way of writing.

The choice of language for writing is an important issue in contemporary creative writing, especially for writers residing in Haiti.

== Comparative studies of Haitian literature ==
The Haitian great essay writer Maximilien Laroche has made in-depth analysis of Haitian literature, and of its influence around the world. He compared major Haitian literary works with others from the Caribbean, France, Québec, Africa, South-America and Brazil, in particular.

== See also ==
- Francophone literature
- French literature
- Media of Haiti
- Maximilien Laroche
