= Dédée Bazile =

Haitian revolutionary and vivandière (1736–1816)

- Born: c. 1736; Cap-Français, Saint-Domingue
- Died: c. 1816; Port-au-Prince, Haiti
- Known for: Gathering the remains of Jean-Jacques Dessalines for burial
- Children: 6

Dédée Bazile (c. 1736 – c. 1816), also known as Défilée or Défilée-la-folle (Défilée the Madwoman), was a Haitian revolutionary and vivandière best known for gathering the remains of Emperor Jean-Jacques Dessalines for burial. Born in Cap-Francais, the then-capital of the French colony of Saint-Domingue, she had six children as a result of rape by her enslaver. In 1796, during the Haitian Revolution, Bazile joined the Army of Saint-Domingue as a vivandière, marching with soldiers and selling provisions to them. Historical accounts claim she exhibited madness, usually attributed to the killing of her parents, brothers, or sons by French troops during the Saint-Domingue expedition, although this characterization has been contested.

Dessalines proclaimed Saint-Domingue's independence as the First Empire of Haiti in 1804 then became emperor, but his dictatorship was unpopular. Two years later, he was assassinated by soldiers, and his body was stoned by crowds in Port-au-Prince. Défilée eventually gathered his remains for burial, although historical accounts differ on whether she carried them to a cemetery. Historians have interpreted her gathering of the remains as either a Vodou priestess ritual to prevent Dessalines from resurrecting or as an anti-colonial gesture. She lived in poverty until her death.

Défilée is prominent in Haitian legend, folklore, and literature. She was initially remembered in a Haitian folklore song, then became a symbol of Haiti's national identity among early 20th-century Haitian writers. Writers and historians radicalized by the United States occupation of Haiti portrayed Défilée as a maternal symbol of resistance. From the late 20th century, she has been depicted in works by women authors in the Haitian diaspora.

== Early life and military career ==
Dédée Bazile was born c. 1736 in Cap-Français, the then-capital of the French colony of Saint-Domingue. She was born into slavery by enslaved parents and at the age of 18 began to raped and tortured by her enslaver, a white colonist of French descent. This resulted in Bazile giving birth to three daughters, Agate Jean, Victorian Jean, and Annesthine, and three sons. In 1796, during the Haitian Revolution, Bazile began associating with the Army of Saint-Domingue as a vivandière managing a canteen. She sold provisions such as meats to soldiers and frequently marched with them. When they halted, she often ordered them to continue, shouting, "Défilez, défilez" ("March, march"). Bazile was accordingly nicknamed Défilée.

Multiple historical accounts claim that Défilée exhibited madness, hence the later nickname Défilée-la-folle (Défilée the Madwoman). She was homeless and publicly spoke to invisible beings, which the historian Nathalie Pierre has said were possibly lwa spirits of Haitian Vodou. Ertha Pascal-Trouillot, a Haitian scholar of law and women's rights who later became president, asserted that her madness led her to offer sex to soldiers and develop a "wild passion" for Jean-Jacques Dessalines, then an officer in the Army of Saint-Domingue. The mid-19th century Haitian storyteller Joseph Jérémie associated Défilée's madness with her relentlessness in battle: "In her madness she had set herself the task of giving the enemy no rest ... But Défilée could not conceive of existence without a battle, without an ambush on the winding path."

Historical accounts attribute Défilée's madness to various causes. Her descendant Didi Coudol asserted that her madness was caused by her enslaver abandoning her for another woman, though the historian Octave Petit rejected this explanation as crude and implausible. Pascal-Trouillot cited the killing of her parents by French troops. An account by Jérémie, quoted by Petit and the historian Jean Fouchard, cited the killing of her relatives. One night, two of her brothers and all three of her sons, all of whom were soldiers, did not return from a party in the Cahos mountains. They were among nearly 600 Black people that had been massacred by French troops under the orders of Donatien de Rochambeau during the Saint-Domingue expedition. The news traumatized Défilée but she continued to work as a vivandière with the same determination. In 1803, she began associating with the rebel Indigenous Army, which had been formed in that year to drive out French forces from Saint-Domingue. Contesting claims that Défilée was mad, the Haitian writer and scholar Louis-Joseph Janvier, who studied at the University of Paris Faculty of Medicine, wrote, "Défilée was not absolutely mad". Rather, he felt that the killing of her brothers and sons led only to a "cerebral disturbance".

== Gathering the remains of Dessalines ==
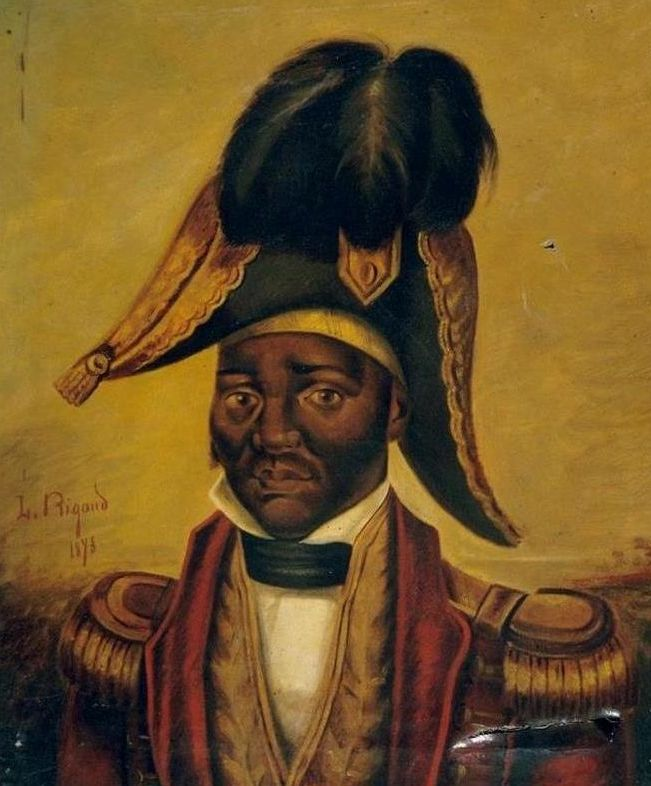
Posthumous portrait of Jean-Jacques Dessalines

French forces were driven out of Saint-Domingue in November 1803, and on 1 January 1804 Dessalines proclaimed Saint-Domingue's independence as the First Empire of Haiti and crowned himself emperor. Dessalines enforced plantation labor to develop the Haitian economy and began ruling as a dictator. He disappointed many of the nouveaux libres—the newly freed 80% of the population—who felt his rule evoked the slavery they had faced before independence. Anciens libres—those who were free before the revolution, often mulattoes—were angered by his plans to reallocate land to the nouveaux. High-ranking military officers also began to object to his command and economic policies. Discontented Haitians began an insurrection in the south in August 1806, which culminated in Dessalines' assassination on October 17. Soldiers ambushed Dessalines in Pont-Rouge under orders from a group of conspirators, including Dessalines's friend Alexandre Pétion. Dessalines was shot, stabbed, stripped, and had his fingers cut off. His corpse was brought to Port-au-Prince, where it was stoned by crowds until the body was said to resemble "scraps" and "shapeless remains".

Multiple modern sources assert that Défilée gathered the remains of Dessalines for burial. Some assert that she also carried the remains to a cemetery, or that she led his burial. The historian Thomas Madiou stated that Défilée was wandering when she found a group of children stoning Dessalines' corpse and shouting joyfully. She asked them who the corpse belonged to, and when they answered, "her wild eyes became calm" and "a glimmer of reason shone on her features". The historian and claimed eyewitness Beaubrun Ardouin, who was ten in 1806, stated that Défilée found Dessalines at noon. She was a madwoman, but in a moment of lucidity and compassion, she lamented alone beside him. The scholar Anténor Firmin believed that Dessalines had laid abandoned in the street for two days before Défilée found him, but the scholar Jana Evans Braziel found this incredulous.

Madiou further stated that Défilée reassembled the remains of Dessalines, gathered them into a sack, and carried them to a cemetery. Pétion later sent soldiers to bury him for a generous sum. Conversely, Ardouin claimed to have met Défilée and rejected Madiou's suggestion that she could have carried him: "Perhaps Madiou did not recall that Dessalines was hefty, weighing perhaps 70 to 80 kilos: how could a rather weak Défilée carry such a weight?" According to Ardouin, Pétion's soldiers had carried Dessalines, and she followed them to the Trousses-Côtés cemetery. The historian Joan Dayan also considered it implausible that Défilée carried his remains alone, but insisted that a madman named Dauphin assisted her. Ardouin further stated that Défilée left Dessalines's funeral ceremony last and, for a while afterwards, returned to his grave to spread flowers. Jérémie added that Défilée composed the earliest elegy to Dessalines and would sing it while kneeling before his grave after kissing it three times.

=== Analysis ===
An embodied, fully immanent ritual—Défilée's gathering of Dessalines's remains—traverses and confounds boundaries dividing body and spirit, state and ritual, death and life, gesturing toward infinity.

— Jana Evans Braziel, Small Axe

Dayan believed that by gathering the remains of Dessalines, Défilée showed concern for proper burial rites and a fear of the undead. She understood Défilée to have acted as a manbo, a Vodou priestess, who intended to prevent Dessalines from resurrecting. Dayan noted that Vodouists were very worried that sorcerers might resurrect human remains that were not buried and use them for harmful magic.

The sociologist Sabine Lamour, who believes Défilée buried the remains of Dessalines, considered the act an anti-colonial gesture. Lamour premised that Défilée's identities as a freedwoman, a poor person, a canteen worker, a bereaved person, and a war survivor each suggested a strong commitment to community or an association with a larger cause. She believed that by burying the remains of Dessalines, Défilée rejected the sociopolitical erasure he would have faced if left desecrated in the street. Lamour considered the burial an attempt to humanize the anti-colonial political system he led a shift towards and discourage Haitians from the colonial practice of bodily desecration. Lamour wrote: "Défilée invites Haitians to renounce the terror and cruelty to which people were accustomed during slavery, and to rebuild the world with a different outlook. The anciens libres and nouveaux libres would need to give up their enmity in order to establish a new society." She added that Défilée continued to visit the grave of Dessalines even as his name was banned across the country, he was deemed a tyrant, and government officials ordered his supporters to be banned from national politics. Lamour has rejected the characterization of Défilée as a madwoman as an attempt to discredit her.

== Later life and death ==
Little is known about Défilée's life after she gathered the remains of Dessalines. She settled in Fort-Saint-Clair, a neighborhood in Port-au-Prince, and lived in poverty on welfare spending. She was found dead along a road around 1816. Joseph Jérémie claimed that Défilée was buried in a city cemetery and that her grave has disappeared.

== Legacy and historiography ==
Historical accounts of Défilée are rare and often nationalist in tone, which has left many gaps and ambiguities in her biography. Nevertheless, she is a source of Haitian legend, folklore, and literature. Historical accounts of her have been repeatedly reinterpreted in oral traditions such as songs, proverbs, and stories. As such, Jana Evans Braziel regards Défilée as a lieu de mémoire, a symbol that has preserved part of Haiti's collective memory. Braziel wrote: "legend flourishes from history, and novels from legends: the figure of Défilée is discerned only in the interwoven threads of history, literature, myth, and folklore."

Défilée was initially remembered in a Haitian folklore song dating to Henri Christophe's rule over northern Haiti or Jean-Pierre Boyer's presidency—two periods characterized by oppression. Haitians sang it to express regret for celebrating the assassination of Dessalines. The lyrics are written from Défilée's perspective and the drama centers on her lament over the unstable political environment. Défilée was later recorded in early Haitian historiographies of the revolution, including Thomas Madiou's 1847 Histoire d'Haïti (History of Haiti) and Beaubrun Ardouin's 1853 Études sur l'histoire d'Haïti (Studies on the History of Haiti). The two books provide brief but useful accounts of her actions after the assassination. However, Joan Dayan and Braziel remark that both reinforce a patriarchal historical record and only invoke Défilée or other women in the Haitian Revolution as an interlude to men's actions.

By the 20th century, writers sought to discuss Dessalines candidly to help find solutions for frequent civil war in the country. In 1904 and 1906, during celebrations of the centennials of Haiti's independence and his assassination, many writers interpreted Défilée as a symbol of Haitian national identity. For example, in the preface to his play L'Empereur Dessalines (The Emperor Dessalines), Massillon Coicou wrote: "Isn't she the most beautiful incarnation of our national consciousness, this madwoman who moved amidst those who were mad but believed themselves sane?" The play premiered in October 1906 and was the first to portray Défilée, who was played by the prominent actress and intellectual Sylvia Innocent. In the play, Défilée weeps over Dessalines's muddy remains then carries them in her dress.

Défilée was embraced from 1915 to 1934 during the United States occupation of Haiti, particularly in Haitian nationalist poetry. Frédéric Burr-Reynaud and Christian Werleigh contributed poems about her to the nationalist literary magazine Stella, published in Haiti from 1926 to 1930. Werleigh's poem Le miracle: Dessalines et Défilée ("The Miracle: Dessalines and Défilée") was more overtly nationalist than Coicou's play. The poem portrays Pétion and those who celebrated the assassination as shortsighted and the impetus for Haiti's collapse. Werleigh contrasts them with Défilée, portrayed as a redemptive and maternal symbol who preserved Dessalines's memory for future revival. In 1931, the historian Octave Petit published a journal article about Défilée, also overtly nationalist. Petit filled in details of her life using oral testimony from her descendants Filius Bazile and Didi Coudol and the storyteller Joseph Jérémie, but lamented that the biography was incomplete. The article portrays her as a symbolic mother of Haiti, a model for Haitian women, and a symbol of resistance relevant under U.S. occupation. Petit declares that Défilée emulated Mary, mother of Jesus, when she sacrificed her children in the revolution to protect Haiti.

Défilée's story was adapted by Harlem Renaissance writers. She is depicted in John F. Matheus and Clarence Cameron White's 1932 opera, Ouanga!, and Langston Hughes's 1936 play, Emperor of Haiti. The Haitian historian Windsor Bellegarde reversed the roles when describing the assassination's aftermath in 1947, as if a sane Défilée taught a lesson to the mad citizens of Port-au-Prince. The Haitian playwright Henock Trouillot imagined her role in the aftermath in his 1967 play Dessalines ou le sang du Pont-Rouge (Dessalines or the Blood of Pont-Rouge). The historian Jean Fouchard also recorded Jérémie's testimony in the 1950s for his 1972 book La meringue: danse nationale d'Haïti (The Meringue: Haiti's National Dance).

Défilée was re-embraced from 1994 to 1995 during Operation Uphold Democracy, a military intervention in Haiti led by the U.S. and United Nations. In particular, women authors in the Haitian diaspora adapted her during and after the intervention. In his 1994 song "Defile", the Haitian protest singer Manno Charlemagne describes Défilée as courageous and patriotic and encourages listeners to follow her example. Dayan wrote an overview of Défilée and her legacy in the 1995 book Haiti, History, and the Gods. Défilée is named in a few short stories in Edwidge Danticat's 1995 collection Krik? Krak!, portrayed as an lwa to Haitian women and an ancestor to many characters. Myriam J. A. Chancy also depicts Défilée in her 2003 book Spirit of Haiti. In 2020, the Haitian feminist organization Solidarite Fanm Ayisyèn held a gathering titled Ann Refè Jès Défilée a! (Let Us Repeat Défilée's Gesture!) to commemorate the victims of the 2018 La Saline massacre.
