= Love, Anger, Madness =

1968 Haitian short novel collection

- Cover of the 2009 English translation
- Author: Marie Vieux-Chauvet
- Original title: Amour, Colère et Folie
- Translator: Rose-Myriam Réjouis, Val Vinokur
- Language: French
- Publisher: Éditions Gallimard (withdrawn); Maisonneuve et Larose/Emina Soleil; Modern Library
- Publication date: 1968 (original); 2005 (reprint)
- English publication date: 2009
- Awards: Deschamps Prize (1986)
- ISBN: 978-2-7068-1871-4 (French edition, 2005); 978-0-679-64351-7 (English edition, 2009)

Love, Anger, Madness (French: Amour, Colère et Folie) is a 1968 collection of short novels published by the Haitian author Marie Vieux-Chauvet. There are three novels in the collection: Love, Anger, and Madness. Love depicts a woman named Claire through her diary entries, Anger tells the story of a family whose land is confiscated by a group of men in black uniforms, and Madness follows a group of mad poets trapped in a shack by an invasion of "devils", a term they use to describe the local paramilitary forces.

Chauvet initially sent Love, Anger, and Madness to French feminist Simone de Beauvoir as three individual manuscripts. Beauvoir recommended their publication as a single volume to the publisher Éditions Gallimard, who published the collection in 1968. It was met with scorn from Haitian critics and, for unclear reasons, suppressed and withdrawn from circulation soon after its publication. After Chauvet's death in 1973, Love, Anger, Madness was awarded the Deschamps Prize in 1986 and saw several new editions and translations, including an official French reprint in 2005 (Note: According to Vitiello, this edition was released in 2004.) and an English translation in 2009. Beninese playwright José Pliya adapted the book into a series of plays between 2007 and 2008.

== Plot ==
=== Love ===
Love (French: Amour) is told from the perspective of Claire Clamont, a mulatto woman who lives with her sisters Annette and Félicia, as well as Félicia's husband, Jean Luze. Through her diary entries, Claire narrates her repressed desire for Jean Luze, who is himself developing an interest in Annette. Meanwhile, the local police chief, Commandant Calédu, terrorizes the local populace through home searches, disappearances, murder, rape, and torture.

One evening, Claire watches through a keyhole in the door as Jean Luze and Annette are involved in what appears to be a sexual encounter. Later, Félicia, who is pregnant, faints upon seeing Annette and Jean Luze together, forcing Jean Luze to end the affair. After Félicia gives birth to a boy named Jean-Claude, a heartbroken Annette attempts suicide but survives and marries the scion of an influential Afro-Haitian family. The story then shifts to an extended flashback, with Claire describing her upbringing, the colorism she faced as a child as the darkest-skinned sister, and the loss of her family's land.

Back in the present, Félicia becomes pregnant again, and Claire is tasked with taking care of Jean-Claude. As Félicia's pregnancy progresses, she falls ill, and Jean Luze takes her to Port-au-Prince alongside Claire and Jean-Claude to receive an abortion. Upon returning from Port-au-Prince, Claire, tired of repressing her desires, plots to kill Félicia with a dagger so that she can be with Jean Luze. However, as a riot breaks out targeting Calédu and his American allies, she instead stabs Calédu in the back.

=== Anger ===
Anger (French: Colère) tells the story of the Normil family, whose land is seized by a group of men in black uniforms. The grandfather of the family is strongly opposed to relinquishing the land. The father vows to hold on to it, but his attempt to solicit assistance from a lawyer goes poorly. Rose, his daughter, is sexually harassed by one of the Blackshirts, who is visiting the lawyer's office, and the lawyer charges the family $500 upfront for his services. The father gets the money from his wealthy mistress, but the lawyer will not take it from him, insisting that Rose deliver it. Later, Rose's younger brother Paul sees her get into a car with the man from the lawyer's office, who is referred to as "the Gorilla". Realizing that Rose is having sex with the Gorilla, Paul vows to kill him.

The story then switches perspectives from third-person to a series of first person stream of consciousness narrations. A section narrated by Rose describes her sadistic rape (Note: For brevity, this summary uses the word "rape" to describe what happens to Rose. This view is not universally accepted by scholars. For a more detailed discussion, see § Anger.) at the hand of the Gorilla. It is revealed that he told Rose that if she had sex with him regularly for a month, the family's plot would be restored. Meanwhile, the father sows division amongst the Blackshirts by selling the family's land in parcels, prompting the Blackshirts to argue over who gets what. In the ensuing conflict, one of the Gorilla's lieutenants shoots him. The grandfather is then killed by the Blackshirts alongside Rose and Paul's disabled brother. Rose dies from exhaustion soon afterward.

=== Madness ===
Madness (French: Folie) is a stream of consciousness narrative told from the perspective of René, a poet hiding in a shack while a group of uniformed paramilitaries referred to as "devils" besiege the town around him. He is soon joined by another poet, André. After Jacques, another poet, joins them, René plots a rebellion against the devils using homemade Molotov cocktails. Their numbers grow again with the arrival of a fourth poet, a white man named Simon. Jacques, who is naturally timid, passes out from fright when Simon suggests opening the doors and eventually dies. After this, René, in a fit of madness, runs into the street and throws a Molotov cocktail.

After this, in an extended dramatic dialogue structured like a play, it is revealed that the poets have hallucinated the presence of the devils. The local police commandant arrests them for arson. Cécile, a woman living across the street, is accused of collaborating with them and arrested as well. The commandant interrogates the poets and orders their execution. René prays for aid from God, and the narrative ends with a vision of angels descending.

== Publication history ==
=== Background ===
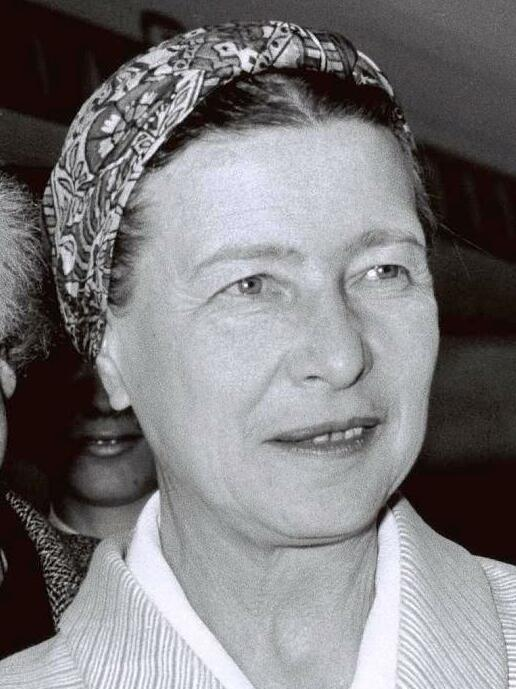
Simone de Beauvoir

Haitian author Marie Vieux-Chauvet began corresponding with French feminist Simone de Beauvoir in 1967, asking Beauvoir to recommend her writing to French publisher Éditions Gallimard. She also described the oppressive conditions faced by writers under François Duvalier, whose dictatorship, beginning in 1957, saw an escalation of state violence deployed by the Tonton Macoute, a paramilitary and secret police force. In 1968, Chauvet wrote Love, Anger, Madness, her fourth book after Fille d'Haiti (transl. 'Daughter of Haiti'), La Danse sur le volcan (transl. 'Dance on the Volcano'), and Fonds-des-nègres (transl. 'Negro Bottom'). She submitted the trilogy as three separate manuscripts to Beauvoir upon its completion, and Beauvoir recommended it to Éditions Gallimard for publication as a single volume.

=== Initial release and controversy ===
After its publication in 1968, Love, Anger, Madness was met with public scorn from Haitian critics. According to literary critic J. Michael Dash, the book's political boldness and its critique of the Haitian elite prevented it from achieving widespread acclaim. For unclear reasons, it was also withdrawn from circulation. Various accounts are given of these events. Writer Madison Smartt Bell claims that Chauvet herself convinced Éditions Gallimard to withdraw the book from publication. According to Myriam J. A. Chancy, Pierre and his family suppressed its distribution by buying back unsold copies and forbidding translation, fearing government reprisal due to the trilogy's criticism of the Duvalier regime. Translator Rose-Myriam Réjouis claims the book's distribution was canceled due to concerns about the safety of Chauvet's family expressed by the Haitian ambassador to France. Academic Frank Laraque claims Editions Gallimard agreed to limit publicity for the book due to pressure from "spineless and cowardly people", hoping to protect the author's relatives who remained in Haiti. Discouraged by the suppression of Amour, Colère et Folie and facing threats from the regime, Chauvet left her husband and Haiti in 1969 to move to New York City. She died of a brain tumor there on 19 June 1973. In 1986, she was posthumously awarded the Deschamps Prize, which is awarded annually to works written in French or a French-based creole language, for Love, Anger, Madness.

=== Posthumous editions and translations ===
Several editions of Love, Anger, Madness were published after Chauvet's death. An unauthorized edition based on scans of the 1968 edition was released by Voix de Femmes in 2003. Others were issued by Maisonneuve et Larose in collaboration with Emina Soleil in 2005, by Zellige in 2008, and by Zulma in 2015. German and Italian translations were released by Ullstein Verlag and Bompiani respectively. A Serbian translation was released by Laguna in 2008. In 2009, Random House released an English translation by Rose-Myriam Rejouis and Val Vinokur under its Modern Library imprint.

== Critical analysis ==
=== Love ===
Several scholars have analyzed Claire's feelings of inferiority in Love. Researchers Kaiama L. Glover and Keisha Simone Allan both tie these feelings to philosopher Frantz Fanon's concept of "epidermalization", a term Fanon uses to denote the practice of associating black skin with inferiority and the difficulties this association imposes on black people. According to Glover, Claire's sexual repression is the result of her mother's "ill-disguised shame at having a brown-skinned daughter" and therefore the "bigotry of the bourgeois mulatto community". Allan also argues that Claire's feelings of self-loathing are "linked to the racial tensions in her socio-political milieu". Both Glover and Allan tie Claire's personal struggle to the broader power inversion experienced by the mulatto community amidst the ascendancy of Caledu, who represents the noirist (Note: Noirism was a Haitian ethnological and political movement that emphasized African heritage, black leadership, and Vodou. It was ideological foundation of the Duvalier dictatorship.) state. Allan also links her struggle to efforts by middle-class Haitians to distance themselves from their African ancestry.

Scholars have also discussed the ways in which portrayals of race and class intersect with gender in Love. Researcher Hellen Lee-Keller argues that Claire's narrative critiques the economic, political, and social structures that limit women's political and public engagement. She singles out the ways that the demands imposed on Claire due to her class and gender conflict with those placed on her by her family, leading to the "fragmentation of [her] identity.". Glover argues that Claire has internalized the hegemonic valuation of elite mulatto women's bodies as objects to be used in marital transactions, which contributes to her belief in her inferiority. Researcher Kerstin Oloff Claire figuratively situates Claire within the gothic tradition of the "female zombie" whose soul and agency have been stolen, rendering her a compliant, atomized figure trapped by the patriarchal and capitalist structures of her society.

Love's portrayal of peasants has also been the subject of scholarly analysis. Lee-Keller discusses the peasants that work Claire's father's land, highlighting the contrast between their impoverished existence and the Clamont family's obscene wealth, which is built upon their labor and the family's ignorance of their suffering in a reflection of slavery in Saint-Domingue. Oloff argues that Chauvet uses gothic conventions to link Claire's figurative "zombification" to the exploitation of the Haitian peasantry and the environment, with the zombie figure acting as a displaced representation of the socio-ecological alienation and material exploitation caused by United States imperialism in the global imagination. Literary scholar Colin Dayan observes that while Chauvet's peasants perform deference to Haitian elites, their apparent passivity is a survival strategy that masks subversive agency.

=== Anger ===
The classification of sexual violence in Anger has been the subject of scholarly debate. Researcher Liddy Detar argues that Rose's sexual encounters with the Gorilla are best understood not as rapes, but as a form of political sexual torture, which systematically destroys the victim's language and world. She further argues that Rose "develops an intimacy with the Gorille on whom her own life depends" to reclaim her agency and confront her complicity in the exchanges, subverting the victim/torturer binary and acknowledging mulattos' role in the historical exploitation of Afro-Haitians. Dayan compares the encounters between Rose and the Gorilla to the myth of Sister Rose, a mythical Haitian woman whose rape is said to have founded the nation. She argues that Rose subverts this myth by "willingly offer[ing] herself in exchange for land". Researcher Elizabeth Walcott-Hackshaw characterizes this exchange as a "Faustian pact".

Chancy describes the encounters as rapes, emphasizing their brutality while simultaneously stating that they come as a result of a "poor choice" by Rose, who attempts to protect her class status rather than "undo[ing] the harms of the dictatorship". Researcher Régine Michelle Jean-Charles argues that what happens to Rose is rape because Rose submits her body "out of fear", which "obliterates the option of consent". Per Jean-Charles, Rose's rape is representative of the terror of the Duvalier regime, during which people's private lives "no longer belonged to them", and "is an example of how seizure by the state also extends to the female body". Researcher Laura Roldán-Sevillano concurs with Jean-Charles's assessment, describing the encounters as rapes and Rose as the Gorilla's "sex slave". She argues that while her family's fear and shame prevent them from helping her, she is empowered as a survivor through her own narrative voice presented at the end of the novel, challenging the culture of silence surrounding rape in Haiti.

=== Madness ===
Analyses of Madness discuss its portrayal of the role of intellectuals under the Duvalier regime. Dash argues that the novel's portrayal of René, whose fantasies of liberation are ultimately self-serving and authoritarian, reveals the Haitian intellectual under Duvalier to be a tragically flawed figure who is alienated from society and who mirrors the oppressive culture they seek to resist. Literary scholar Raphael Dalleo argues that Dash's reading is reductive, countering that the novel takes a more "conflicted perspective" on Haitian intellectuals, mourning the exhaustion of a particular anticolonial modernist ideal while portraying the poets as victims of state terror—distinct from elements of the middle class collaborating with the authoritarian state.

Several scholars note Madness's use of the carnivalesque mode, first conceptualized by Russian literary scholar Mikhail Bakhtin as a mode that uses popular humor to resist official hierarchies. Dash compares the structure of the novel to the structure of a carnival, describing the presence of the "devils" as a "gruesome masequerade". He concludes that the use of the carnivalesque mode in Madness is a pessimistic illusion that reflects the "ludicrous nightmare" of Haitian society. Researcher Charlee M. Redman Bezilla argues that Madness contains elements of the Romantic grotesque and carnivalesque modes, creating a chaotic public spectacle that lacks the "regenerative aspect" of the carnivalesque but that still opens a space for revolt and social critique.

The novel's use of religious themes is also noted by several scholars. Dayan highlights Chauvet's framing of Haitian Vodou, not as a system of abstract beliefs, but as a form of inheritance that resists modernity's attempts to erase it. Meanwhile, Dash describes René's "esoteric spirituality" as a form of escape from the "psychic agony" he endures, comparing the poets to a "tiny, extremist sect". He also compares the poets' deployment of "images of martyrdom and apocalyptic rebirth" and their dreams of a "wrathful God, who with fire and brimstone will create order from the prevailing chaos" to the language used in the biblical Book of Revelation.

== Adaptations ==
Beninese playwright José Pliya adapted Love, from Love, Anger, Madness, into a play in 2007. The play is an abridged three-part monologue focusing on the character Claire. Adaptations of Anger and Madness were also produced and staged between 2007 and 2008 in Guadeloupe.

== Sources ==
- Allan, Keisha Simone (2023). "Epidermalization of Inferiority: A Fanonian Reading of Marie Vieux-Chauvet's Amour". Journal of French and Francophone Philosophy. 30 (2): 95–101. doi:10.5195/jffp.2022.1028. ISSN 2155-1162.
- Birch, Dinah; Hooper, Katy, eds. (2012). "Carnivalesque". The Concise Oxford Companion to English Literature. Oxford University Press.
- Chancy, Myriam J. A. (2004). "'No Giraffes in Haiti': Haitian Women and State Terror". In Sourieau, Marie-Agnès; Balutansky, Kathleen M. (eds.). Ecrire en pays assiégé – Haïti – Writing under Siege. Brill. doi:10.1163/9789004485471_016. ISBN 978-90-04-48547-1.
- Dalleo, Raphael (2011). Caribbean Literature and the Public Sphere. Charlottesville: University of Virginia Press. ISBN 978-0-8139-3202-6.
- Dash, J. Michael (1998). The Other America: Caribbean Literature in a New World Context. Charlottesville: University of Virginia Press. ISBN 978-0-8139-1764-1.
- Dash, Michael (2005). "Noirisme". In France, Peter (ed.). The New Oxford Companion to Literature in French. Oxford University Press. doi:10.1093/acref/9780198661252.001.0001.
- Dayan, Joan (1998). Haiti, History, and the Gods. Berkeley: University of California Press. ISBN 978-0-520-21368-5.
- Detar, Liddy (2002). Intimacies of empire: Post-colonial women's writing from the Caribbean, France and United States (Doctoral thesis). Santa Cruz: University of California, Santa Cruz.
- Glover, Kaiama L. (2013). "'Black' Radicalism in Haiti and the Disorderly Feminine: The Case of Marie Vieux Chauvet". Small Axe: A Caribbean Journal of Criticism. 17 (1): 7–21. doi:10.1215/07990537-1665407. ISSN 0799-0537.
- Glover, Kaiama L. (2016). "Chauvet, Marie Vieux". In Knight, Franklin W.; Gates Jr., Henry Louis (eds.). Dictionary of Caribbean and Afro–Latin American Biography. Oxford University Press.
- Heinämaa, Sara; Jardine, James (2021). "Objectification, Inferiorization, and Projection in Phenomenological Research on Dehumanization". In Kronfeldner, Maria (ed.). The Routledge Handbook of Dehumanization. London; New York: Routledge. pp. 309–325. ISBN 978-0-429-49246-4.
- Jean-Charles, Régine (2006). "They Never Call It Rape: Critical Reception and Representation of Sexual Violence in Marie Vieux-Chauvet's 'Amour, Colère et Folie'". Journal of Haitian Studies. 12 (2). Center for Black Studies Research: 13–30. ISSN 1090-3488. JSTOR 41715326.
- Joseph, Régine Isabelle (2015). "The Letters of Marie Chauvet and Simone de Beauvoir: A Critical Introduction". Yale French Studies (128): 25–39. ISSN 0044-0078. JSTOR 24643709.
- Kim, Allen (2016). "Duvalier, François". In Knight, Franklin W.; Gates Jr., Henry Louis (eds.). Dictionary of Caribbean and Afro–Latin American Biography. Oxford University Press.
- Kruidenier Tolliver, Julie-Françoise (2012). "Reading Albania Reading Chauvet: Solidarity and the Publication of Amour, Colère et Folie". Women in French Studies. 2012 (1): 228–247. doi:10.1353/wfs.2012.0036. ISSN 2166-5486.
- Lee-Keller, Hellen (2009). "Madness and the Mulâtre-Aristocrate: Haiti, Decolonization, and Women in Marie Chauvet's Amour". Callaloo. 32 (4): 1293–1311. doi:10.1353/cal.0.0512. ISSN 1080-6512.
- Miller, Judith G. (2019). "Theatricalizing Amour, Colère, et Folie: José Pliya "Adapts" and "Adjusts" Marie Vieux-Chauvet". In Flaugh, Christian; Taub Robles, Lena (eds.). Marie Vieux Chauvet's Theatres: Thought, Form, and Performance of Revolt. Leiden; Boston: Brill. pp. 161–179. ISBN 978-90-04-38808-6.
- Oloff, Kerstin (2018). "Marie Vieux Chauvet's World-Gothic: Commodity Frontiers, 'Cheap Natures' and the Monstrous-Feminine". In Casanova-Vizcaíno, Sandra; Ordiz, Inés (eds.). Latin American Gothic in Literature and Culture. New York: Routledge. pp. 122–137. ISBN 978-1-315-30767-1.
- Paravisini-Gebert, Lizabeth; Torres-Seda, Olga, eds. (1993). Caribbean Women Novelists: An Annotated Critical Bibliography. Westport; London: Greenwood. ISBN 0-313-28342-7.
- "Prix Littéraire" [Literary Prize]. Fondation Lucienne Deschamps (in French).
- Roldán-Sevillano, Laura (2023). "Breaking Silences around Postcolonial Sexual Violence: The Urgent Activist Role of Contemporary Haitian American Women's Fiction". Babel – AFIAL (32): 27–51. doi:10.35869/afial.v0i32.4479. ISSN 2660-4906.
- Redman Bezilla, Charlee M. (2019). "The Carnivalesque Theatre of Revolt in Marie Vieux-Chauvet's Folie". In Flaugh, Christian; Taub Robles, Lena (eds.). Marie Vieux Chauvet's Theatres: Thought, Form, and Performance of Revolt. Brill. pp. 67–84. doi:10.1163/9789004388086_006. ISBN 978-90-04-38808-6.
- Smartt Bell, Madison (2011). "Permanent Exile: On Marie Vieux-Chauvet". The Nation. Archived from the original on 21 February 2013.
- Spear, Thomas C. (2015). "Marie Chauvet: The Fortress Still Stands". Yale French Studies (128). Yale University Press: 9–24. ISSN 0044-0078. JSTOR 24643708.
- Vitiello, Joëlle (2021). "Marie Vieux Chauvet". Île en île (in French).
- Walcott-Hackshaw, Elizabeth (2005). "My Love Is Like a Rose: Terror, Territoire, and the Poetics of Marie Chauvet". Small Axe. 9 (2): 40–51. doi:10.1353/smx.2005.0031. ISSN 1534-6714.
