= Aimé Césaire bibliography =

Cadastre (1961) and Moi, laminaire (1982)

Each year links to its corresponding "[year] in poetry" article for poetry, or "[year] in literature" article for other works:

== Poetry ==
- 1939: Cahier d'un retour au pays natal, Paris: Volontés, OCLC 213466273.
- 1946: Les armes miraculeuses, Paris: Gallimard, OCLC 248258485.
- 1947: Cahier d'un retour au pays natal, Paris: Bordas, OCLC 369684638.
- 1948: Soleil cou-coupé, Paris: K, OCLC 4325153.
- 1950: Corps perdu, Paris: Fragrance, OCLC 245836847.
- 1960: Ferrements, Paris: Editions du Seuil, OCLC 59034113.
- 1961: Cadastre, Paris: Editions du Seuil, OCLC 252242086.
- 1982: Moi, laminaire, Paris: Editions du Seuil, ISBN 978-2-02-006268-8.
- 1994: Comme un malentendu de salut ..., Paris: Editions du Seuil, ISBN 2-02-021232-3

== Theatre ==
- 1943: ......Et les chiens se taisaient. Durham: Duke University Press, 2024.
- 1958: Et les Chiens se taisaient, tragédie: arrangement théâtral. Paris: Présence Africaine; reprint: 1997.
- 1963: La Tragédie du roi Christophe. Paris: Présence Africaine; reprint: 1993; The Tragedy of King Christophe, New York: Grove, 1969.
- 1966: Une saison au Congo. Paris: Seuil; reprint: 2001; A Season in the Congo, New York, 1968 (a play about Patrice Lumumba).
- 1969: Une Tempête, adapted from The Tempest by William Shakespeare: adaptation pour un théâtre nègre. Paris: Seuil; reprint: 1997; A Tempest, New York: Ubu repertory, 1986.

== Other writings ==
- "Poésie et connaissance", Tropiques (12): 158–70, January 1945.
- Discours sur le colonialisme, Paris: Présence Africaine, 1955, OCLC 8230845.
- Lettre à Maurice Thorez, Paris: Présence Africaine, 24 October 1956.
- Toussaint Louverture: La Révolution française et le problème colonial, Paris: Club français du livre, 1960, OCLC 263448333.

== General and cited sources ==
- Birch, Dinah (2009). "Césaire, Aimé". In Birch, Dinah (ed.). The Oxford Companion to English Literature (7th ed.). Oxford University Press. p. 207. doi:10.1093/acref/9780192806871.001.0001. ISBN 978-0-19-280687-1. OCLC 454394438 – via the Internet Archive.
- Breslin, Paul (2011). "Césaire, Aimé". In Gates, Henry Louis Jr.; Akyeampong, Emmanuel; Niven, Steven J. (eds.). Dictionary of African Biography. Oxford University Press. pp. 51–52. doi:10.1093/acref/9780195382075.001.0001. ISBN 978-0-19-538207-5. OCLC 770668294 – via the Internet Archive.
- Césaire, Aimé (2017). "Comme un malentendu de salut". In Eshleman, Clayton; Arnold, A. James (eds.). The Complete Poetry of Aimé Césaire: Bilingual Edition (in English and French). Translated by Eshleman, Clayton; Arnold, A. James. Introduction, notes and glossary by A. James Arnold. Middletown, Connecticut: Wesleyan University Press. pp. 852–853. ISBN 978-0-8195-7751-1. OCLC 1073059069. Project MUSE book 2007811 – via Google Books.
- Davis, Gregson (2010). "Césaire, Aimé". In Irele, Abiola; Jeyifo, Biodun (eds.). The Oxford Encyclopedia of African Thought. Oxford University Press. pp. 216–219. doi:10.1093/acref/9780195334739.001.0001. ISBN 978-0-19-533473-9. OCLC 428033171 – via Google Books.
- Davis, Gregson (2016). "Césaire, Aimé". In Knight, Franklin W.; Gates, Henry Louis Jr. (eds.). Dictionary of Caribbean and Afro–Latin American Biography. Oxford University Press. doi:10.1093/acref/9780199935796.001.0001. ISBN 978-0-19-993579-6. OCLC 952785428.
- Watts, Richard (2010). "Césaire, Aimé". In Gates, Henry Louis Jr.; Appiah, Kwame Anthony (eds.). Encyclopedia of Africa. Oxford University Press. pp. 251–252. doi:10.1093/acref/9780195337709.001.0001. ISBN 978-0-19-533770-9. OCLC 671743335 – via the Internet Archive.
