= Valcin =

Valcin is a surname of Haitian origin. Notable people with the surname include:

- Cléante Valcin (1891–1956), Haitian activist and writer
- David Valcin (fl. from 1992), American actor
- Gerard Valcin (1923–1988), Haitian painter
