= Marie Vieux-Chauvet =

Haitian writer (1916–1973)

- Vieux-Chauvet, Port-au-Prince 1963
- Born: Marie Vieux; 16 September 1916; Port-au-Prince, Haiti
- Died: 19 June 1973 (aged 56); New York City, U.S.
- Occupation: Writer
- Writing career
- Pen name: Colibri
- Period: c. 1947–1973
- Genres: Novels, plays, short stories

Marie Vieux-Chauvet (French pronunciation: [maʁi vjø ʃovɛ]; born Marie Vieux; 16 September 1916 – 19 June 1973) was a Haitian novelist, playwright, and short story writer. Her novels are considered by translator Myriam J. A. Chancy to be "by far the best-known works by a Haitian woman novelist". Born in Port-au-Prince, Chauvet grew up during the United States occupation of Haiti. She began writing at the age of 10 and attended the Annex of the Upper School for Teachers, receiving her certificate in 1933. During the late 1940s, she wrote several plays, and during the 1950s, she wrote her first three novels. She became involved with the literary collective Haïti Littéraire during the early 1960s.

Chauvet sparked controversy in 1968 with the publication of Amour, Colere et Folie (transl. 'Love, Anger, Madness'), a collected trilogy of short novels. The book was met with disdain from Haitian critics and, for unclear reasons, suppressed and withdrawn from circulation. After the novel's suppression, facing threats from the regime of dictator François Duvalier, Chauvet went into exile in New York City, where she died from a brain tumor. Her fifth book, Les Rapaces (transl. 'Birds of Prey'), was published posthumously in 1986. Her work is noted by scholars such as Sophie Mariñez for its theatrical style, with common themes including gender, race, sexual violence, and Haitian Vodou. She has served as an inspiration for other Haitian writers such as Edwidge Danticat and Ghislaine Charlier.

== Early life ==
Marie Vieux-Chauvet was born Marie Vieux in Port-au-Prince on 16 September 1916. Her father, Constant Vieux, was a Haitian ambassador and senator, and her mother, Delia Nones, was of Jewish West Indian descent. Her early years were spent under the United States occupation of Haiti, during which the United States instituted various socioeconomic and political reforms, including seizing land to create foreign-owned plantations and re-instituting forced labor, violently repressing resistance. Her father, who was a member of the Haitian anti-occupation group Union Patriotique and editor of the anti-occupation periodical Le Courier Haitien, provided her with a political education. She began writing at the age of 10, eventually attending the Annex of the Upper School for Teachers, an educational institute that trained primary school instructors. She earned her certificate in 1933. The occupation ended a year later, in 1934, with the withdrawal of American troops. At some point, she married physician Aymon Charlier. The couple had two daughters, Régine and Erma, before divorcing. She subsequently married travel agent Pierre Chauvet. The couple had one son, Pierre.

== Literary career ==
=== Early works ===
During the 1940s, Chauvet wrote two plays. The first, La Legende des fleurs (transl. 'The Flowers' Tale'), is an allegory where flowers in a garden stand in as a metaphor for gender dynamics within society. It was published under the pen-name "Colibri" (transl. 'Hummingbird') some time between 1947 and 1949. (Note: 1947 according to Paravisini-Gebert & Torres-Seda and Jean-Charles, 1949 according to Mariñez) Her second play, Samba, was unpublished but first staged in 1948.

In 1954, Chauvet wrote the short story "Ti-Moune nan bois" (transl. 'Child in the woods'), which was published in Optique. She also published her first novel, Fille d'Haiti (transl. 'Daughter of Haiti'), that same year. Fille d'Haiti, which won the 1954 Alliance Française Prize, tells the story of Lotus, the child of a sex worker, whose origins alienate her from her middle-class surroundings. In 1957, she published her second novel, La Danse sur le volcan (transl. 'Dance on the Volcano'), a historical novel about a mulatto opera singer set during the Haitian Revolution. Her third novel, Fonds-des-nègres (transl. 'Negro Bottom'), was published in 1960, winning the France-Antilles Prize for that year. It explores the role of Vodou in Haitian society through the eyes of Marie-Ange, a woman from Port-au-Prince who tries to help the impoverished inhabitants of a small village.

Throughout the 1960s, Chauvet became involved with Haïti Littéraire, a loose collective of politically-oriented artists and poets who sought to broaden Haitian literature beyond its nationalist focus, advocating for a more human-centered approach to writing and promoting cultural and educational initiatives through a variety of artistic mediums. Chauvet's exact relationship to the group is disputed. According to researcher Julie-Françoise Tolliver, Chauvet "belonged" to Haïti Littéraire. However, according to researcher Kaiama L. Glover, she was only tangentially involved with the group during the early 1960s. According to researcher Joëlle Vitiello, she hosted the group in her home on Sundays.

=== Amour, Colère et Folie ===
Chauvet began corresponding with French feminist Simone de Beauvoir in 1967, asking Beauvoir to recommend her writing to French publisher Éditions Gallimard. She also described the oppressive conditions faced by writers under François Duvalier, whose dictatorship began a decade earlier in 1957 and saw an escalation of state violence deployed by the Tonton Macoute, a paramilitary and secret police force. In 1968, Chauvet wrote Amour, Colere et Folie (transl. 'Love, Anger, Madness'), a collected trilogy of short novels. Amour depicts a woman named Claire through her diary entries, Colère tells the story of a family whose land is confiscated by a military commander, and Folie follows a group of mad poets trapped in a shack by an invasion of "devils", a term used to describe local paramilitary forces. Chauvet submitted the trilogy to Beauvoir upon its completion, after which Beauvoir recommended it to Éditions Gallimard for publication.

After its publication, Amour, Colère et Folie was met with public scorn from Haitian critics and withdrawn from circulation. Various accounts are given of these events. Writer Madison Smartt Bell claims that Chauvet herself convinced Éditions Gallimard to withdraw the book from publication. According to Myriam J. A. Chancy, Pierre and his family suppressed its distribution by buying back unsold copies and forbidding translation, fearing government reprisal due to the trilogy's criticism of the Duvalier regime. Translator Rose-Myriam Réjouis claims the book's distribution was canceled due to concerns about the safety of Chauvet's family expressed by the Haitian ambassador to France. Academic Frank Laraque claims Editions Gallimard agreed to limit publicity for the book due to pressure from "spineless and cowardly people", hoping to protect the author's relatives who remained in Haiti.

== Exile and death ==
Discouraged by the suppression of Amour, Colère et Folie and facing threats from the regime, Chauvet left her husband and Haiti in 1969. While she had initially considered Paris as a candidate for immigration, she ultimately opted to move to New York City, moving from one apartment to another in Queens before settling in the Upper East Side. In 1970, she married Ted Proudfoot, an American petroleum industry worker. In a letter dated 14 May 1971, she indicated that she was writing a book discussing her exile and relationship with Proudfoot. According to a subsequent letter dated 18 June 1971, she may have also moved to Bronxville, New York. At some point during her exile, she completed the manuscript for Les Rapaces (transl. 'Birds of Prey'), a novella told from the perspective of a young girl and a cat. However, she died on 19 June 1973 of a brain tumor before it could be released. It was published posthumously in 1986, over a decade after her death. She was working on two other books at the time of her death as well: Les Fils d'Ogoun (transl. 'The Sons of Ogou') and Le Cri (transl. 'The Cry').

== Writing and reception ==
Various sources discuss Chauvet's early dramatic work, particularly La Légende des fleurs. According to researcher Alessandra Benedicty-Kokken, the play analyzes societal notions of race, ultimately reflecting on the "tragically violent and humiliating consequences of Whiteness". Literary scholar Régine Michelle Jean-Charles gives an ecofeminist reading of the play, arguing that it uses its nature allegory to examine racial and gendered hierarchies. She describes the interconnected interactions of the flowers with each other and with the surrounding environment as representing an "ecological perspective", noting the uneven power dynamics between the flowers (which use feminine pronouns) and the sun, the butterfly, and the nightingale (which use masculine pronouns). Researcher Sophie Mariñez posits that there is a "compelling case" that performance and theatricality, as exemplified in Chauvet's theatrical work, are defining elements of Chauvet's fiction as a whole.

Glover identifies class, gender, race, and sexuality as common themes in Chauvet's first three novels. She argues that Fille d'Haïti is a reflection of the political upheaval taking place in Haiti in 1946 under Élie Lescot, examining contemporary color-based tensions and foreshadowing François Duvalier's eventual rise to power. Meanwhile, in discussing La Danse sur le volcan, researcher Curtis Small argues that Chauvet uses historical reconstruction to explore themes of gender and sexuality. Literary scholar Raphael Dalleo argues that the novel reflects Haitian anticolonialism while also depicting the race, class, and gender-based tensions of the revolutionary struggle. Glover characterizes Fonds-des-nègres as a critique of systemic corruption and gendered violence across Haitian society, while historian and literary critic Carrol F. Coates highlights its depiction of rural Vodou culture and the protagonist's transformative journey from alienation to spiritual belonging. Colin Dayan similarly notes the use of Vodou in the novel, discussing how Chauvet's portrayal diverges from typical idealized and academic representations, instead grounding the religion in the material realities of the Haitian poor.

In Amour, Colère et Folie, researchers Lizabeth Paravisini-Gebert and Olga Torres-Seda identify themes of sexual and political repression. Tolliver highlights the book's portrayal of violence against women, as well as its variety of narrative styles and its depictions of oppression, martyrdom, and resistance. Glover and researcher Keisha Simone Allan discuss the character Claire's feelings of inferiority in Amour, linking them to Frantz Fanon's concept of "epidermalization", a term Fanon uses to denote the practice of associating black skin with inferiority and the difficulties this association imposes on black people. Jean-Charles discusses the deployment of sexual violence in the book, characterizing the rape of the character Rose in Colère as being representative of social discourses surrounding rape culture. Analyses of Folie discuss its portrayal of the role of intellectuals under the Duvalier regime. Dash argues that it portrays the novel's protagonists as tragically flawed figures trapped by their self-centered ideals while Dalleo argues that it offers a more conflicted perspective, mourning the exhaustion of an anticolonial ideal while distinguishing the protagonists from middle-class collaborators with the authoritarian regime.

Les Rapaces, Chauvet's posthumously-published novella, is described by Glover as a reflection on the regime of Jean-Claude Duvalier, François's son. Meanwhile, Benedicty-Kokken describes Les Rapaces as a formally experimental work that critiques totalitarianism, contemporary biopolitics, and the emergence of a human rights paradigm dominated by capitalism, the bourgeoisie, and the United States.

== Legacy ==
According to Chancy, Chauvet's novels are "by far the best-known works by a Haitian woman novelist", inspiring other Haitian writers like Ghislaine Charlier. Writer Edwidge Danticat also cites her as an inspiration. In 1986, she was posthumously awarded the Deschamps Prize, which is awarded annually to works written in French or a French-based creole language, for Amour, Colère, et Folie. Excerpts from her work were published in the 1989 anthology Her True-true Name and the 1992 anthology Daughters of Africa. Beninese playwright José Pliya adapted Amour, from Amour, Colère, et Folie, into a play in 2007. The play is an abridged three-part monologue focusing on the character Claire. Adaptations of Colère and Folie were also produced and staged between 2007 and 2008 in Guadeloupe. In 2016, on the centennial of Chauvet's birth, celebratory activities were organized in cities across the world, including New York City, Port-au-Prince, and Montreal, Quebec. As part of the centennial, a symposium on Chauvet was held, during which artist and academic Gina Athena Ulysse read excerpts from Chauvet's work; theater director Alice Reagan dramatized readings from La Legende des fleurs, Les Rapaces, and an unpublished draft of Amour; and scholar Lena Taub Robles translated Pliya's adaptation of Amour into English.

== Bibliography ==
=== Plays ===
- La Legende des fleurs (1947-1949, transl. 'The Flowers' Tale')
- Samba (unpublished, first staged in 1948)

=== Short stories ===
- "Ti-Moune nan bois" (1954, transl. 'Little Moune in the woods')

=== Novels ===
- Fille d'Haiti (1954, transl. 'Daughter of Haiti')
- La Danse sur le volcan (1957, transl. 'Dance on the Volcano')
- Fonds-des-nègres (1960, transl. 'Negro Bottom')
- Amour, Colere et Folie (1968, transl. 'Love, Anger, Madness')
- Les Rapaces (1986, published posthumously, transl. 'Birds of Prey')

== See also ==
- Caribbean literature

== Sources ==
- Allan, Keisha Simone (2023). "Epidermalization of Inferiority: A Fanonian Reading of Marie Vieux-Chauvet's Amour". Journal of French and Francophone Philosophy. 30 (2): 95–101. doi:10.5195/jffp.2022.1028. ISSN 2155-1162.
- Benedicty-Kokken, Alessandra (2015). "'The Origins of Totalitarianism': From Resistance to Human Rights in Marie Chauvet's 'Les rapaces'". Yale French Studies (128). Yale University Press: 57–73. ISSN 0044-0078. JSTOR 24643711.
- Benedicty-Kokken, Alessandra (2019). "'Bloodied Flower': On Translating the Burden of the Floral in Marie Chauvet's La Légende des Fleurs". In Flaugh, Christian; Taub Robles, Lena (eds.). Marie Vieux Chauvet's Theatres: Thought, Form, and Performance of Revolt. Leiden; Boston: Brill. pp. 221–230. ISBN 978-90-04-38808-6.
- Busby, Margaret, ed. (1992). Daughters of Africa. New York: Pantheon. ISBN 0-679-41634-X.
- Chancy, Myriam J.A. (1997). Framing Silence: Revolutionary Novels by Haitian Women. New Brunswick: Rutgers University Press. ISBN 0-8135-2339-7.
- Dalleo, Raphael (2011). Caribbean Literature and the Public Sphere: From the Plantation to the Postcolonial. Charlottesville: University of Virginia Press. ISBN 978-0-8139-3198-2.
- Dash, J. Michael (1981). Literature and Ideology in Haiti, 1915–1961. London: Springer. ISBN 978-1-349-05670-5.
- Dash, J. Michael (1998). The Other America: Caribbean Literature in a New World Context. Charlottesville: University of Virginia Press. ISBN 978-0-8139-1764-1.
- Dayan, Joan (1998). Haiti, History, and the Gods. Berkeley: University of California Press. ISBN 978-0-520-21368-5.
- Dize, Nathan H. (3 April 2022). "'Proof(s) of Memory': Massillon Coicou, Marie Chauvet, and Transgressive Mourning under Totalitarianism". Caribbean Quarterly. 68 (2): 171–193. doi:10.1080/00086495.2022.2068845. ISSN 0008-6495.
- Glover, Kaiama L. (2013). ""Black" Radicalism in Haiti and the Disorderly Feminine: The Case of Marie Vieux Chauvet". Small Axe. 17 (1): 7–21. doi:10.1215/07990537-1665407. ISSN 0799-0537.
- Glover, Kaiama L. (2016). "Chauvet, Marie Vieux". In Knight, Franklin W.; Gates, Jr., Henry Louis (eds.). Dictionary of Caribbean and Afro–Latin American Biography. Oxford University Press.
- Hallward, Peter (2007). Damming the Flood: Haiti and the Politics of Containment. London; New York: Verso. ISBN 978-1-84467-466-4.
- Heinämaa, Sara; Jardine, James (2021). "Objectification, Inferiorization, and Projection in Phenomenological Research on Dehumanization". In Kronfeldner, Maria (ed.). The Routledge Handbook of Dehumanization. London; New York: Routledge. pp. 309–325. ISBN 978-0-429-49246-4.
- Jean-Charles, Régine (2006). "They Never Call It Rape: Critical Reception and Representation of Sexual Violence in Marie Vieux-Chauvet's "Amour, Colère et Folie"". Journal of Haitian Studies. 12 (2). Center for Black Studies Research: 13–30. ISSN 1090-3488. JSTOR 41715326.
- Jean-Charles, Régine Michelle (2019). "Perceiving the Relationships in Nature: An Ecofeminist Reading of La Légende des Fleurs". In Flaugh, Christian; Taub Robles, Lena (eds.). Marie Vieux Chauvet's Theatres: Thought, Form, and Performance of Revolt. Leiden; Boston: Brill. pp. 161–179. ISBN 978-90-04-38808-6.
- Jean-Louis, Felix III (2020). Between Harlem and Paris: Haitian Internationalism in the Interwar Period, 1919-1937 (Doctoral thesis). Westchester: Florida International University.
- Joseph, Régine Isabelle (2015). "The Letters of Marie Chauvet and Simone de Beauvoir: A Critical Introduction". Yale French Studies (128): 25–39. ISSN 0044-0078. JSTOR 24643709.
- Kim, Allen (2016). "Duvalier, François". In Knight, Franklin W.; Gates, Jr., Henry Louis (eds.). Dictionary of Caribbean and Afro–Latin American Biography. Oxford University Press.
- Kruidenier Tolliver, Julie-Françoise (2012). "Reading Albania Reading Chauvet: Solidarity and the Publication of Amour, Colère et Folie". Women in French Studies. 2012 (1): 228–247. doi:10.1353/wfs.2012.0036. ISSN 2166-5486.
- Mariñez, Sophie (2020). "Marie Vieux Chauvet's Theatres: Thought, Form, and Performance of Revolt (Review)". Journal of Haitian Studies. 26 (1): 151–155. doi:10.1353/jhs.2020.0006. ISSN 2333-7311.
- Miller, Judith G. (2019). "Theatricalizing Amour, Colère, et Folie: José Pliya "Adapts" and "Adjusts" Marie Vieux-Chauvet". In Flaugh, Christian; Taub Robles, Lena (eds.). Marie Vieux Chauvet's Theatres: Thought, Form, and Performance of Revolt. Leiden; Boston: Brill. pp. 161–179. ISBN 978-90-04-38808-6.
- Mordecai, Pamela; Wilson, Betty, eds. (1989). Her True-true Name. Oxford: Heinemann. ISBN 0-435-98906-5.
- Paravisini-Gebert, Lizabeth; Torres-Seda, Olga, eds. (1993). Caribbean Women Novelists: An Annotated Critical Bibliography. Westport; London: Greenwood. ISBN 0-313-28342-7.
- Podur, Justin (2012). Haiti's New Dictatorship: The Coup, the Earthquake and the UN Occupation. London; Toronto; New York: Pluto Press. ISBN 978-0-7453-3257-4.
- "Prix Littéraire" [Literary Prize]. Fondation Lucienne Deschamps (in French).
- Schmidt, Hans (1995). The United States Occupation of Haiti, 1915-1934. New Brunswick: Rutgers University Press. ISBN 0-8135-2203-X.
- Small, Curtis (2009). "The Ambiguities of Agency: Marie Vieux-Chauvet's 'La Danse Sur Le Volcan'". Journal of Haitian Studies. 15 (1/2). Center for Black Studies Research: 239–255. ISSN 1090-3488. JSTOR 41715162.
- Smartt Bell, Madison (2011). "Permanent Exile: On Marie Vieux-Chauvet". The Nation. Archived from the original on 21 February 2013.
- Taub Robles, Lena (2019). "Love: Translation of José Pliya's Amour, as Adapted from Marie Vieux Chauvet's Amour, with Notes from the Translator". In Flaugh, Christian; Taub Robles, Lena (eds.). Marie Vieux Chauvet's Theatres: Thought, Form, and Performance of Revolt. Leiden; Boston: Brill. pp. 180–211. ISBN 978-90-04-38808-6.
- Tucker, Neely (2019). "Edwidge Danticat: The Making of a Novelist". The Library of Congress. Archived from the original on 29 July 2025.
- Vieux-Chauvet, Marie; Coates, Carrol F. (1991). "Fonds des Nègres". Callaloo. 14 (3): 564. doi:10.2307/2931456.
- Vitiello, Joëlle (2021). "Marie Vieux Chauvet". Île en île (in French).
