= The Law Is a White Dog =

2011 book by Colin Dayan

The Law Is a White Dog: How Legal Rituals Make and Unmake Persons
- Cover
- Author: Colin Dayan
- Language: English
- Subject: Law, identity, personhood, marginalization
- Genre: Non-fiction
- Publisher: Princeton University Press
- Publication date: March 3, 2013 (Paperback), 2011 (Hardcover)
- Publication place: United States
- Media type: Print (Hardcover, Paperback), E-book
- Pages: 368
- Awards: Choice's top 25 academic books (2011).
- ISBN: 9780691157870
- Preceded by: The Story of Cruel and Unusual (2007)
- Followed by: With Dogs at the Edge of Life (2015)

The Law Is a White Dog: How Legal Rituals Make and Unmake Persons is a 2011 book by legal scholar and cultural critic Colin Dayan. The work explores the ways in which the law constructs and deconstructs identities, particularly focusing on marginalized individuals and entities such as slaves, prisoners, felons, animals, and even supernatural figures. Dayan draws on a range of legal, historical, and literary sources to examine how legal systems and practices have historically been used to deny personhood and enforce dehumanization, tracing connections from medieval English laws to modern abuses in Supermax and Guantánamo prison. The book sheds light on the legal mechanisms that sustain societal exclusion and cruelty, revealing how civil society often marginalizes and represses through legal rituals. The book was named one of the top 25 academic books of 2011 by Choice.

== Author ==
In her interviews from 2013, 2018, and 2019, Dayan discussed how her work examines the dehumanizing effects of modern legal and punitive systems, particularly focusing on solitary confinement in Supermax prisons and the treatment of marginalized humans and animals. She explores how U.S. legal practices use sanitized language to justify harsh punishments like long-term isolation, which she argues create a "death-in-life" experience that strips prisoners of their personhood. Dayan highlights how legal mechanisms, such as prioritizing the intent of prison officials over the suffering of inmates, make it nearly impossible to challenge such cruel treatment under the Eighth Amendment, connecting this to historical systems of control like slavery. In her 2018 interview with Psychology Today, she extends this argument by drawing parallels between the legal marginalization of prisoners, slaves, and abused dogs, particularly pit bulls. She critiques how legal systems dehumanize and criminalize both humans and animals, urging the development of a new ethical framework that recognizes animals on their own terms. In a 2019 interview with Edge Effects magazine, Dayan emphasizes how pit bulls are racialized and criminalized, reflecting broader societal prejudices that intertwine marginalized human populations—especially African American men—with perceived threats.

== Overview ==
The book explores how the law plays a critical role in shaping, dismantling, and erasing identities, with a focus on both human and nonhuman subjects. Dayan examines legal cases and practices throughout history that have led to the deprivation of personhood, from the treatment of enslaved individuals and felons to the legal status of animals and supernatural entities.

Using a combination of historical and legal analysis, the book addresses questions such as how legal systems define personhood and marginalize certain groups. It draws on examples ranging from medieval English law to contemporary U.S. practices in prisons, specifically Supermax prison and detention centers like Guantánamo prison. The book highlights the legacy of slavery in American legal institutions and how modern legal practices sustain patterns of exclusion and dehumanization.

Dayan connects these themes with broader cultural and spiritual traditions, showing how legal concepts can persist across time and regions. In doing so, The Law Is a White Dog examines the intersection of law, punishment, and social order, shedding light on how legal rituals continue to shape human and animal lives.

The book's notable chapters include discussions on "civil death," a legal concept referring to the loss of personhood for convicted individuals, as well as examinations of legal taxonomies, punishment, and the relationship between law and desire. Through its interdisciplinary approach, the book offers insights into the mechanisms of legal marginalization and their broader societal implications.

== Critical reception ==
In her review, Branka Arsić, from Columbia University, discussed how Dayan explores the power of legal rituals to reshape personhood. Arsić highlighted the book's eclectic references to philosophy, history, and law, emphasizing how legal systems dehumanize individuals, as seen in practices like slavery and civil death. Arsić noted that "Dayan’s readings are novel" because they show how law functions like a natural force, reconfiguring both human and non-human entities in troubling ways. She appreciated how Melville's writings, central to Dayan's analysis, challenge these legal classifications and the resulting social hierarchies.

Nick Mansfield critiqued the work for its argument that modern legal practices are deeply rooted in older religious and spiritual prejudices. He noted that Dayan explored how law constructs categories of exclusion, particularly around race and other marginalized groups, but found her reliance on historical continuity and metaphor underdeveloped.

Mindie Lazarus-Black said the work is "engrossing, imaginative, and erudite". Darren Pacione highlighted the book's challenge to how law constitutes identity and its examination of the permeability of legal personhood. While Martha Merrill Umphrey described the book as a "tour de force of interdisciplinary legal scholarship," noting Dayan's focus on the moral implications of legal practices that unmake personhood.

== Cultural impact and artistic interpretations ==
In 2020, the TULCA Festival of Visual Arts in Galway, Ireland, presented a multidisciplinary program titled The Law is a White Dog, curated by artist Sarah Browne. The project, inspired by Colin Dayan's book, explored themes of legal rituals, personhood, and social exclusion through various artistic mediums such as film, poetry, photography, and performance. Featuring contributions from international artists, poets, and legal experts, the project addressed how legal systems categorize and marginalize certain groups. The program included a series of podcasts, an exhibition, and a book, which combined creative works and scholarly research to challenge conventional understandings of the law's impact on the body, memory, and identity.
