= Haiti, History, and the Gods =

Book on the history, culture, and vodou of Haiti

- Cover
- Author: Colin Dayan
- Language: English
- Subject: Haitian history, culture, vodou, Haitian Revolution
- Genre: Non-fiction
- Publisher: University of California Press
- Publication date: 1995
- Pages: 374
- ISBN: 9780520213685

Haiti, History, and the Gods is a 1995 book by Colin Dayan that studies the history, culture, and religious practices of Haiti. Dayan focuses on the complexities and ambiguities often omitted from traditional historical accounts. Using a wide range of previously untranslated and overlooked sources, including historical texts, legal documents, and vodou rituals, Dayan reconstructs the cultural and spiritual landscape of both French Saint-Domingue and modern Haiti. The book presents vodou and narrative fiction as alternative archives of historical knowledge, offering new insights into the Haitian Revolution and its aftermath.

== Summary ==
The book explores the history, culture, and religious practices of Haiti, with a focus on the complexities often overlooked in traditional historical narratives. The book delves into the transformation of the French colony of Saint-Domingue, which became Haiti in 1804, and uncovers a silenced past through the use of diverse and previously untranslated sources. These sources include historical texts, legal documents, religious works, and literary fictions, some of which have been overlooked or repressed in Haitian historiography.

Dayan examines the intersection of history, fiction, and vodou, arguing that religious rituals and narratives in fiction serve as alternative repositories of historical knowledge. Her research draws on her experiences in Haiti, incorporating insights from vodou practices and local traditions. The book highlights the cultural and spiritual dimensions of Haiti's history, with particular emphasis on figures like the revolutionary leader Jean-Jacques Dessalines and vodou deities such as Ezili.

The book is divided into three parts. The first part, "Rituals of History," explores the complexities of Haiti's historical and cultural identity, particularly in the context of the Haitian Revolution. The second part, "Fictions of Haiti," analyzes how literature and vodou reflect the lived experiences and spiritual beliefs of the Haitian people. The third part, "Last Days of Saint-Domingue," focuses on the final years of the French colony and its role in shaping the modern Americas, touching on themes of race, slavery, and enlightenment thought.

== Reviews ==
In October 2023, the book was among the six works selected on Ben Fountain's list of favorite books about Haiti. It was included for its exploration of the island's deep connections between history, religion, and culture, especially examining how Vodou and other religious practices have shaped Haiti's identity and historical trajectory.

Clarisse Zimra praised the work and highlighted Dayan's ability to weave together historical, legal, and spiritual narratives, noting that the book "illuminates the complexities of Vodou as a central force in Haitian life." She noted that while the book is rich in scholarly insight, its intricate exploration of legal, historical, and spiritual themes could make it "challenging to navigate" for readers unfamiliar with such depth of analysis.

Thomas O. Ott considered the book "a brilliant breakthrough in Haitian historiography." He commended Dayan for effectively capturing the Haitian psyche within its historical context and for her deep analysis of Vodou and its relationship to the colonial period. Ott did note, however, that while Dayan's treatment of some subjects, like the causes of the Leclerc expedition, was weaker, this did not diminish the overall impact of her work.

Ada Ferrer described the book as an ambitious and unconventional work, tackling complex themes such as revolution, Vodou, and colonialism. She said that Dayan does not make specific arguments but instead dramatizes a "complex and perplexing social history." Ferrer appreciated Dayan's innovative use of non-traditional historical sources, particularly Vodou rituals, which Dayan interprets as "deposits of history" that reveal insights into Haiti's past and present.

Roderick Ferguson judged it as an impressive, interdisciplinary study, praising Dayan for her detailed examination of the intersections between religion, law, and history in Haiti. Ferguson highlighted Dayan's unique approach of using Vodou as a lens to explore Haitian culture, history, and politics, noting that the book present a profound alternative interpretation of Haiti's revolutionary past. He admired Dayan's ability to link spiritual practices with historical narratives, providing fresh insights into the relationship between Vodou and the Haitian revolution.

Leslie G. Desmangles appreciated the book for its creative and unconventional approach to recounting Haiti's history. He emphasized the author's reliance on lesser-known sources like diaries, folk stories, and Vodou rituals, and praised her exploration of creolization in Haitian culture. Desmangles found the book captivating and well-documented, particularly valuing its detailed attention to the roles of women in Haitian society during and after the colonial period.

Elizabeth Colwill highlighted the book for its transformative impact on historiography, particularly its blurring of boundaries between religion, history, and politics. She noted Dayan's emphasis on Vodou as a generative force, revealing how it encodes Haiti's violent colonial past and shapes contemporary identity. Colwill praised Dayan for subverting European and Haitian nationalist mythologies, using overlooked historical figures and Vodou rituals to challenge conventional narratives of Haitian history.

Erika Bourguignon found it to be a remarkable and complex work that combines historical research with Dayan's ethnographic knowledge of Haiti. She admired Dayan's incorporation of Haitian French-language fiction and Vodou rituals to address gaps in the historical record, as it emphasized the role of gender, race, and class during the colonial and revolutionary periods. Bourguignon also noted Dayan's exploration of the zombi as a symbol of loss, dispossession, and the legacy of slavery.

Kevin Meehan stressed Dayan's detailed analysis of Haitian literature, notably her insights into Marie Vieux-Chauvet’s works, and appreciated how she brings attention to overlooked figures in Haitian history and culture. He also noted the book's rich narrative style, comparing its structure to the rhythms of Vodoun ritual.
