= Myriam J. A. Chancy =

Canadian writer (born 1970)

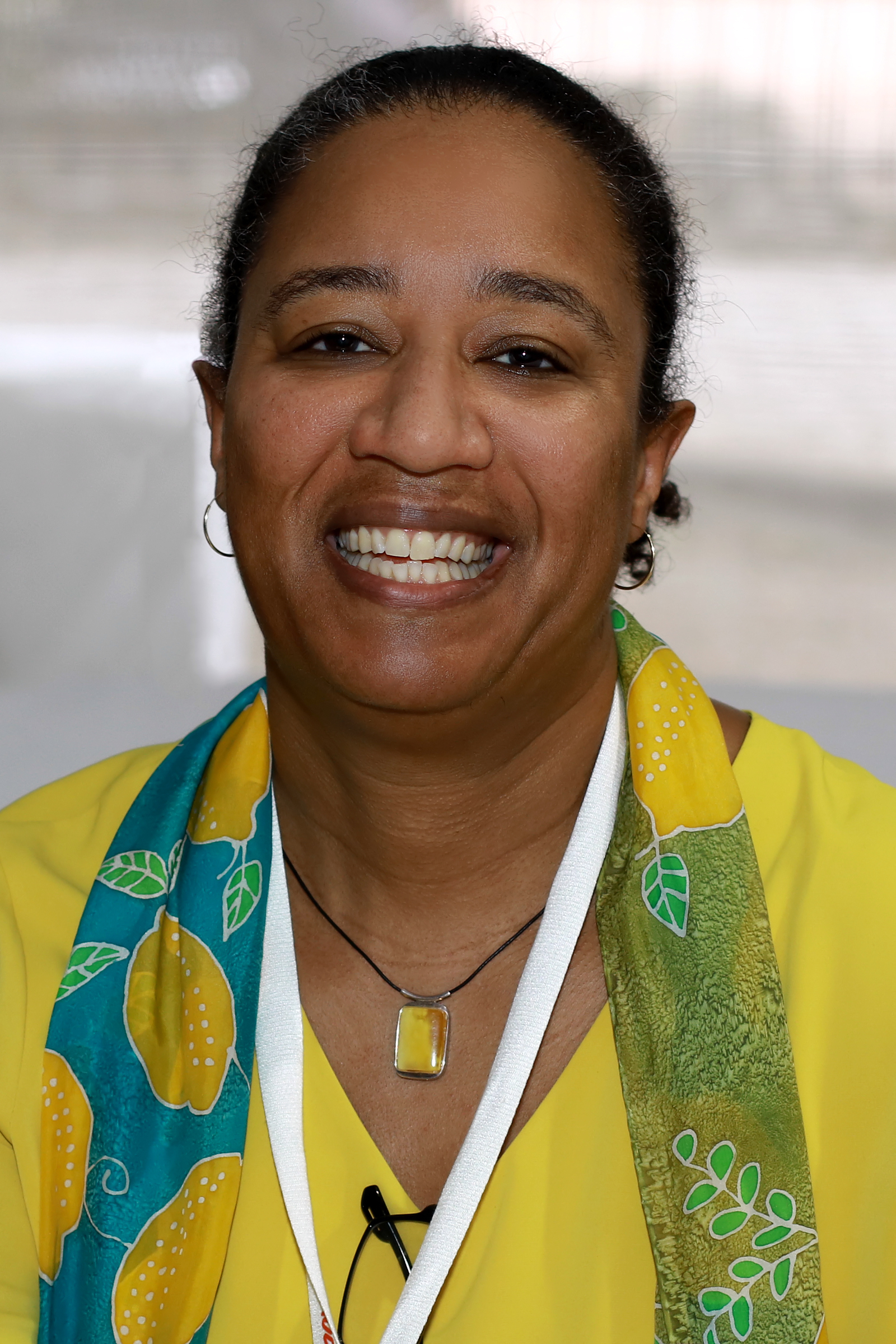
- Chancy at the 2024 Texas Book Festival.
- Born: 1970 (age 55–56); Port-au-Prince, Haiti
- Education: University of Manitoba; Dalhousie University; University of Iowa
- Occupation: Writer
- Notable work: Searching for Safe Spaces: Afro-Caribbean Women Writers in Exile (1997); Framing Silence (1997); The Loneliness of Angels (2010); Village Weavers (2024)
- Awards: Guyana Prize for Literature (2011); OCM Bocas Prize for Caribbean Literature (2025)
- Website: www.myriamjachancy.com

Myriam J. A. Chancy (born 1970) is a Haitian-Canadian-American writer and a fellow of the John Simon Guggenheim Memorial Foundation. As of 2008, she is the Hartley Burr Alexander Chair of Humanities at Scripps College of the Claremont Consortium. As a writer, she focuses on Haitian culture, gender, class, sexuality, and Caribbean women's studies. Her novels have won several awards, including the Guyana Prize for Literature Caribbean Award and the OCM Bocas Prize for Caribbean Literature.

== Early life ==
Chancy was born and raised in Port-au-Prince, Haiti, before relocating during childhood to Quebec City, Canada, and then to Winnipeg. She attended the University of Manitoba, where she received a Bachelor of Arts degree in English and Philosophy with Honors. Following that, she received her master's degree in English literature from Dalhousie University in Nova Scotia, Canada, where she wrote her thesis on "James Baldwin and the Dissolution of the Color Line". She received her Ph.D. in English at the University of Iowa in 1994.

== Career ==
Chancy has held several positions in academia over the course of her lifetime. She has taught English and Women's Studies at Vanderbilt University, at Arizona State University, and at Louisiana State University. Additionally, she has held visiting professorships at both Smith College and the University of California, Santa Barbara. She formerly taught courses in African Diaspora Studies, Caribbean Literature, Postcolonial Literature and Theory, Feminist Theory, Women's Studies, and creative writing (Fiction) at the University of Cincinnati as a Professor of English & Africana Studies. From 2002 until 2004, she served as the Editor-in-Chief of the academic arts journal Meridians: feminism, race, transnationalism, receiving the Phoenix Award for Editorial Achievement from the Council of Editors of Learned Journals. Chancy served on the editorial advisory board for the Journal of the Modern Language Association from 2010 to 2012 and on the Advisory Council in the Humanities of the Fetzer Institute from 2011 to 2013.

Spirit of Haiti (2003), her first novel, was a Commonwealth Prize finalist. It was followed by The Scorpion's Claw. Chancy's third novel, The Loneliness of Angels was the 2011 recipient of the Guyana Prize in Literature Caribbean Award for Best Fiction.

Clancy's academic work Searching for Safe Spaces: Afro-Caribbean Women Writers in Exile (1997) served as one of the first books to address exile as a defining aspect of Afro-Caribbean women's experiences. Her second 1997 book, Framing Silence, was the first book-length study devoted to Haitian women's literature as a field of analysis. Framing Silence examined six writers: Mme. Virgil Valcin, Annie Desroy, Nadine Magloire, Marie Vieux-Chauvet, Jan J. Dominique, Anne-christine d'Adesky and Edwidge Danticat. Chancy was granted early tenure on the basis of these two books.

She published From Sugar to Revolution: Women's Visions of Haiti, Cuba and the Dominican Republic in 2012 and received the prestigious Guggenheim Fellowship for Literary Criticism in 2014. In 2021, her novel on the 2010 Haiti earthquake, What Storm, What Thunder, was published by Harper Collins Canada and Tin House. It was shortlisted for the Caliba Golden Poppy Award, and the Aspen Words Literary Prize.

Her 2024 novel Village Weavers was the overall winner of the OCM Bocas Prize for Caribbean Literature.

== Literary works ==
- Searching for Safe Spaces: Afro-Caribbean Women Writers in Exile (Temple University Press, 1997)
- Framing Silence: Revolutionary Novels by Haitian Women (Rutgers University Press, 1997)
- Spirit of Haiti (London: Mango Publications, 2003)
- The Scorpion's Claw (Peepal Tree Press, 2005)
- The Loneliness of Angels (Peepal Tree Press, 2010)
- From Sugar to Revolution: Women's Visions of Haiti, Cuba and the Dominican Republic (Wilfrid Laurier University Press, 2012)
- What Storm, What Thunder (Harper Collins Canada, 2021)
- Village Weavers (Tin House, 2024)

== Awards ==
- 1998: Outstanding Academic Book Award by Choice for Searching for Safe Spaces
- 2004: Phoenix Award for Editorial Achievement from the Council of Editors of Learned Journals
- 2011: Guyana Prize in Literature Caribbean Award (Best Fiction) for The Loneliness of Angels
- 2014: John S. Guggenheim Fellowship
- 2025: Fiction winner of OCM Bocas Prize for Caribbean Literature for Village Weavers
- 2025: Overall winner of OCM Bocas Prize for Caribbean Literature
