= Annie Desroy =

Haitian novelist, playwright and teacher

Annie Desroy was the pseudonym of Anne-Marie Bourand, née Lerebours (1893-1948), a Haitian novelist, playwright and teacher. She is best known for her 1934 novel Le joug.

== Life ==
Anne-Marie Lerebours was born on May 4, 1893, in Port-au-Prince. Educated in Port-au-Prince, she became a teacher and Director of the Centre d'Etudes Universitaires, instructing girls in the first and second parts of the baccalaureate examination. She married Étienne Bourand.

She became an active member of the Ligue Féminine d'Action Sociale, and was active in the Haitian literary and cultural scene of the 1920s and 1930s. The dates of production are known for two of her plays, each a comedy in three acts: Et l'amour vient in 1921, and La cendra du passé in 1931.

Her novel Le Joug was published in an edition of only fifty copies. Myriam J. A. Chancy has praised its "complex treatment of the effects of the Occupation upon the Haitian psyche". Le Joug was apparently the first of four novels written by Desroy.

She died on October 2, 1948, in Port-au-Prince.

== Works ==
- Le joug: roman [The Yoke: a novel]. Port-au-Prince: Imp. Modèle, 1934.
