= What Storm, What Thunder =

2021 book about an earthquake in Haiti

- Author: Myriam J.A. Chancy
- Genre: Literary Fiction
- Publication date: October 5, 2021
- Pages: 336
- ISBN: 978-1951142766

What Storm, What Thunder is a novel written by American, Canadian, and Haitian professor and award-winning author Myriam J.A. Chancy. The novel was published on September 14, 2021, by Tin House Books. It was later nominated for one of the best books of 2021 by The Washington Post. Margaret Atwood characterized it as “stunning” and Edwidge Danticat called it “sublime.” Although a work of fiction, What Storm, What Thunder is based on Chancy's listening to the devastating testimonies of many Haitians whose life was forever changed by the 7.0 magnitude earthquake that hit Haiti on January 12, 2010.

As a Haitian writer, Chancy illustrates her nuanced perspective and opinion on the specificities of Haitian nationality and culture. The reader follows a non-chronological storyline that follows ten major characters trying to comprehend and unpack the 45 seconds of the earthquake whether they experienced it themselves or through the ties they have to Haiti and its people. Each chapter features one character who explains their complex life story before, during and after the natural disaster developing an intimate and devastating account of this event. Their interconnected stories form a poignant tapestry giving an insight into the reality of Haitian identity. Even though What Storm, What Thunder highlights many intense themes such as poverty, race, the impact of colonization, culture, community, religion, rebirth, and loss, it still demonstrates the immense resilience and agency of all the characters. Throughout the book, Chancy gives a historical account of the 2010 earthquake and its aftermath narrating how it affected the already impoverished Haitian population. She seeks to shows the complexity and nuance of human response to natural disasters with each relatable character responding differently to it: whether struggling with mental health, wanting to fix a mistake in their life, or yearning for Haiti and the connection to its people.

== Background ==
What Storm, What Thunder is a novel written by Myriam J. A. Chancy, a Haitian-Canadian-American writer. Inspired to tell the unheard stories of the 2010 Haiti earthquake catastrophe that devastated the island and killed hundreds of thousands of people, she demonstrates different perspectives of this unexpected event. Different characters in the story show the string of events in the aftermath of the earthquake.

The 2010 Haiti earthquake occurred at 16:53, (4:53 pm RT), on January 12, 2010. At magnitude 7.0, it was followed by at least 52 aftershocks recording at least 4.5 or greater. The earthquake caused massive destruction in Port-au-Prince Jamcel, and Léogâne. Official estimates were around 360,000 casualties. The response was led by confusion of who was in charge, lack of distribution of aid, and severe sporadic violence and looting. Hospitals necessary to aid were destroyed in the earthquake.

Chancy uses the medium of historical fiction to explore what went wrong in the aiding process, and what we as a society can learn from Haiti. Less than 1% of the 13 billion dollars donated to aid care went to the Haitian government. She depicts the violence, specifically sexual violence, that occurred, as well as specific characters that watched the disaster unfold from the outside, unable to reach family and friends. As the novel was published in 2021, it also serves a deeper purpose in showing awareness of this event. As Chancy premiered stories from the catastrophe from 2010 in What Storm, What Thunder published in 2021, the 2021 Haiti earthquake struck, making it all the more needed to shed light on the topic of the stories of Haiti just eleven years prior.

== Plot summary ==
The novel begins in the perspective of Ma Lou, a market woman working in Port-au-Prince. She discusses the loss of her mother, and her late husband, Lou. She sets the scene of the market at the time of the earthquake, or Douz, as she calls it. She is also the first to mention Jonas, a boy who would often come to get eggs for his mother, and how he was crushed during the earthquake. After the earthquake, she and the other market woman begin to rescue those that they can. The next chapter switches to the perspective of Sara, a Haitian woman, and mother to Jonas. She loves everything about her life, and her only hope is to have a bigger bed to fit all of her family together as one. The earthquake occurs, and all three of her children are crushed, with Jonas escaping, and being taken to get medical help by his father, Olivier. Sara is housed in an IDP camp, and begins to lose touch with reality due to her losses. Jonas and Oliver come back, Jonas having had his leg amputated, and eventually he dies from an infection. Olivier leaves, and Sara cannot understand why. She begins to feel the ghosts of her children tugging at her, and the chapter ends with her accidentally setting fire to her tent while trying to see her children's spirits. Chapter three follows the life of Sonia, a call-girl in Port-au-Prince, with her non romantic partner, Dieudonne. The book skips back in time to when she and Dieudonne met, and we learn that they are both queer. They begin to work together, with Sonia sleeping with wealthy men in hotels, and Dieudonne protecting her. At the time of the earthquake, they are in a hotel in Port-au-Prince, but they escape and ride through the destruction of the city together on a motorbike.

Richard, a water salesman, travels to Haiti for a business deal after his marriage in France falls apart. He has stopped talking to his mother, Ma Lou, and has never had a relationship with his daughter, Anne. The chapter ends with him being engulfed by the ocean as the earthquake begins. The perspective switches to that of Leopold, a drug trafficker and distant cousin to Dieudonne. He is trapped in an elevator for several days after the earthquake, and takes the time to recount where he has done wrong in life. When he is freed, he travels back to where his mother and daughter live, and makes changes in his life to become a “better man”. Taffia, a teenage girl living in Port-au-Prince begins talking about her life at school, and the girls she is friends with. She goes to a dance club with her friends, but is soon lost in the crowd and confronted by a boy in her school, Junior, who attempts to sexually intimidate her. She declines, and is pulled out of the club by Sonia, her sister. After the earthquake, Junior finds her in the camp, and rapes her. She becomes pregnant, and the chapter ends at the time of the fire caused by Sara.

The story picks up in Boston with Dieder, Sonia and Taffia's brother, who drives cabs. He discusses how he has become religious and his love of dogs. In the past, he was beat up for being black in a “white” area of Boston. As he is picking up a girl to have sex with, he hears about the earthquake on the cab's radio. They go back to the girl's apartment, where Didier watches the news and looks online for information. The two have sex, and Didier continues to use her computer to get the news.

The book cuts to Olivier, husband of Sara, in Camp Cocasse, an alternate IDP camp away from Port-au-Prince. He explains that he left due to promises that the new camp would have shelter and funds for any that went, which he has not received. He begins patrolling the camp at night with other men to attempt to stop sexual violence. As he walks, he is surrounded by men and raped. A man on patrol interrupts and attempts to help, but Olivier runs in front of a truck and is killed.

In Rwanda, Anne hears of the earthquake through the newspaper. She begins networking to connect people that she knows in Haiti, and reaches her Grandmother, Ma Lou. She returns to Haiti six months after the earthquake and lives with Ma Lou. She finds it difficult to stay in Haiti, and leaves on the advice of Ma Lou. The next chapter is from the perspective of Jonas, a young boy who has appeared in everyone's lives throughout the book. He recounts his life and death, as well as feeling close to his mother, Sara, after his death.

The final chapter circles back to Ma Lou far after the earthquake. When she hears that the cemetery in which her husband is buried is going to be moved, she digs up the bones of his bones and is caught by the police. On trial, she begs to be allowed to keep them after so much loss, and wins. Anne comes back to Haiti, and she and Ma Lou plan to move to a piece of land left to Ma Lou by her mother. They decide to take Taffia and her son, as well as Sara, with them. Sonia decides to come as well, and the book ends with the group going to Saint d’Eau.

== Characters ==
=== Ma Lou ===
Ma Lou opens and closes the book from her perspective and serves as an almost all-knowing narrator. She, a Christian, was married to a man named Lou, a Voodooist, and has a son named Richard. She called her husband “My Lou”, giving her the nickname Ma Lou. Richard and Ma Lou stopped talking until she found that Richard had a child with a woman named Anne. Ma Lou works in the marketplace in Port-au-Prince and works to rescue those she can as she is there when the Earthquake hits. After her son Richard's death, she, Anne, and others go to Saint d’Eau, a place where her mother left her land. Throughout the novel's journey, she struggles to face the immense loss that has plagued her life because of the Earthquake.

=== Jonas ===
The son of Sara, Jonas helps out Ma Lou and other market women collecting eggs and running errands for other people around him. He was saved from rubble in the earthquake and got his leg amputated, yet died in the following weeks. His character works to advance the plot through his leg and consequently, his death, which affects other characters throughout the novel, such as his father Olivier. He serves as a line drawn between the living world and the dead, as there is a Haitian belief that there is no division between the living and the dead. His haunting presence is a reminder that there is someone who is between worlds and can bring joy to the living.

== Major Themes ==
=== Rebirth ===
The plot of What Storm, What Thunder follows a series of characters that converse through a journey of self-reflection and come to an epiphany and reconsider their values and morals as people mere seconds before the earthquake hits Haiti and often die after their moment of self-analysis. This is true in the case of Richard, who was written to be arrogant with wealth and status. He had originally been living in Haiti and learned to differentiate between grades of purity when it came to water due to the fact that his family had to boil water in order to make it safe to drink. This led him to develop his own water company out of the thirst for money rather than aiding the Haitian population and attempting to provide them with healthy and affordable water. Upon being faced with a divorce, he returns to Haiti to reassess himself. After reconnecting with his daughter whom he had left behind in Haiti, he finds himself engulfed in water. This ties into the symbolism of water illustrated throughout the novel, taking a nuanced form in the case of Richard, who was unable to redeem himself although he wanted to. Water became his source of reinvention as he was able to travel to Europe and create a new identity for himself. The same tsunami that engulfed him became the catalyst for the rebirth of the island. For Ma Lou, the death of Richard and countless other loved ones causes her to rethink her belief in the god she devoutly followed. Leopold also went through a process of rebirth as his entrapment within the elevator caused him to look into himself and seek forgiveness in regard to his past as well as ask for a second chance for the future. After he is rescued, he moves back to his family, stops selling drugs, becomes vegetarian, and begins a closer relationship with his daughter. For Oliver, the tragedy of losing his loved ones to the disaster causes him to leave Port-au-Prince and seek a new path in life, although this ultimately leads to his rape and suicide.

=== Loss and community ===
The novel also deals with themes of loss and the destruction of the Haitian community. The opening of the book follows Ma Lou describing her mother's illness and death. Her mother continued to repeat that she has no bones, a common symbol explored throughout the novel. Ma Lou deals with the loss of her son Richard in the earthquake, as well as the neighbor boy Jonas and his siblings. She reflects on how losing her mother is not unlike the loss of her husband and community to the earthquake. For Richard, his daughter's mother's death sparks a trip to Haiti which eventually leads to his own death; he never attended Anne's mother's funeral. In Taffia's chapter, the chaos and distress of the Haitian community as well as the loss of her close friend Tatie is illustrated. Taffia's chapter follows her on her way to meet up with a friend and watch her favorite show, this mundane activity quickly turns into moments of confusion and worry as the earthquake hits, filling the air with dust. Taffie and her brother Paul attempt to find their friend Tatie but she is gone. Upon returning home, they find their father in a state of dismay and their community seeking loved ones, the entire island a pile of rubble with its people attempting to pull others out of the piles of rock. Didier's chapter explores the idea of being black in America and the difficulty he faced in regard to assimilating into American culture and community. He finds that he is not welcome despite his efforts, even turning to Christianity in hope of it helping his feelings of despair. However, he finds that he is still an outsider. Similarly to Ma Lou, Oliver also reflects on the innocent lives lost due to the earthquake. He finds it hard to reconcile with these deaths, including that of his children. He comments on how he knew something bad was going to happen. The death of his daughters calls into question how he could remain in Port-au-Prince. He leaves Haiti behind with only a letter of goodbye, and continues to lose himself more in the other camp.

=== Sexuality and sexual trauma ===
Sex and sexuality is not shied away from in this novel, but is often non consensual or stigmatized. Reviewers have applauded Chancy's ability to keep the book hopeful while discussing sexual harassment and rape in IDP camps. Sonia and Dieudonne reveal to each other that they are queer through a code, stating that they are "M." Later on, members of Sonia's family imply that they are aware that she is a sex worker, but never attempt to talk about it or reference the profession. Chancy believes that these taboos remain specifically on Caribbean women's sexuality is due to the gender roles present in the Caribbean. On top of the lack of discussion on sexuality and sex work, rape is also a large issue in the story. In the two months after the earthquake, 230 rapes were reported in 15 camps through Port-au-Prince. There were over 500 camps, lacking privacy, security, and resources for people experiencing sexual violence. Chancy touches on these issues throughout the novel, with the story of Olivier and Taffia. Olivier, who was aware of the sexual assaults occurring in the camps, attempted to fight against them. However, this led to him being raped, and was ultimately the motivation for his suicide.

== Style ==
Chancy's decision to have one character per chapter and to have each character written through their own voice and point of view creates an intimate connection between the reader and the characters. The combined narrations of the different intersecting characters throughout the book add many different angles from which the reader can perceive and learn about each character. This way of narration also creates a very realistic world where characters are nuanced and complex. Her choice of easy language adds to her trying to create an everyday and realistic account accessible to a large audience. Her multi-racial and multicultural identity is expressed in her style of writing; her use of Creole expressions or sentences throughout the book, and her references to Voodoo, as well as Catholicism, immerse the reader into the richness and diversity of Haitian culture and its complex relationship with its traumatic colonial past. Chancy's choice to have a non-chronological storyline builds ambiguity and suspense; she leaves details unsaid and fills the reader in throughout the book creating many unexpected epiphany moments in the reader's mind. Chancy's capability to show the island of Haiti destroyed and impoverished by the earthquake in such a cinematographic way yet experiencing it through the eyes of diverse and highly relatable characters builds an unavoidable empathy within the reader, making them unable to look away from the horror and poignancy of the moment.
