= With Dogs at the Edge of Life =

Book on human-animal relationships

- Cover
- Author: Colin Dayan
- Language: English
- Subject: Human-animal relationships, ethics, animal studies
- Genre: Non-fiction
- Publisher: Columbia University Press
- Publication date: December 2015
- Publication place: United States
- Media type: Hardcover
- Pages: 208
- ISBN: 9780231167123
- Preceded by: The Law Is a White Dog (2011)

With Dogs at the Edge of Life is a book by American legal scholar and academic Colin Dayan, published by Columbia University Press in 2015. The book tackles the complex relationships between humans and dogs, and explores the themes of ethics, politics, and trans-species engagement. Drawing on memoirs, case law, and film, Dayan investigates the shared histories and struggles of dogs and humans, challenging established views of liberal humanism and offering new perspectives on suffering, violence, and empathy. By following the lives of dogs in different global contexts, the book rethinks how we live alongside non-human animals in the 21st century.

== Summary ==
The book is a philosophical and memoiristic exploration of the human-animal relationship, focusing on dogs. It is divided into three main sections, each addressing different aspects of the human-canine bond, law, and society's treatment of dogs.

The first section, Like a Dog, blends Dayan's personal memoir with reflections on how dogs and humans interact. It incorporates her experiences growing up in the racially charged South and her connection with dogs during that time. Dayan examines the emotional, physical, and spiritual ties between humans and dogs, and she emphasizes the capacity of dogs to challenge the boundaries between the mental and the physical.

The second section, When Law Comes to Visit, addresses how legal frameworks and institutions, such as humane societies, interact with and sometimes fail both dogs and their owners. This section focuses on high-profile cases, including the wrongful targeting of individuals for dogfighting based on breed stereotypes, such as the 2005 case of Floyd Boudreaux, whose pit bulls were euthanized despite his acquittal. Dayan critiques the legal and societal handling of dogs, especially pit bulls, exposing the contradictions in the way they are treated as both companions and potential threats.

In the final section, Pariah Dogs, Dayan explores the depiction of stray dogs in global cinema and cultural practices, highlighting the often brutal treatment of street dogs in cities like Istanbul and Ulaanbaatar. She links these portrayals to broader social and political themes, questioning the boundaries between human and non-human animals and their rights to life and dignity.

== Reviews ==
In her review, Susan Bulanda noted the personal, memoiristic touch of the author drawing on her background and upbringing growing up in Atlanta in the 1950s and 60s. Bulanda described, for instance, the first part of the book as a "very intimate account of the author's childhood and her relationships with her dogs". The reviewer judged the work to be well-researched noting that Dayan's love for dogs (and for pit bulls specifically) "shines through". She wrote: "To a dog lover, this is a heartbreaking volume to read but illustrate prejudice and the justification people use for their actions."

Campbell Johnston Birch thought the book is "evocative and frequently poetic", and commended Dayan for blending memoir, legal analysis, and cultural critique. Birch praised the exploration of these themes but noted what he thought its unsettling nature, especially in sections addressing uncomfortable topics like dog profiling and the comparison between racial and animal existence. As Birch put it, Dayan "hopes to critique what so often goes by the name of civility, reasonableness, and progress." Birch also mentioned that the book's non-linear structure and its refusal to adhere to conventional academic form may challenge some readers. The reviewer stressed how the book engages with Derrida's ideas from The Animal That Therefore I Am by extending his critique of the human-animal distinction. Dayan, says Birch, goes beyond Derrida's work by exploring the affective and nonhuman perspectives that arise from the interactions between species.

American writer Maria Browning stressed Dayan's passionate and unconventional empathy for dogs, and how she examines legal and ethical issues surrounding their treatment. Browning cautioned that some readers might be uncomfortable with Dayan's somewhat blunt style, especially when she critiques practices that are widely accepted as humane, stating, "Executing animals while ‘speaking the language of salvation’ is evil as well as absurd." Despite its challenging content, Browning found the book thought-provoking and emotionally compelling.

Philosopher and theologian Beatrice Marovitch found the book a profound and unsettling work that pushes readers to rethink both spiritual and ethical assumptions. She appreciated how Dayan challenges conventional certainties, especially around animal rights and the human-animal relationship, by questioning boundaries between the physical and spiritual, noting how the book "queries the strange combination of pain and beauty in the fact of being alive." To Marovich the book was intellectually provocative, as she described it as one that raises more questions than answers and leaves readers in a productive state of uncertainty.

Scott McLemee lauded the author for the genre-defying exploration of the complex relationship between humans and dogs. He admired Dayan's ability to weave together metaphysical insights and social commentary, particularly on issues like the demonization of pit bulls and their connection to marginalized groups. McLemee found the book intellectually stimulating, noting that it challenged conventional boundaries and offered a memorable, thought-provoking read.
