= Antoine Dupré =

Haitian poet, songwriter and playwright

- Born: 1782; Cap-Haïtien
- Died: January 13, 1816 (aged 33–34)
- Cause of death: Killed in a duel

Antoine Dupré (1782–1816) was an early Haitian poet, songwriter, and playwright. He was one of the first published poets and one of the first performed playwrights of independent Haiti. He is known for his historical works, such as the poems Hymne à la Liberté and Le Rêve d'un Haytien, and the plays La Mort du Général Lamarre and La Jeune Fille. Much is unknown about his life, including his date of birth. According to his own account, he spent time in England, where he began a theatrical career, but was not well received by the public. It is likely that like other writers of his generation (the pioneers) he studied in France. In 1810, he was seen at the Môle-Saint-Nicolas with Hérard Dumesle, and later in Port-au-Prince when Henri Christophe was commanding the city, Dupré was in the front row, encouraging the youth with patriotic songs. Dupré was killed in a duel at about 34 years of age.

== List of Works ==
Semexan Rouzier claimed that in 1844, the various poems and plays of Antoine Dupré were published and collected in a single volume. However, his works are currently lost. All that remains of his works are a few verses and his three plays also have no surviving copies.

- "Un hymne à la liberté (1812)" (A Hymn to Freedom)
- "La jeune fille (comedy)" (The Young Girl)
- "Le miroir" (The Mirror)
- "La mort du général Lamarre (drame)" (The Death of General Lamarre)
- "Le rêve d'un Haïtien." (A Haitian's Dream)
- "Vers pour être gravés au bas d'un buste de Pétion." (Verses to be Engraved at the Bottom of Pétion's Bust)
