= Dictionary of Caribbean and Afro–Latin American Biography =

Dictionary of biographies of Caribbean and Afro–Latin American people

- Editor: Franklin W. Knight; Henry Louis Gates, Jr
- Language: English
- Genre: Biographical dictionary
- Publisher: Oxford University Press
- Publication date: 2016
- ISBN: 978-0-199-93579-6

The Dictionary of Caribbean and Afro–Latin American Biography (DCALAB) is a six-volume, 2080-entry biographical dictionary that was published in May 2016 by Oxford University Press. The project was funded by the Mellon Foundation. The editors were Franklin W. Knight and Henry Louis Gates Jr.

Described by Ben Vinson III as a "remarkable feat of scholarship", coverage begins in 1492, and all Latin American and Caribbean countries and territories are included. To ensure this broad coverage, a call-out was made across the region for subjects to include. Librarian Jessica Lewis described how the dictionary will be "a core resource for libraries in nations with African heritage".
