= Jean Fouchard =

Haitian historian, journalist and diplomat

Jean Fouchard (Port au Prince, 2 March 1912 - ibidem, 30 September 1990) was a Haitian historian, journalist, and diplomat. Fouchard was born in Port-au-Prince and earned a law degree there. He worked as a journalist, founding the periodical La Relèvé, and as a diplomat, serving as the ambassador to Cuba. He is best known for his historical publications.

== Selected works ==
- Les Marrons du Syllabaire (1953)
- Plaisirs de Saint-Domingue (1955)
- Le Théâtre à Saint-Domingue (1955)
- Artistes et Répertoires des Scènes de Saint-Domingue (1955)
- Les Marrons de la Liberté (1972). English translation: The Haitian Maroons: Liberty or Death (1981), with a preface by C. L. R. James
- Langue et Littérature des Aborigènes d'Ayiti (1972)
