= Jean Métellus =

- Born: 30 April 1937; Jacmel, Haiti
- Died: 4 January 2014 (aged 76)
- Occupations: Doctor; Poet; Novelist; Playwright

Jean Métellus (30 April 1937 - 4 January 2014) was a Haitian neurologist, poet, novelist and playwright.

Jean Métellus was born in Jacmel, Haiti. After completing his education in Haiti, he worked as a teacher. In 1959 he moved to Paris to escape the Duvalier dictatorship, where he studied linguistics and medicine, specializing in neurology. In 1973 the magazine Les Lettres Nouvelles published his poem "Au pipirite chantant," beginning his career as a poet and writer. Some of Métellus's early poems were also published by Jean-Paul Sartre in his Les Temps Modernes. Métellus' plays include Anacaona, which was produced in Paris at the Thèâtre National de Chaillot by Antoine Vitez.

Métellus published several novels, books of poetry and plays. In 2019, Haun Saussy translated a collection of Métellus's poetry titled When the Pipirite Sings: Selected Poems, which was published by Northwestern University Press. Métellus dedicated his books to his wife, Anne-Marie Cercelet-Métellus.

He died on January 4, 2014.
