= Cléante Valcin =

Haitian feminist activist and writer

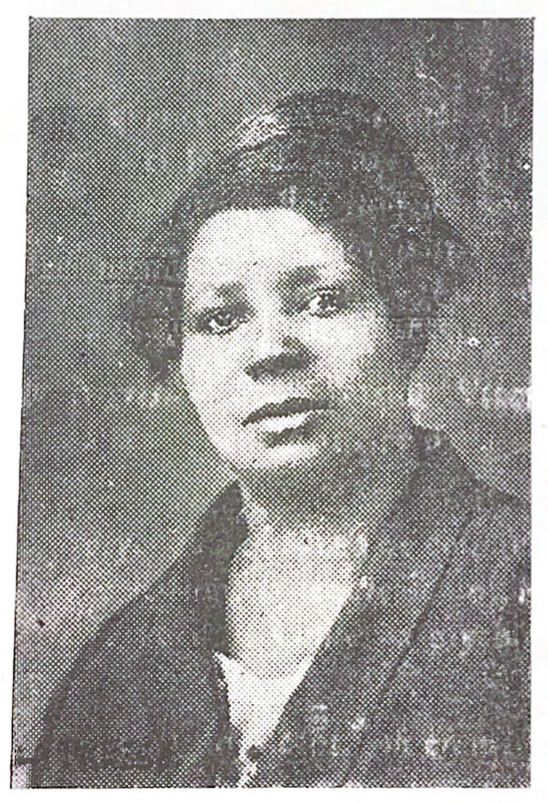
- Picture included in the original 1934 edition of La Blanche Négresse
- Born: Cléante Desgraves; January 13, 1891; Port-Au-Prince, Haiti
- Died: January 26, 1956 (aged 65)
- Education: Pensionnat des Demoiselles under the writer Virginie Sampeur
- Occupations: Teacher until 1917, author, journalist
- Spouse: Virgile Valcin (m. 1917)
- Children: 3, Charles, Célie Marie Alice and Yolande
- Writing career
- Pen name: Mme Virgile Valcin, Cléanthe Valcin, Cléante Desgraves, Cléante Desgraves Valcin
- Language: French & Kréol
- Notable works: Fleurs et Pleurs (1924), Cruelle Destinée (1929), La Blanche Négresse (1934)

Cléante Desgraves Valcin (January 13, 1891 – January 26, 1956) was a Haitian feminist activist and writer. A founding member of the Ligue Féminine d'Action Sociale (The Feminine League of Social Action), she is credited with having published the first novel written by a Haitian woman, Cruelle Destinée, in 1929.

== Personal life ==
Cléante Desgraves was born on January 13, 1891, in Port-au-Prince to Hector Desgraves, a Haitian pharmacist and pianist, and Alice Cunningham, an American citizen. Throughout her childhood, she attended a girl's boarding school in Port-au-Prince which was directed by the teacher, writer, and poet Virginie Sampeur. Cléante was a teacher until her marriage in 1917 to Virgile Valcin (born 1885) who owned a government-affiliated printing press. A year later, in 1918, her first child, Charles Valcin (1918-1997) was born. She also had two daughters, Célie Marie Alice, born in 1920 (died in 1921) and Yolande, born in 1922.

== Career ==
=== Activism, political, and professional engagement ===
Valcin worked in her father's pharmacy during her early life. However, her adult life mostly consisted of authorship and advocacy work. Her first published work, a selection of poems entitled Fleurs et Pleurs published in 1924, marks the beginning of her writing career, intersecting with her time as part of the Ligue Féminine d'Action Sociale, a feminist group in Haiti focused on women's rights. In 1935 Valcin co-founded the feminist journal Voix des femmes (Voice of women). The journal was also the voice of La Ligue Féminine d’Action Sociale, the first feminist organization of Haiti.

Valcin represented Haiti at a number of international congresses and was considered a champion of women's rights. Valcin was president of the Ligue Féminine d'Action Sociale at the time of her death. Throughout her life, Valcin put her skills to work for the feminist cause and wrote many features in the book Femmes Haïtiennes (Haitian Women), which was published by the Ligue Féminine d’Action Sociale in 1953. Additionally, in 1955, she represented the Haitian government in Puerto Rico for the 10th Assembly of Women and acted as the chair for her delegation.

=== Literary ===
==== Cruelle Destinée ====
Valcin's first novel, Cruelle Destinée (1929), tells the story of a family torn apart by bankruptcy, illness, and shame. The ensuing romantic saga deals with the tension between love and immorality in the context of Haitian high society.

The novel begins with a letter explaining the reasons for Julien Rougerot's recent disappearance. The missing man exposes the secrets of his bankruptcy to Junie Rougerot, his pregnant wife, and their two daughters, Madeleine and Jane. Distraught at Julien Rougerot's sudden departure and the severity of his debt, the Rougerots reach a state of emotional volatility that causes them to cry, shout, and even pass out. Their suddenly dismal financial outlooks drive the Rougerots to sell all of their possessions and retreat to a country house owned by their kind neighbors, the Dubourgs. Although the Dubourgs opened their home and their pockets to the Rougerots, when Madame Dubourg dies of a sudden illness, the bereaved Monsieur Dubourg resolves to leave Haiti. To give her the means to provide for herself, he arranges an opportunity for Junie to run a shop, and she begins to work there to pay off the debts accrued by her husband.

On Christmas Day, Junie gives birth to a baby boy, Armand, and, a few months later, becomes pregnant out of wedlock and gives birth to a baby girl, who, aside from the placeholder “Bébé,” is never named. A stroke of misery coupled with physical illness weakens Junie, whose declining business has made it difficult to provide for herself and the two little ones. Madeleine and Jane return from boarding school with a letter from their father, who announces that his business efforts abroad had been successful and that he can finally return to his family. By the time he returns, Junie's newborn child, born out of wedlock, has disappeared, and illness has taken Junie's life. Though the couple never reunite, Julien is determined to make up for lost time and provide for Madeleine, Jane, and Armand.

Madeleine and Jane finish their studies at a boarding school where they meet Adeline Renaudy, a beautiful yet vain young girl who grows close to the sisters. For her sixteenth birthday, Adeline is gifted a voyage to Paris, where she meets the now-grown Armand Rougerot. During their brief encounter, they fall madly in love, and end up engaged just the day before Adeline is set to return to Haiti, while Armand must stay in Paris to pass his exams to become a lawyer. While reluctant to give their blessings for their children to marry so hurriedly, both Armand's father and Adeline's parents finally acquiesce to the pressures of young love. One of Adeline's cousins, Louise Guitton, is revealed to also be in love with Armand. Around this time, Adeline discovers a worrying family secret: she is Bébé, the secret daughter of Junie Rougerot, and therefore the half-sister of her betrothed. An incestuous love triangle binds Armand, Louise, and Adeline — who, unable to live with the secret of her true origins, breaks off her engagement to Armand and decides to flee to Paris, where she changes her name to Claire Closebourg. She finds employment as a governess and grows close to M. Gaston Durieu, who reveals he is her father. Adeline returns to Port-au-Prince, falls ill, and wishes to die to atone for her sins. Her dying wish is that Armand marry Louise, and after Adeline dies, he does.

==== La Blanche Négresse ====
Valcin's second novel, La Blanche Négresse (1934), is a work of political fiction set during the American occupation of Haiti. Dealing boldly with issues of Haitian liberation, Western colonialism, and the social woes left in their wake, it tells the intertwined stories of several Americans, French, and Haitians living less-than harmoniously.

The novel follows the lives of Raoul and his daughter Laurence after a complicated childbirth forces Raoul to raise the newborn Laurence alone. Years later, Raoul marries a woman named Luccine, but they struggle financially and eventually move from France to Haiti in an attempt to start anew. The family is pleasantly surprised by the quality of lifestyle on the island; Laurence is immediately enamored by a lawyer named Guy Vanel, and the family quickly and easily fall comfortably into place in Haiti. Raoul forms a gentleman's club for intellectuals including Guy Vanel and a well-off American named Robert Watson, who has also taken a liking to Laurence.

For practical and financial reasons, Laurence is forced to marry the unpleasant and conceited Robert Watson, and the ensuing marriage is very unhappy, as Robert displays aggression towards Laurence, who continues to hold feelings for Guy. The dynamic shifts when Guy visits Laurence while Robert is away, they have an altercation, and she falls ill. Upon his return, Robert helps nurse her back to health and the couple reconciles. Laurence later gives birth to a daughter, Eveline. A loving relationship grows between Eveline and her father. Their bond is so close that Laurence, out of concern for Eveline, cautions Robert not to spoil the child, but Robert insists that he only wants to see his only child happy.

At a high-society party for one of the members of the gentlemen's club, Laurence receives an envelope. In it, there is a letter informing her that she has earned an inheritance from her late mother's great-uncle. Everyone begins to celebrate until they see that along with the letter, there is a photo of the great-uncle; to everyone's disgust, he is African-American. The revelation shocks Robert, a white American concerned with how the revelation of his miscegenation will impact his reputation. Robert cannot accept her ancestry and suggests that while they must divorce, they can still see one another in secret. Laurence, who wants to be loved openly despite her ancestry, declines. She inherits the fortune and leaves Robert to raise Eveline on her own. Robert, who cannot stand the heartbreak, takes his own life.

== Main themes ==
Most of Valcin's literary themes focused on current events at the time of her writing, especially as Haiti was under American occupation. Haiti's long history of colonization and foreign occupation, racism, classism, colorism, slavery, and nationality are all prevalent themes in Valcin's works, alongside feminism, the institution of marriage, family, and religion, which tend to air on the more domestic parts of the household.

Cruelle Destinée heavily focuses on the American occupation of Haiti, and its influence over how Haitians viewed France. Its purposeful lack of description on the physical appearances of its characters in such a detail-saturated novel when it talks heavily about class leans into themes of colorism, especially as there was a prevalent racial hierarchy in relation to class and social status. Its subtlety in talking about the beauty of its characters while omitting their skin color is a strong reversal of other literary works at the time. American occupation tended to infantilize Haitians, proclaiming itself as the "big brother" stepping in for the errors of France, which was painted as a "bad parent" figure to Haiti. In filling these roles with characters whose relations to one another change their viewpoints, Valcin includes more complicated themes of occupation and nationalism, especially by at the end advocating for continuing relations with France over the United States by having the protagonist, Adeline, choose to stay with her father over marrying her brother.

== Awards and recognition ==
In June 1955, just a year before her death, Cléante received the key to the city of San JJuan, Puerto Rico for her work at 10th General Assembly of Women during which she led the delegation as well as acted as a representative of her home country, Haiti.
