= Jan J. Dominique =

Haiti writer (born 1953)

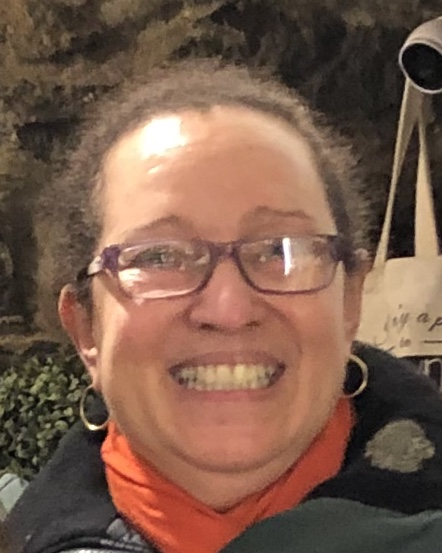
- Jan J. Dominique in Quebec in 2019
- Born: January 25, 1953 (age 72); Port-au-Prince, Haiti
- Occupation: Author

Jan J. Dominique (born January 25, 1953, in Port-au-Prince, Haiti) is a Canadian writer, journalist, radio host, and teacher from Haiti.

== Biography ==
Jan J. Dominique was born in Port-au-Prince, Haiti in 1953. She started writing stories and poems at the age of 12. She moved to Quebec, Canada in 1970, where she completed a Master's degree in literature and art history and then worked for a trade union in Montreal. In 1978, Dominique returned to Haiti, where she worked in education, teaching at high school and university level, and contributing towards an educational reform project with the National Institute for Pedagogy. Dominique began a career in journalism because her father, Jean Dominique was also a journalist and owned a radio station. She worked at Radio Haiti alongside her teaching career until 1980, when the Haitian government closed the station, forcing journalists into exile, including her father. In 1986, Radio Haiti reopened, and Dominique left teaching to work there full-time until its closure in 2003.

Dominique published her first novel, Memoir of an Amnesiac in 1984. The novel tells the story of a young girl growing up under the dictatorial regime in Haiti and tackles themes of identity, memory, women's writing, and the role of literature. Dominique submitted the novel to a Haitian literary competition and won the 1984 edition of the Prix Deschamps, allowing Memoir to be published. Major themes in Dominique's work include escape and confronting personal and social realities. Her writing often contains autobiographical elements, but Dominique rejects labels of genre, preferring to define her work simply as 'literature'.

After the assassination of her father in 2000, Dominique left Haiti and settled permanently in Montreal, where she worked on rewriting and republishing her works which were originally published in Haiti. Her memoir, Wandering Memory, published in 2008 is an elegy to her father following his death and traces Dominique's life and exile after tragedy, as well as the injustices faced in Haiti.

Her latest novel, L'écho de leurs voix, released in 2016, tells the story of Haitian immigrants in Montreal.

== Bibliography ==
- Memoir of an Amnesiac (Mémoire d'une amnésique) (1984)
- Évasion (1996)
- Inventer... La Célestine (2000)
- Wandering Memory (Mémoire errante) (2008)
- L'écho de leurs voix (2016)
