= Virginie Sampeur =

Haitian educator and poet (1839–1919)

Marie Angelique Virginie Sampeur (1839–1919) was a Haitian educator and poet. She is "credited with being the first Haitian woman writer".

Sampeur's poems were published in Haitian literary journals, La Ronde (1898–1902) and Haiti Littéraire et Scientifique (1912–13).

Sampeur married and divorced the poet Oswald Durand. By a later marriage, she was the mother of the classical musician Ludovic Lamothe.
