= Juste Chanlatte =

Haitian editor, journalist, poet, playwright and count

Juste Chanlatte, Comte de Rosier (1766–1828) was a Haitian editor, journalist, poet, playwright and a count. He served as secretary to King Henri I of the Kingdom of Haiti with the noble title of Comte de Rosier. Chanlatte was born in Port-au-Prince and educated in France. He wrote for La Gazette du Cap and later was the editor of the official government publication under President Jean-Pierre Boyer, le Télégraphe.

== Selected works ==
- "Hayti reconnaissante" (1819)
- Ode à l'Indépendance (1821)
- Cantate à l'Indépendance (1821)
- La Triple Palme (1822)
- Le Naufrage de "l'Alexandre"

== Sources ==
- Schutt-Ainé, Patricia (1994). Haiti: A Basic Reference Book. Miami, Florida: Librairie Au Service de la Culture. p. 88. ISBN 0-9638599-0-0.
- Kadish, Doris Y. (2015). Poetry of Haitian Independence. Yale University Press. p. 112. ISBN 978-0-300-19559-0.
