= Massillon Coicou =

Haitian politician and writer

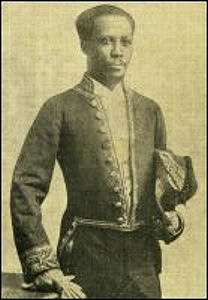
Massillon Coicou.

Massillon Coicou (Haitian Creole: Masiyon Kwakou, 9 October 1867 – 15 March 1908) was a Haitian poet, novelist, playwright, and politician. Born in Port-au-Prince, Coicou was educated in a Catholic school for boys. He was appointed as the Haitian Chargé d'Affaires Étrangères for the Haitian Republic in France, where several of his works were published. Opposed to the presidency of Pierre Nord Alexis, Coicou publicly announced his intentions to overthrow Nord Alexis' government. He and his two brothers were subsequently executed by the President's orders on the night of 14–15 March 1908.

== Major works ==
=== Poésies Nationales ===
Published in 1892 in Paris by V. Goupy et Jourdan, Massillon Coicou's first collection of poetry earned him the nickname the "barde nationale," particularly because the collection features an exhaustive number of poems dedicated to Haitian national heroes such as Toussaint Louverture, Jean-Jacques Dessalines, Henri Christophe, and Alexandre Pétion, among others. Critic, historian, and bibliophile Hénock Trouillot heralded Poésies Nationales saying that this series of poetry "showed more maturity" than his 1903 collections Impressions and Passions, a maturity that would "ultimately lead him to write L'Oracle and L'Empereur Dessalines.

=== L'Empereur Dessalines ===
Apart from his poetry, Massillon Coicou was a well known playwright. As the former director of the group L’Association du Centenaire de l'Indépendance Nationale, Coicou created the Théâtre National Haïtien to which he was an active contributor.

His play L'Empereur Dessalines was first performed on October 7, 1906 to commemorate the centenary of the assassination of Jean-Jacques Dessalines who was murdered by his compatriots on October 17, 1806 at Pont-Rouge near Port-au-Prince. The play tells the story of Dessalines' death, the plot to murder him, and the fractured Haitian state that came as a result of the fall of the first empire. The published edition of the play only features a preface and act one, the second act has never been recovered.

==== Preface to L'Empereur Dessalines ====
In the preface to his most well-known and only printed play, Massillon Coicou argues that the assassination of Emperor Dessalines is the first sin of Haitian independence, the ultimate crime against the Haitian people. Coicou continues to pay homage to Défilée Dédée Bazile known colloquially as "Défilée la Folle," insisting that by collecting the remains of Dessalines' mutilated body that she represents the ultimate embodiment of Haitian patriotism. The preface to L'Empereur Dessalines has been extensively referenced by both Colin Dayan and Jana Evans Braziel in their writing about Défilée.

==== Act One ====
The first act of L’Empereur Dessalines is set around the same royal ball where Dessalines professes his desire for Alexandre Pétion to marry his daughter Célimène in order to create a union between black Haitians and the mulattoes. However, in Coicou's play, Pétion and Henry Christophe spend little time discussing the parameters of this possible union, instead they conspire to assassinate Dessalines. After having learned of Pétion's seditious plans, Dessalines pledges to no longer merely be the father of Haitian independence, nor the country's leader, but its master. Henry Christophe placates Dessalines playing the role of the double agent, forcing Pétion and Gérin to confess to their treacherous plot - even though it was Pétion and Christophe's plan from the beginning. Dessalines ultimately accepts Christophe's “wise” proposal because if he executed the two responsible for the conspiracy the Haitian elite would blame Dessalines for their deaths. In Coicou's formulation of the Pont Rouge story, Dessalines is the Christ-like figure and Christophe is the proverbial Judas Iscariot. The first act ends with Dessalines riding off to the South to quell the civil war that has allegedly broken out.

==== Act Two ====
Although act two of Coicou's play is unpublished, it presumably recounts Dessalines' assassination, dismemberment, and his burial by Défilée Bazile. The following paragraph is a description of Défilée's intervention by Beaubrun Ardoiun in his Etudes sur l'histoire d'Haïti:

"This inanimate body, mutilated, pierced by so many blows to the head, was barely recognizable. It remained exposed at the place d’armes until the afternoon when a black woman, named Défilée – long considered mad – benefitted from a lucid moment or, rather, was moved by sentiments of compassion, moaned alone before the remains of the Founder of Independence and, after the soldiers had come, by order of General Pétion, to remove them and carry them to the cemetery, spread flowers over the pit that held the scraps of Dessalines. A few years later, Madame Inginac erected a modest headstone on which featured the following inscription: “Here lies Dessalines, dead at the age of 48.”'

== Selected works ==
- Poésies Nationales (poems, published 1892)
- Complaintes d'Esclave (poem)
- Vertières (poem)
- Impressions (poems, published 1903)
- Passions (poems, published 1903)
- Liberté (drama, published 1904)
- L'Alphabet (drama, published 1905)
- La Noire (serial novel, published 1905, unfinished)
- L'Empereur Dessalines, Drame en deux actes, en vers (drama, published 1907)
