= François-Romain Lhérisson =

François-Romain Lhérisson (c. 1798–1859) was a Haitian poet and educator. He was born and later taught in Aquin in southwestern Haiti. He taught a broad range of subjects, including Latin, algebra, geometry, and law. As a poet, Lhérisson is remembered for his poetic songs, such as La Bergère Somnambule.
