= Colin Dayan =

Professor in the Humanities at Vanderbilt University

Colin Dayan FAAAS
- Born: 1949 (age 76–77); Atlanta
- Other name: Joan Dayan
- Occupations: Writer, academic, scholar, researcher, essayist
- Awards: Guggenheim Fellowship (2004); AAAS Fellow (2012)

Academic background
- Education: CUNY Graduate Center; Smith College
- Website: colindayan.com

Colin Dayan FAAAS (born 1949), also known as Joan Dayan, is Professor Emerita, the Robert Penn Warren Professor in the Humanities at Vanderbilt University, where she teaches American studies, comparative literature, and the religious and legal history of the Americas.

She has written extensively on prison law and torture, Caribbean culture and literary history, as well as on Haitian poetics, Edgar Allan Poe, and the history of slavery. She received a Guggenheim Fellowship in 2004 and was elected to the American Academy of Arts and Sciences in 2012.

== Early life and education ==
After receiving her Ph.D. from the Graduate Center of the City University of New York in 1980, she taught at Princeton University, Yale University, the Graduate Center of the City University of New York, Queens College of the City University of New York, the University of Arizona, and the University of Pennsylvania.

== Career and work ==
Dayan is the author of eight books. Her literary history work includes a 1977 English translation of René Depestre's A Rainbow for the Christian West and the 1987 book Fables of Mind: An Inquiry into Poe's Fiction, which discusses themes of knowledge and identity in Edgar Allan Poe's short stories.

Her book Haiti, History, and the Gods (1995) reorients the study of Haitian history through what she calls "literary fieldwork". In the process, she recasts many boundaries: between politics and poetics, between the secular and the sacred, and between the colonizer and the colonized, those who deemed themselves masters and those who worked as slaves.

Dayan has written multiple books which focus on animal rights issues and human-dog socialization as extended metaphors for imprisonment, racism and non-human personhood. These works include The Story of Cruel and Unusual (2007), pit bull fighting in The Law Is a White Dog: How Legal Rituals Make and Unmake Persons (2011), and canine representation in media in With Dogs at the Edge of Life (2015). Dayan has also written about pit bull profiling for publications such as The Conversation.

Her memoirs In the Belly of Her Ghost (2019) and Animal Quintet (2020) use nature and animal imagery to evoke "the uncanny power of physical objects", framing her Haitian heritage and her childhood in the American South in the context of human treatment of animals.

== Publications ==
- A Rainbow for the Christian West. Translated from French. By René Depestre. Amherst: University of Massachusetts Press, 1977.
- Fables of Mind: An Inquiry into Poe's Fiction. Oxford: Oxford University Press, 1987.
- Haiti, History, and the Gods. Berkeley: University of California Press, 1995.
- The Story of Cruel and Unusual. Cambridge, MA: MIT Press, 2007.
- The Law Is a White Dog: How Legal Rituals Make and Unmake Persons. Princeton: Princeton University Press, 2011.
- With Dogs at the Edge of Life. New York: Columbia University Press, 2015.
- In the Belly of Her Ghost: A Memoir. New York: Pantheon Books, 2019.
- Animal Quintet: A Southern Memoir. New York: Pantheon Books, 2020.

== Awards and honors ==
She received a Guggenheim Fellowship in 2004 and was elected to the American Academy of Arts and Sciences in 2012.
