= Franklin W. Knight =

Jamaican historian (born 1942)

- Born: 1942 (age 82–83); Manchester Parish, Jamaica
- Education: Calabar High School
- Alma mater: University of the West Indies, Mona; University of Wisconsin–Madison
- Occupation: Historian
- Employer: Johns Hopkins University

Franklin W. Knight (born 1942) is a Jamaican historian of Latin America and the Caribbean. He is an emeritus professor at Johns Hopkins University, where he was the Leonard and Helen R. Stulman Professor of History from 1993 to 2014 and director of the Centre for Africana Studies. He was awarded a Gold Musgrave Medal for literature in 2013.

He joined the faculty of Johns Hopkins University in 1973 and in 1978 became the first black faculty member at the university to gain academic tenure. Prior to joining the faculty at Johns Hopkins, Knight was assistant professor of history at Stony Brook University.

Knight was born in the parish of Manchester, Jamaica, and attended Calabar High School in Kingston. He gained his degree in history from the University of the West Indies, Mona in 1964 and his PhD from the University of Wisconsin–Madison. From 1998 to 2000, he served as the President of the Latin American Studies Association. In 2007, Knight was awarded an honorary doctorate from his alma mater, the University of the West Indies.

== Selected bibliography ==
- Dictionary of Caribbean and Afro–Latin American Biography, co-edited with Henry Louis Gates Jr (Oxford University Press, 2016)
- Contemporary Caribbean Cultures and Societies in a Global Context, co-edited with Teresita Martinez-Vergne (2005).
- Las Casas: An Introduction, Much Abbreviated, of the Destruction of the Indies (Hackett, 2003)
- The Slave Societies of the Caribbean (Macmillan, 1997)
- The Caribbean: The Genesis of a Fragmented Nationalism (Oxford, 1978; 2nd edition, revised 1990)
- The Modern Caribbean, co-edited with Colin A. Palmer
- The Modern Caribbean, co-edited with Colin A. Palmer (University of North Carolina Press, 1989)
- Africa and the Caribbean: Legacies of a Link, co-edited with Margaret Crahan (Johns Hopkins, 1979)
- The Caribbean: The Genesis of a Fragmented Nationalism (Oxford, 1978; 2nd edition, revised 1990, 3rd edition revised, 2012)
- The African Dimension of Latin American Societies (Macmillan, 1974)
- Slave Society in Cuba during the Nineteenth Century (Wisconsin, 1970)
