= The Maidens of the Rocks =

1895 novel by Gabriele D'Annunzio

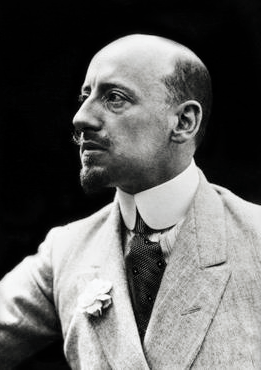
- Italian writer Gabriele D'Annunzio
- Author: Gabriele D'Annunzio
- Language: Italian
- Genre: Novel
- Publication date: 1895
- Publication place: Italy

The Maidens of the Rocks (Italian: Le vergini delle rocce) is a novel by the Italian writer Gabriele D'Annunzio, published in 1895.

== Overview ==
After publishing Il Piacere, Il trionfo della morte, Giovanni Episcopo and The Intruder, D'Annunzio came into contact with the work of Nietzsche, from which he remained deeply marked. Nietzsche's works didn't exist in Italian at the time, so D'Annunzio, who was well versed in French and the "French cultural developments of the period", read them as they were being published in Paris. In Il trionfo della morte there are already some significant references to the thought of the German philosopher, but it is only with The Virgins of the Rocks that Nietzsche's acquisition, as a literary suggestion and stimulus, becomes more clear. In giving life to the figure of the protagonist of the novel, the Vate is informed by the Übermensch.

The virgins of the rocks, initially published in installments on the Convito, was to constitute the first book of a cycle (I romanzi del giglio) that D'Annunzio would later give up completing, despite having already sketched the main themes of the other two works he had designed, whose titles should have been: The Grace and The Annunciation (followed by a short Epilogue). It is possible that the last two novels of the trilogy never saw the light due to the writer's inability to depart from the theme of paternity, together with the difficulty "to renew in the second and third volumes the ways and the intensity of style that support or enhance the first… ".

The novel is written entirely in the first person yet, in spite of this, "at its conclusion the narrator is still almost completely lacking in distinguishing personal traits".

== Reception ==
According to the 2009 American book Nietzsche, Godfather of Fascism?, The Maidens of the Rocks can be seen as "D'Annunzio's own political manifesto of the Übermensch."
