= Ardouin =

Ardouin is a French surname. Notable people with the surname include:

- Beaubrun Ardouin (1796–1865), Haitian historian and politician
- Céligny Ardouin (1806–1849), Haitian historian and politician
- Coriolan Ardouin (1812–1836), Haitian poet
- Nicolas Ardouin (born 1978), French footballer

== See also ==
- Ardoin
- Hardouin
