= Il Piacere =

1889 novel by Gabriele D'Annunzio

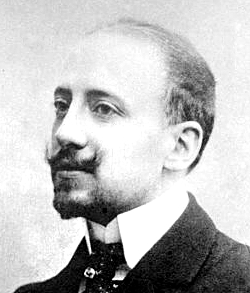
- picture of D'Annunzio in 1889
- Author: Gabriele D'Annunzio
- Language: Italian
- Series: Romanzi della Rosa
- Genre: Novel
- Publisher: Treves
- Publication date: 1889
- Publication place: Italy
- Media type: Print (hardback and paperback)

Il Piacere (Pleasure) is the first novel by Gabriele D'Annunzio, written in 1889 at Francavilla al Mare, and published the following year by Fratelli Treves. Beginning in 1895, the novel was republished with the heading I Romanzi della Rosa ("The Romances of the Rose"), forming a narrative cycle including The Intruder (The Victim, in America), and Triumph of Death.

== Plot ==
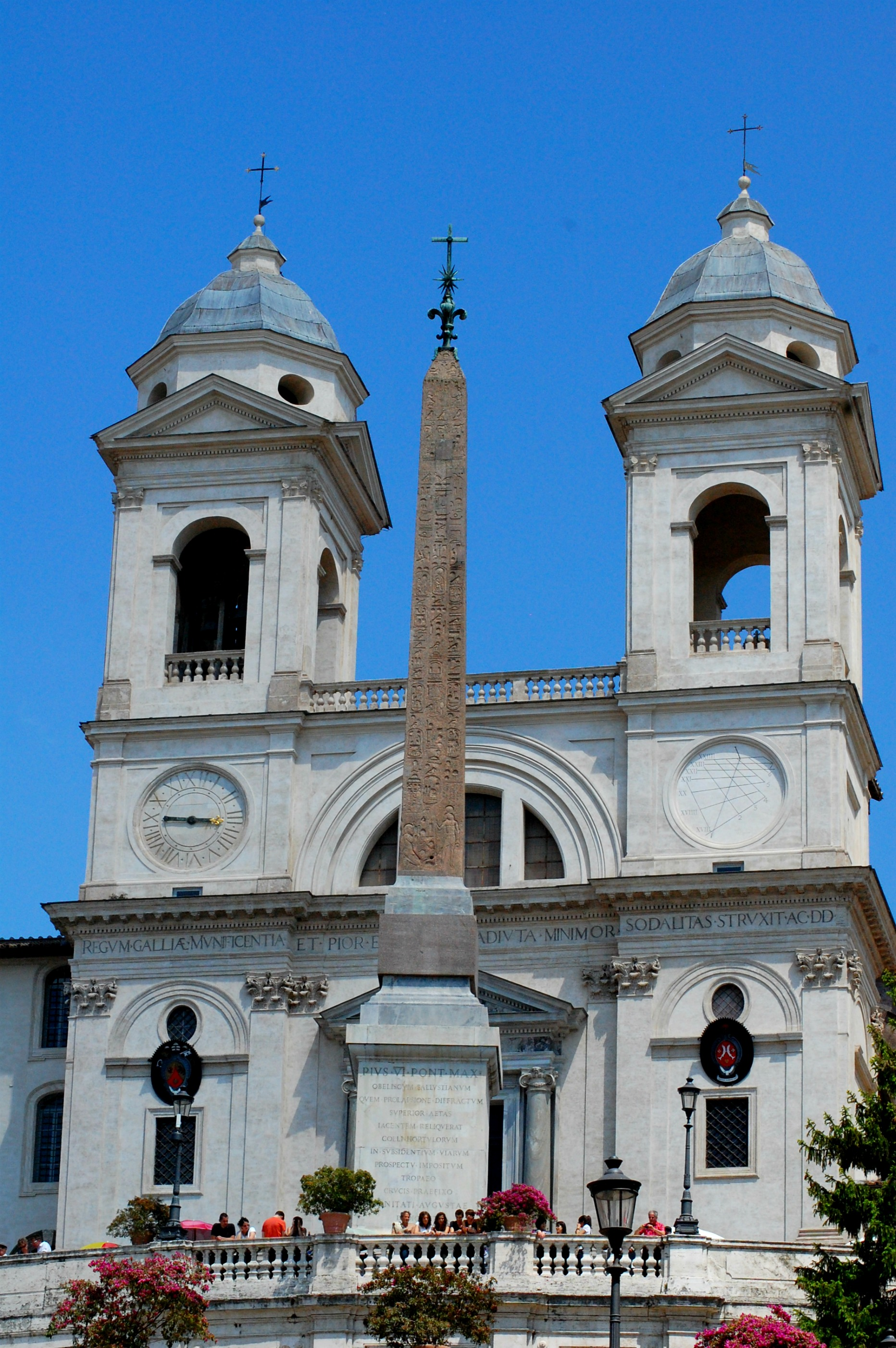
Trinità dei Monti

Andrea Sperelli is a young noble dandy of Rome who lives in Palazzo Zuccari (Trinità dei Monti), although he is originally from Abruzzo. He loves Elena Muti, although she is married to another. Andrea fights a duel with a rival for the affections of yet another married woman, but gets injured, and taken to Francavilla al Mare, where, at Villa Schifanoja, he meets the beautiful Maria Ferres. Andrea, when cured, realizes that he loves both Maria and Elena. At the end of the story, however, he loses both women.

=== Book I ===
On 31 December 1886 Andrea Sperelli anxiously awaits the arrival of his ex-lover, Elena Muti in his house, Palazzo Zuccari. While waiting for her, he remembers their last farewell, which took place almost two years ago, in March 1885. Elena broke up with him in a carriage, telling him that she is to marry an Englishman. When Elena arrives, he alternates between his feelings of love for her and pain because of their separation. The narrator then explains the history Andrea's family, and his father's advice to Andrea, and his arrival to Rome as a youth. The reader then learns about Andrea and Elena's first meeting, which took place at a dinner party hosted by the Marchesa of Ateleta, Andrea's cousin. The two talk at the party and the next day meet each other again. The two begin an affair, which ends abruptly when Elena announces one night that she is leaving him. After she leaves, Andrea begins a long line of seductions, seducing seven noble women in total. At last he begins to try to seduce Ippolita Albònico. One day, while at a horse race, Andrea angers Ippolita's husband who challenges him to a duel. Even though Andrea is better at fencing, he sustains a grave injury during the duel.

=== Book II ===
Andrea spends time recovering at the home of his cousin Francesca, in the Villa Schifanoja. During this time he composes several poems. On 15 September 1886 Maria Ferres arrives to the villa along with her husband (who leaves shortly after) and daughter, Delfina. 10 days later, on 25 September, Andrea is seduced by Maria Ferres (unbeknownst to her). Andrea finally declares his love for Maria but she demurs because her daughter is present. Maria keeps a diary during these days, in which she writes down her own feelings about the events that transpire and of her love for Andrea. Finally, on 4 October, Maria tells Andrea that she loves him. Her husband returns and the two lovers are separated.

=== Book III ===
Once he returns to Rome, Andrea resumes his decadent lifestyle, as it was before his injury: he spends time with women of the demimonde and superficial, indifferent friends. Restless and full of bitterness, he meets Maria Ferres. His attraction to his old lover, in her new role as temptress, and his fascination with Maria for her pureness and fragility, become intertwined in his mind. He therefore tries to seduce Elena in again, in the palace where he'd first possessed her, Palazzo Barberini, but her husband appears and he immediately gives up. Soon after, Andrea spends time at Maria Ferres' house in Rome, where they talk. The next night, the two meet again at a concert at the Philharmonic, which Elena also attends. Elena becomes jealous of the couple and before leaving, asks Andrea to accompany her to her carriage where she kisses him passionately. Andrea then has a moral crisis but ultimately decides to pursue Maria, whom he loves. This does not stop him from still dreaming about Elena.

=== Book IV ===
Rejected by Elena's cold nature, Andrea learns through friends that Maria's husband has fallen into financial ruin caused by gambling. Maria remains strong in the face of her pain and tells Andrea that he must remain faithful to her. Andrea, however, is struggling to conceal his "doppio gioco," literally, double game, that he has been playing, wherein he has been courting Maria and Elena without either of them knowing about the other. After seeing Elena leave her house to visit a new lover, Andrea becomes distressed. He then visits Maria and inadvertently calls out Elena's name while the two are having sex. Maria is horrified and leaves him. Andrea begins avoiding his friends and acquaintances, but one day decides to go to an auction of Maria's husband's estate. There he buys an armoire and returns home just as it is being delivered. The novel closes with him slowly following the armoire up the steps into Palazzo Zuccari.

== Topics ==
The central theme is that of the decadent esthete. The novel is a central text of the Italian decadent literary movement, Decadentism. D'Annunzio was inspired by Huysmans's pioneering work À rebours, which also strongly influenced Oscar Wilde's novel The Picture of Dorian Gray. The esthete Andrea is a nobleman who loves only art, and who is dedicated to the veneration of a woman, Elena. Elena's chimerical nature, however, destroys the balance of the protagonist, and reveals her to be a kind of femme fatale. Sperelli's search for pleasure is doomed to remain unsatisfied, since he is unable to choose between two feminine archetypes represented, respectively, by Elena Muti (the femme fatale) and Maria Ferres (the pure woman), which cannot coexist in a single individual. The style of the novel is also of utmost importance: D'Annunzio adopts a unique brand of writing replete with courtly neologisms, frequently inflected with assonance and consonance. The work's insistence on a unique, pure language may account for its quasi- mannerist and baroque tones.

== Translations ==
The first English version entitled The Child of Pleasure was translated by Georgina Harding, published in 1898.

A new unexpurgated English translation by Lara Gochin Raffaelli was published in 2013.
