= Hardouin =

Hardouin is a given name and surname. Notable people with the name include:

- Hardouin de Graetz, or Ortwin (1475–1542), German scholar and theologian
- Hardouin Mansart (1646–1708), or Jules Hardouin Mansart , French architect
- Charles Hardouin (1694–1718), French operatic baritone
- Jean Hardouin (1646–1729), French classical scholar
- Jean-Louis Hardouin Michelin de Choisy (1786–1867), French malacologist and palaeontologist
- Maria Hardouin (1864–1954), Italian noblewoman, wife of Gabriele D'Annunzio
- Maria Le Hardouin (1912–1967), Swiss French-speaking writer and woman of letters

== See also ==
- Ardoin
- Ardouin
