= Bergeaud =

Bergeaud is a French surname. Notable people with the surname include:

- Claude Bergeaud, French basketball coach
- David Bergeaud, French composer, record producer and multi-instrumentalist
- Emeric Bergeaud, Haitian novelist
