= Flesh Will Surrender =

1947 film

Flesh Will Surrender -Il delitto di Giovanni Episcopo-
- Film poster
- Directed by: Alberto Lattuada
- Screenplay by: Suso Cecchi D'Amico; Aldo Fabrizi; Federico Fellini; Alberto Lattuada; Piero Tellini
- Based on: Giovanni Episcopo by Gabriele D'Annunzio
- Produced by: Marcello D'Amico
- Starring: Aldo Fabrizi; Roldano Lupi; Yvonne Sanson
- Cinematography: Aldo Tonti
- Edited by: Giuliana Attenni
- Music by: Felice Lattuada
- Production company: Lux Film
- Distributed by: Lux Film
- Release date: 23 September 1947
- Running time: 85 minutes
- Country: Italy
- Language: Italian

Flesh Will Surrender (Italian: Il delitto di Giovanni Episcopo) is a 1947 Italian drama film directed by Alberto Lattuada. It is based on the novel Giovanni Episcopo by Gabriele D'Annunzio. It was entered into the 1947 Cannes Film Festival.

== Plot ==
Giovanni Episcopo is a modest clerk, shy and awkward. The man does not know that he is going to be punished forever by fate. In fact, Giovanni falls in love with Ginevra. The two get married, generate a son, and go to live in a house that Giovanni buys with his savings. A friend of Giovanni's, Giulio Wanzer, who had a love affair with Ginevra, is determined to ruin his life. The character of Ginevra changes and becomes more cruel and aggressive, and when Giulio, at the height of presumption, is installed in the home of Giovanni and is aggressive with Ginevra and their son, Giovanni goes mad with rage and kills Giulio.

== Cast ==
- Aldo Fabrizi as Giovanni Episcopo
- Roldano Lupi as Giulio Wanzer
- Yvonne Sanson as Ginevra Canale
- Ave Ninchi as Emilia Canale
- Amedeo Fabrizi as Ciro Episcopo
- Nando Bruno as Antonio
- Alberto Sordi as Doberti
- Francesco De Marco as Canale
- Lia Grani as Signora Adele
- Maria Gonnelli as Santina
- Gino Cavalieri as Archive Director
- Gian Luca Cortese as Marquess Arguti (as Luca Cortese)
- Folco Lulli as Carlini
- Galeazzo Benti as Cavalry Officer
- Silvana Mangano as Dancer
- Gina Lollobrigida as Dancer
