= Ardoin =

Ardoin is a surname. Notable people with the surname include:

- Alphonse "Bois Sec" Ardoin (1915–2007), American Cajun accordionist
- Amédé Ardoin (1898–1942), American Creole musician
- Chris Ardoin, American zydeco accordionist
- Danny Ardoin, American baseball player
- John Ardoin (1935–2001) American music critic
- Kyle Ardoin, American politician from Louisiana
- Ronald Ardoin, American jockey

== See also ==
- Ardouin
- Hardouin
