= Ignace Nau =

Haitian poet and storyteller

- Born: July 13, 1808; Port-au-Prince, Haiti
- Died: 1846 (aged 37–38); Léogâne, Haiti
- Occupations: Poet storyteller
- Writing career
- Language: French

Ignace Nau (July 13, 1808 – 1845 Léogâne) was a Haitian poet and storyteller. Born in Port-au-Prince, Nau studied in a renowned military school in Haiti before attending the Catholic University of New York. After returning to Haiti, Nau founded a literary society named "The School of 1836" with his brother, Emile Nau, and the Ardouin brothers, Beaubrun, Céligny, and Coriolan. Ignace Nau published the literary magazine Le Républicain, which was censored by the Haitian government and was later renamed L'Union.

== Selected works ==
- Le Livre de Marie (poem)
- Pensées du Soir (poem)
- Le Lambi (story)
- Episode de la Révolution (story)
- Isalina (story)
