= Halcyon (poetry collection) =

Poetry collection by Gabriele D'Annunzio

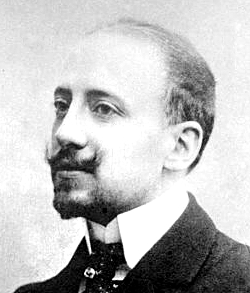
Gabriele D'Annunzio

Halcyon (Italian: Alcyone [alˈtʃoːne, alˈtʃɔːne]) is the title of a collection of 88 poems by Italian poet Gabriele D'Annunzio, written between 1899 and 1903, and published in 1903. It was intended as the third volume of a seven-book work called Laudi del cielo, del mare, della terra e degli eroi ("Odes to the sky, to the sea, to the earth and to the heroes") which was subsequently interrupted in 1912 with only four volumes published: Maia, Elettra, Halcyon, and Merope.

== Origin ==
On July 7, 1899, D'Annunzio wrote to his editor Treves about a long and complex lyrical work he was developing. The seven books of the Laudi were named after the stars in the Pleiades cluster. Of these, the first three were published in 1903, while Merope was published in 1912.

D'Annunzio began to write poetry again after an extended hiatus (his last lyrical work, Poema paradisiaco was dated 1893), during which he was leading an eventful life between journeys, political experiences and the newly established sentimental bond with actress Eleonora Duse. Halcyon is seen by the poet as a radical departure from his previous work, in which he feels he will be writing more freely, abandoning models, forms and characters from the past without giving up to the extremely vast culture that, in fact, springs through Halcyon, going from Ancient Greek mythology, Latin quotations and Italian Renaissance reminiscences.

== Structure ==
Halcyon comprehends 88 poems, ordered by a structural method that does not reflect the chronological order of composition. Between the first ("La tregua"), and the last one ("Il commiato") the ideal of a Summer spent within sentimental joy and poetical accomplishment outlines. The collection is divided into five sections interrupted by four long dithyrambs.

Its best known poems are perhaps La pioggia nel pineto (Rain in the Pinewood) and La sera fiesolana (Evening in Fiesole). These two lyrical works are commonly learned in the Liceo as high examples of Decadentist poetry.

== Style ==
Halcyon is known for its Classical references, sensuality and vivid erotism. Most of its poems are written in a style that privileges alliterations and intricated rhyming schemes, thus making Halcyon extremely difficult to render in translation.

In this work, many poetic pictures are inspired by a feeling of strong connection with nature, which often translate into images of characters assuming the forms of plants or animals: for example, in the Rain in the Pinewood, Hermione’s face complexion turns to green.
