= Beaubrun Ardouin =

Haitian historian and politician (1796–1865)

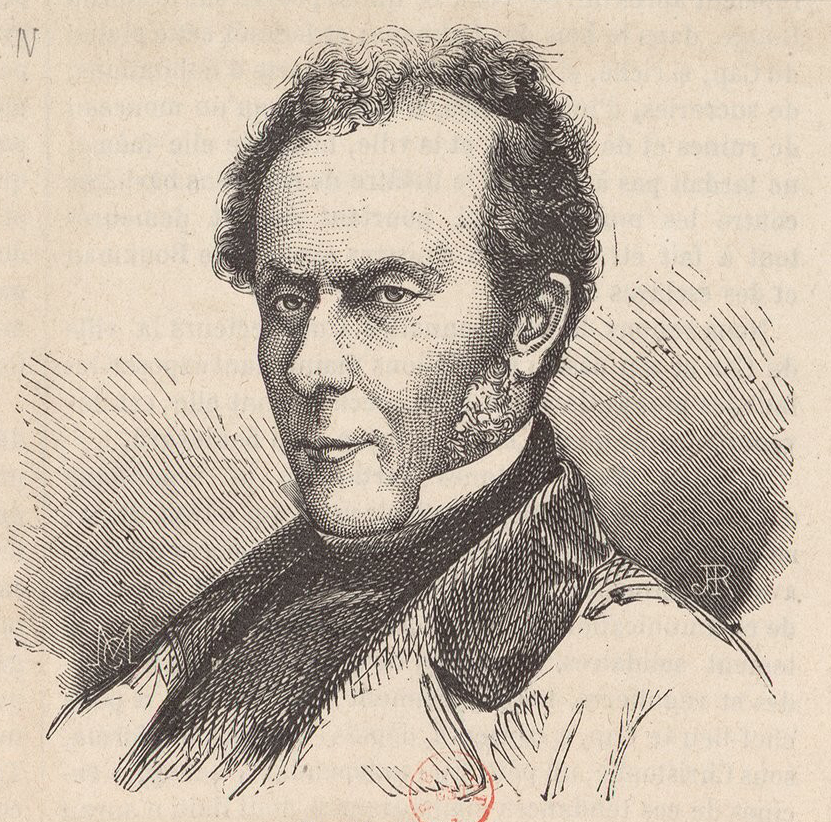
c. 1865 portrait of Ardouin

Alexis Beaubrun Ardouin (October 30, 1796 – August 30, 1865) was a Haitian historian and politician. He wrote the eleven-volume Études sur l'Histoire d'Haïti (Studies on the History of Haiti), published in the 1850s and 60s. His Études have served as a valuable resource for later historians. Beaubrun Ardouin also wrote the first Haitian textbook, Géographie de l'île d'Haïti (Geography of the Island of Haiti) and Instruction sur le Jury. Ardouin's historical writing attempted to put the Haitian Revolution in the context of other nationalist revolutions in the Americas. He had Euro-African ancestry and his family was free before the revolution. He has been criticized by 20th-century scholars for championing free people of color as the leaders both of the revolution and of post-independence Haiti.

Historian Thomas Madiou, who sought to repair the reputation of the great black heroes of the Haitian revolution, especially Toussaint Louverture, and to portray the revolution as a successful slave uprising instead of as a national independence movement, is often cited as Ardouin's intellectual opponent. Historian and writer Henock Trouillot describes the conflict between nineteenth-century Haitian historians in more complex terms in his biography of Ardouin, claiming that Ardouin lacked historical resources to assess the significance of Louverture. Trouillot also describes Ardouin's intense involvement in Haitian politics in the 1840s and his exile to Paris. While in Paris, Ardouin was responsible for editing and publishing Emeric Bergeaud's novel Stella with Dentu in 1859, one year after Bergeaud's death. The novel is widely known as Haiti's first and portrays the Haitian Revolution as a movement demonstrating the unity of Haitian citizens and the importance of the formation of Haiti as an antislavery state.

Beaubrun Ardouin was elected senator in 1832 and served on the Council of Secretaries of State in 1845. Growing up during the revolutionary period, Beaubrun Ardouin was not able to attend school regularly; he was self-taught. He had a strong interest in French literature, especially the works of Voltaire, Montesquieu, and Jean-Jacques Rousseau. Ardouin's brothers, Céligny and Coriolan, were also well-known; Céligny as a politician and historian, Coriolan as a poet. The three Ardouin brothers, along with the Nau brothers, Emile and Ignace, were members of the literary society "The School of 1836," which was founded by Ignace Nau. Coriolan died young in 1836, while Céligny ran afoul of Faustin-Élie Soulouque's government and was executed in 1849. Beaubrun published Céligny's Essais sur l'Histoire d'Haïti (English: Essays on the History of Haiti) in 1865, just before his own death.
