= Marco Egidio Allegri =

Italian esotericist (1894-1949)

Marco Egidio Allegri (1897–1949) was an Italian esotericist. He is best known for his closeness to Gabriele D'Annunzio, with whom he was one of the protagonists of the "Fiume endeavour" which led to the Italian Regency of Carnaro.

== Biography ==
Allegri was born in Venice. He initiated the famous Italian writer Gabriele D'Annunzio into Martinism with the initiatic name Ariel.

A well-known figure in twentieth-century Freemasonry, Allegri remains especially linked to the development and preservation of Martinism in Italy, the spiritual current born from the teachings of French mystic Louis Claude de Saint-Martin. As a Freemason, Allegri reached the top of the Ancient and Accepted Scottish Rite, in which he was awarded the 33rd degree. On 23 November 1923, he was appointed Patriarch Grand Conservator ad vitam of the Memphis Rite of Palermo, having already possessed a similar initiatic qualification for the Misraïm Rite of Venice, rites that he unified into the Ancient and Primitive Oriental Rite of Misraïm and Memphis.

Following Fascism's seizure of power and the laws that outlawed secret societies, Masonic lodges suspended their activities on Italian territory, while martinist work continued in secret, thanks to Alessandro Sacchi (Grand Master until 1926 under the name "Sinesius") and Allegri (successor to the grand mastership under the name "Flamelicus").

From 1928 to 1932 he was condemned to solitary confinement. At his death in Crespano del Grappa in 1949, the fate of Italian Martinism and also of the Ancient and Primitive Oriental Rite of Misraïm and Memphis was entrusted to Count Ottavio Ulderigo Zasio.

He was also a member of the Order of Malta.

== Martinism and the Egyptian Rites ==
In 1925, Allegri became martinist Initiator (S:::I:::I:::) and was co-opted by the lawyer Alessandro Sacchi, his martinist Initiator and Grand Master of the Italian Martinist Order, into the Supreme Council. Following Fascism's seizure of power and the laws that outlawed secret societies, Masonic lodges suspended their activities on Italian territory, while Martinist work continued in secret thanks to Alessandro Sacchi (Grand Master of the Ordine Martinista until 1926 with the mystic name of “Sinesius”) and Allegri (successor to the grand mastership with the initiatory name “Flamelicus”). Allegri continued to tour Italy far and wide, also favoured in this by his profession as a journalist, in order to maintain contact with the various groups and to promote the spread of the Memphis Rite, Scottish Freemasonry and Martinism. His tireless activity attracted the malevolent intentions of the political police so much that he suffered two arrests, a period of confinement and an exile in North Africa. In 1941 he was entrusted with the Initiatic Deposit of the Misraïm of Venice (dormant for almost a century) by the last Patriarch Grand Conservator of that lineage, Brother Luigi Boselli.

When the defeat of the Axis began to emerge clearly on the horizon, Allegri began to work hard to reorganise both Freemasonry and Martinism, finding two very valid supports in Fabio Valentino, mason of Le Droit Humaine (a co-masonic order), Martinist and leading exponent of the Order of Knight-Masons Elect Priests of the Universe, and Tito Signorelli, a prominent figure of the Supreme Council of Sovereign Grand Inspectors General, 33rd degree, of the Grand Orient of Italy.

Allegri aspired to the unification of all the main Italian Masonic families, in order to then proceed to the subsequent unification of the most important Initiatic Orders. His thought was that only through a union of all the forces that work for the elevation of man it is possible to really affect civil society, by transferring into it those values of freedom, honesty, justice, fraternity, tolerance, love, which constitute the common heritage of all authentic esoteric associations. This project was illustrated by Brother Allegri in his book “Introduction to the Masonic Secret” where the Venetian Initiate describes his project of constitution of a single Masonic Rite through the fusion of the Egyptian Rites with the Ancient and Accepted Scottish Regime, The Rectified Scottish Rite and the York Rite.

This project was less peregrine than it might appear to a superficial observation, given that there are however different points of contact, especially in the lower degrees, between these Masonic Rites. All this led Allegri to simplify the pyramid of the degrees of Mizraim and Memphis by merging the degrees.

This is the explanation that Allegri himself provides:

The Ancient and Primitive Oriental Rite of Mitzraïm and Memphis is the result of the intimate reworking of the Rite of Misraim or Egyptian, regularly resurrected in Venice in 1801, and of the Memphis or Oriental Rite, born in 1839 in Paris, on a nomenclature that re-elaborates the degrees of Misraim introducing Eastern type initiations and rituals.

At his death in 1949, the fate of Italian Martinism and also of the Ancient and Primitive Oriental Rite of Mitzraïm and Memphis was entrusted to Count Ottavio Ulderigo Zasio. Today the Grand Master of both the Italian Ordine Martinista and the Antico e Primitivo Rito Orientale (Rettificato) di Mitzraïm e Memphis is Renato Romeo Pietro Salvadeo (Arturus).
