= Émile Nau =

Haitian historian and politician

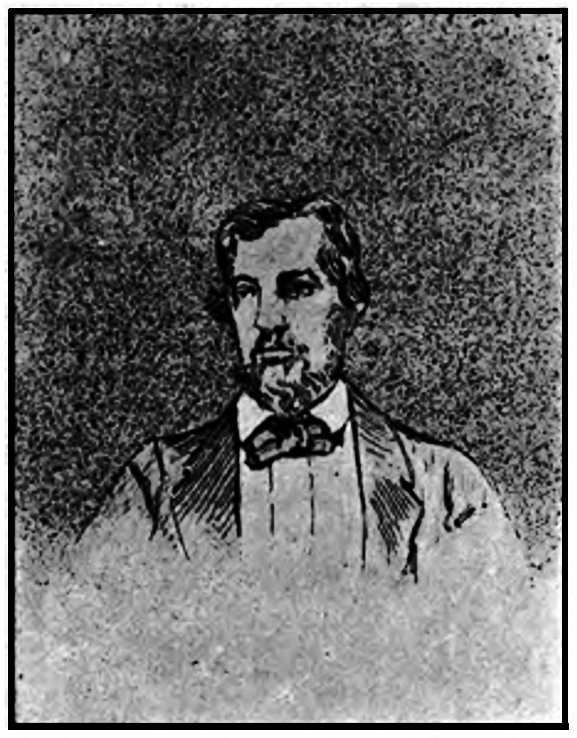

Émile Nau (26 February 1812 – 27 February 1860) was a Haitian historian and politician. Born in Port-au-Prince, Nau's most famous work is Histoire des Caciques d'Haïti, a history of the "Caciques", or tribal chiefs of native inhabitants (Taïnos), of Haiti. Nau was the co-editor of two important magazines, Le Républicain and L'Union, which were published by his brother Ignace Nau. Emile and the Ardouin brothers, Beaubrun, Céligny, and Coriolan, were members of the literary society "The School of 1836" founded by his brother Ignace. Emile Nau also served as Delegate (Prefect) of Port-au-Prince during the presidency of Jean-Pierre Boyer.
