= Forse che sì forse che no =

1910 novel written by Gabriele D'Annunzio

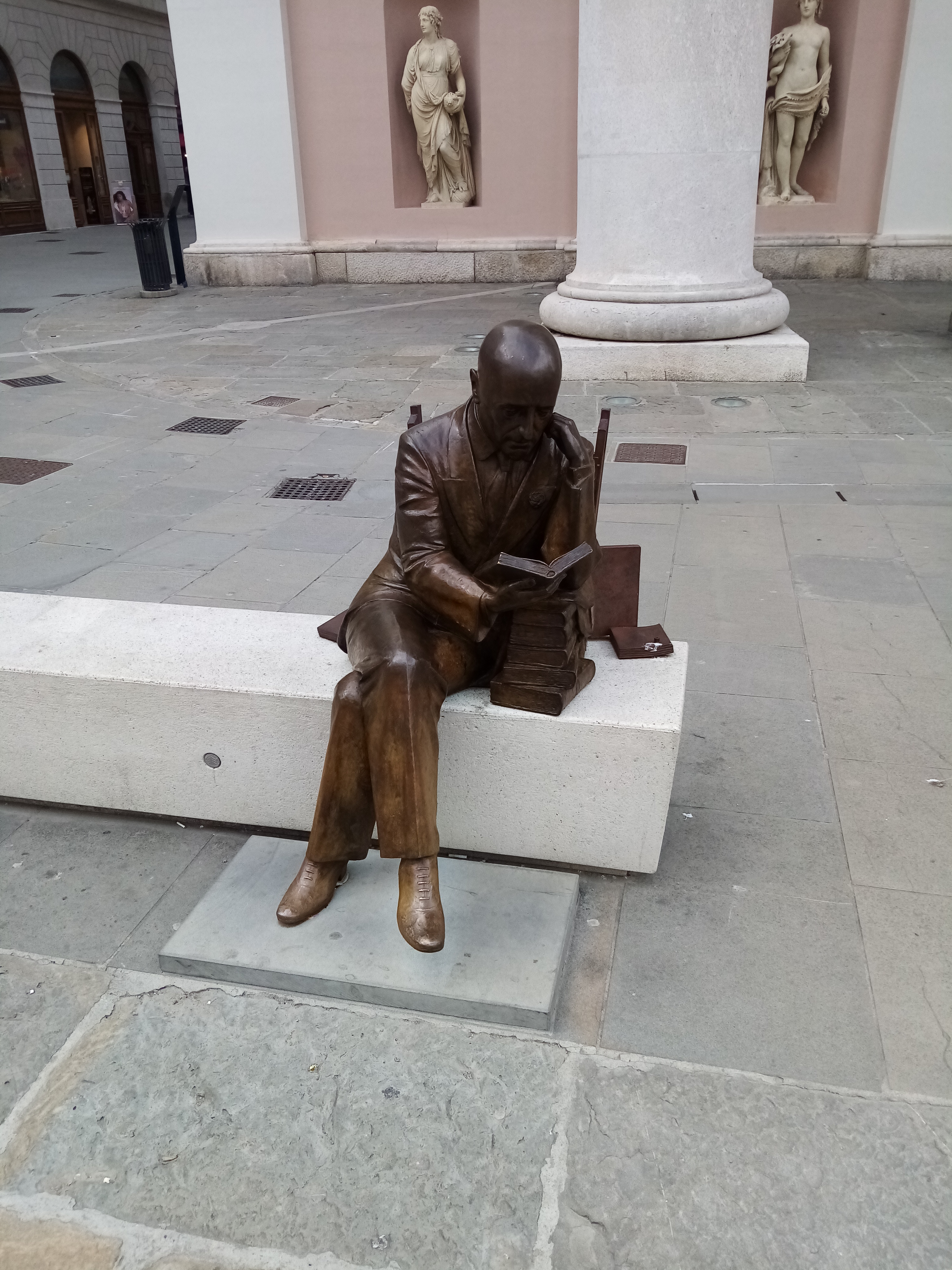
Statue of Gabriele D'Annunzio in Trieste

Forse che sì forse che no (Maybe Yes, Maybe No) is a novel published in 1910 by Gabriele D'Annunzio. As all of D'Annunzio's novels, Forse che sì forse che no partially echoes one of D'Annunzio's own experiences. In particular, this novel draws on D'Annunzio's summer of "erotic frenzy with Donatella [Cross]." He originally planned to title the novel Vertigine, meaning 'vertigo', and even attempted to change Forse che sì forse che no since he was made aware that its rhythm matched the Neapolitan popular song Funiculì, Funiculà. This book is considered to be the "last great D'Annunzian novel."

== Plot ==
Forse che sì forse che no is set in the promising and upcoming world of aviation; it deals with the development of various passions that both unite and divide the five bourgeois main characters, who are destined to encounter pain and death.

The story revolves around the birth of a passionate love affair between Paolo Tarsis and Isabella Inghirami. Simultaneously, the stories of both Vanina and Lunella, Isabella's sisters, and their brother Aldo intertwine.

Pained by the discovery of Paolo's and Isabella's liaison, Aldo and Vanina begin to show suicidal tendencies. It culminates in them attempting to commit suicide by leaning over a crumbling wall.

Vanina is actually in love with Paolo, yet Isabella, in spite of being aware this, continues her amour with him. At first, no one understands Aldo's motivations. Towards the end of the novel, it comes to light that he has an incestuous relationship with his sister Isabella.

Vanina runs to Paolo to expose the relationship between her two siblings. Enraged by this, Paolo awaits Isabella's arrival and takes his anger out on her, beating and insulting her, while her sister Vanina returns home and commits suicide.

From this moment onwards, Isabella, who is a determined and confident character up to that point, begins to fall into a deep crisis. Her spiraling out of control leads to her father and stepmother admitting her to an institution, Paolo being unable to come up with a different solution.

In the end, the love affairs cross paths again at two aerial races. In the first one, Giulio, a friend of Paolo, loses his life, while the protagonist emerges victorious. The novel ends with Paolo landing in Sardinia.
