= Céligny Ardouin =

Haitian politician and historian

Charles Céligny Ardouin (July 6, 1801 – August 7, 1849) was a Haitian politician and historian. He served as a Delegate (Prefect) in 1846, Senator, and Minister of the Interior in 1847. In 1847 he also served on the Council of Secretaries of State. Ardouin ran afoul of President Soulouque's government and was executed in 1849.

Céligny Ardouin's brothers, Beaubrun and Coriolan, were also well-known, Beaubrun as a politician and historian, Coriolan as a poet. The three Ardouin brothers, along with the Nau brothers, Emile and Ignace, were members of the literary society "The School of 1836," which was founded by Ignace Nau. Céligny's best known historical work, Essais sur l'Histoire d'Haïti (Essays on the History of Haiti), was first published in its entirety posthumously in 1865 by his brother Beaubrun.
