= Maria Hardouin =

Italian noblewoman

- Princess consort of Montenevoso
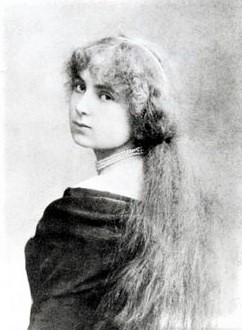
- Born: 30 January 1864; Rome, Papal States
- Died: 18 January 1954 (aged 89); Gardone Riviera, Italy
- Buried: Vittoriale degli Italiani
- Spouse: Gabriele D'Annunzio (m. 1883; died 1938)
- Issue: 3

Maria Hardouin of the Dukes of Gallese D'Annunzio, princess consort of Montenevoso (30 January 1864 – 18 January 1954) was an Italian noblewoman, wife of Gabriele D'Annunzio.

== Biography ==
Daughter of Duke Giulio Hardouin of Gallese and Natalia Lezzani, she met D'Annunzio in 1883. The relationship was opposed by her family, due to the difference in class between the two. D'Annunzio continued to see Maria secretly, until the "sin of May" (Italian: peccato di maggio) and the escape of the two to Florence, which the Italian newspapers reported.

The compromised situation of Maria, pregnant, forced her father to agree to a shotgun wedding. From her marriage, celebrated in the chapel of Palazzo Altemps in Rome on 28 July of the same year (in the absence of her father and of the d'Annunzio family) three sons were born:

- Mario, the eldest, born in Pescara (1884–1964);
- Gabriellino;
- Ugo Veniero

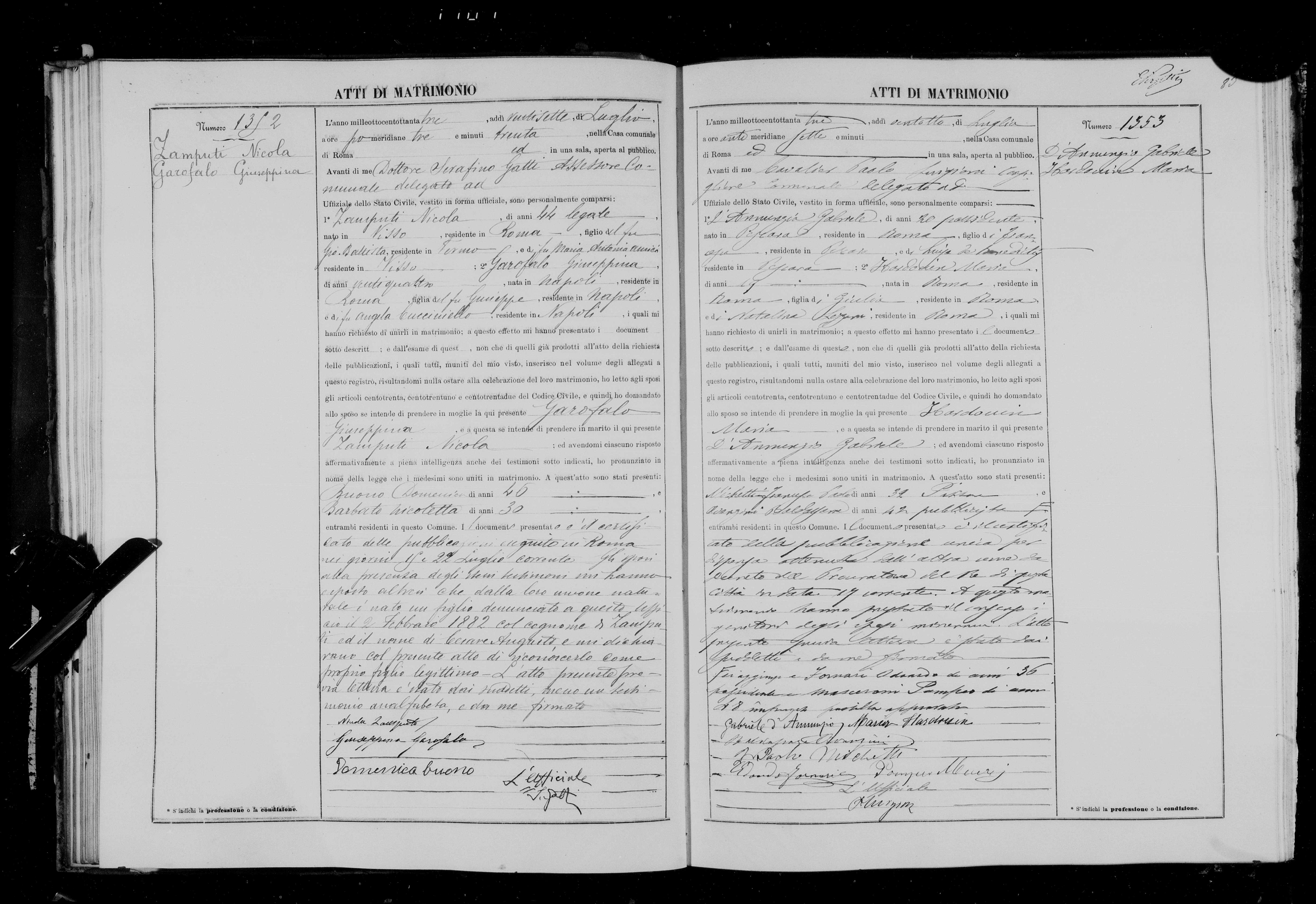
Marriage act of Gabriele D'Annunzio e Maria Hardouin

After the first years spent in Abruzzo, the couple returned to Rome, thanks to the mediation of D'Annunzio's mother-in-law Natalia di Gallese, who found D'Annunzio a job as an editor. D'Annunzio went to live in a modest house, but allowed himself expensive luxuries and had new affairs, starting to make debts. In 1890 Maria effectively separated from her spouse and, in order to preserve part of her family fortune, she filed for separation four years later. Later she moved to Paris where she got to know the poet Robert de Montesquiou. Despite his repeated betrayals, she always remained legally married to D'Annunzio, with whom she maintained good relations.

At the end of the First World War she moved to Gardone Riviera, in the Villa Mirabella, tucked in the district of the Vittoriale, the monumental citadel of the Vate; she had the title of Princess of Montenevoso, after the appointment of D'Annunzio to this noble title; in 1938 her husband died, leaving the villa to the Italian state; in 1945 both of her sons Gabriellino, who had been ill for some time, and Ugo Veniero died. Her only surviving son was the eldest, Mario, Prince of Montenevoso, who died in 1964. Maria D'Annunzio died at the age of ninety on 18 January 1954. She spent the last years of her life, died, and was buried in the Vittoriale degli Italiani at the Piazzetta Dalmata. She was buried in the parterre under the Towers of the Archives: her favorite dogs are buried in the gardens of the Vittoriale.
