= Coriolan Ardouin =

Haitian romantic poet

Coriolan Ardouin (11 December 1812 – 12 July 1835) was a Haitian romantic poet. Ardouin left only one work before his early death: a compilation of poems entitled Reliques d'un Poète Haïtien (Relics of a Haitian Poet), published posthumously in 1837.

Ardouin lived a life of tragedy. As he was born, his two-year-old brother lay dying in another room. He was orphaned at age 15 and subsequently lost his older sister as well. His wife died after five months of marriage and his own death followed soon after. A legend tells that a black butterfly landed on Ardouin's cradle at his birth, a bad omen signaling the miseries to come.

Coriolan Ardouin's brothers, Beaubrun and Céligny, were well known as historians and politicians. The three Ardouin brothers, along with the Nau brothers, Emile and Ignace, were members of the literary society "The School of 1836," which was founded by Ignace Nau
