= Giovanni Episcopo =

1891 novel by Gabriele D'Annunzio

- Author: Gabriele D'Annunzio
- Language: Italian
- Publication date: 16 February–1 March 1891
- Publication place: Italy
- English publication date: 1896

Giovanni Episcopo is an 1891 novel by the Italian writer Gabriele D'Annunzio. It tells the story of a poor Italian clerk who is humiliated by his wife and a dominant co-worker. It was D'Annunzio's second novel. It took inspiration from Russian writers such as Fyodor Dostoyevsky.

== Publication ==
The novel was serialised in the journal Protonotari in three parts from 16 February to 1 March 1891, for which D'Annunzio was paid 1000 lire. It was published in book form the year after. An English translation by Myrta Leonora Jones was published in 1896 as Episcopo and Company. A new translation by Raymond Rosenthal was published in 1988 as part of the volume Nocturne and Five Tales of Love and Death.

== Adaptations ==
The book was the basis for a 1916 film with the same title directed by Mario Gargiulo, starring Achille Vitti, Tina Xeo and Alberto Casanova. It was adapted for film again in 1947 under the title Flesh Will Surrender, directed by Alberto Lattuada and starring Aldo Fabrizi, Yvonne Sanson and Roldano Lupi.
