= Gabriele D'Annunzio =

Italian writer (1863–1938)

General Gabriele D'Annunzio Prince of Montenevoso OMS CMG MVM
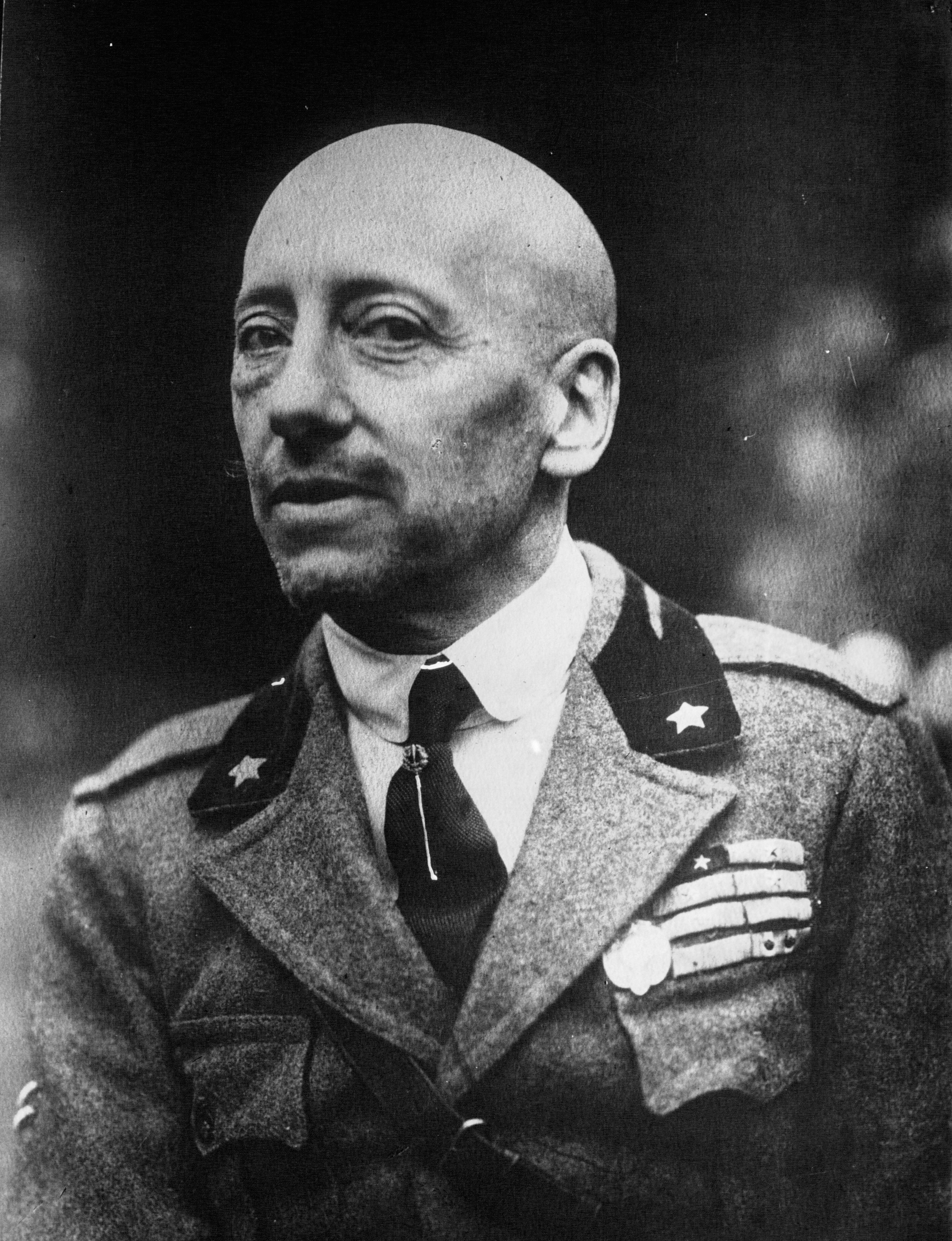
- D'Annunzio in 1922

Comandante of Carnaro
- In office 12 September 1919 – 30 December 1920
- Preceded by: Zoltán Jekelfalussy (as Governor of the City of Fiume and its District)
- Succeeded by: Riccardo Zanella (as President of the Free State of Fiume)

Member of the Chamber of Deputies
- In office 5 April 1897 – 17 May 1900
- Constituency: Ortona a Mare

Personal details
- Born: 12 March 1863 Pescara, Abruzzo, Italy
- Died: 1 March 1938 (aged 74) Gardone Riviera, Lombardy, Italy
- Resting place: Vittoriale degli Italiani, Gardone Riviera, Lombardy, Italy
- Party: Historical Right (1897–1898); Historical Far Left (1898–1900); Italian Nationalist Association (1910–1923)
- Spouse: Maria Hardouin (m. 1883; sep. 1891)
- Domestic partner: Eleonora Duse (1898–1901)
- Children: 5, including Gabriellino
- Education: Cicognini College; Sapienza University of Rome
- Profession: Writer; politician; soldier
- Nickname(s): Il Vate ("The Poet"); Il Profeta ("The Prophet")

Military service
- Allegiance: Kingdom of Italy
- Branch/service: Royal Italian Army; Royal Italian Air Force
- Years of service: 1915–1918
- Rank: General (honorary); Lieutenant colonel
- Unit: 3rd Army; Arditi
- Battles/wars: World War I; Tenth Battle of the Isonzo; Bakar raid; Flight over Vienna
- Writing career
- Years active: 1879–1938
- Period: 20th century
- Genres: Poetry; novel
- Subjects: Individualism; hedonism; existentialism
- Notable works: Il Piacere; Il trionfo della morte; La Gioconda
- Movement: Decadence

General Gabriele D'Annunzio, Prince of Montenevoso (Note: UK: /dæˈnʊntsioʊ/, US: /dɑːˈnuːn-/; Italian: [ɡabriˈɛːle danˈnuntsjo]) (12 March 1863 – 1 March 1938), sometimes written d'Annunzio as he used to sign himself, was an Italian poet, playwright, orator, journalist, aristocrat, and Royal Italian Army officer during World War I. He occupied a prominent place in Italian literature from 1889 to 1910 and in its political life from 1914 to 1924. He had the epithets il Profeta (The Prophet) and il Vate (The Poet): vate stems from the Latin vates, meaning a prophetic, divinatory, or inspirational poet.

D'Annunzio was associated with the Decadent movement in his literary works, which interplayed closely with French symbolism and British aestheticism. Such works represented a turn against the naturalism of the preceding romantics and was both sensuous and mystical. He came under the influence of Friedrich Nietzsche, which would find outlets in his literary and later political contributions. His affairs with several women, including Eleonora Duse and Luisa Casati, received public attention. In his politics, which evolved many times, he associated himself with socialism and the progressivist views of the political left, responding to the illiberal and reactionary policies of Luigi Pelloux, as well as with the Historical Far Left.

During World War I, D'Annunzio's image in Italy transformed from literary figure to national war hero. He was associated with the elite Arditi storm troops of the Italian Army and took part in actions such as the Flight over Vienna. As part of an Italian nationalist reaction against the Paris Peace Conference of 1919, he set up the short-lived Italian Regency of Carnaro in Fiume with himself as Duce. The Charter of Carnaro made music the fundamental principle of the state, which was corporatist in nature. Although D'Annunzio later preached nationalism and never called himself a fascist, he has been credited with partially inventing Italian fascism, as both his ideas and his aesthetics were an influence upon Benito Mussolini. At the same time, he was an influence on Italian socialists and an early inspiration to the first phase of the Italian resistance movement to fascism.

== Biography ==
=== Early life and family ===
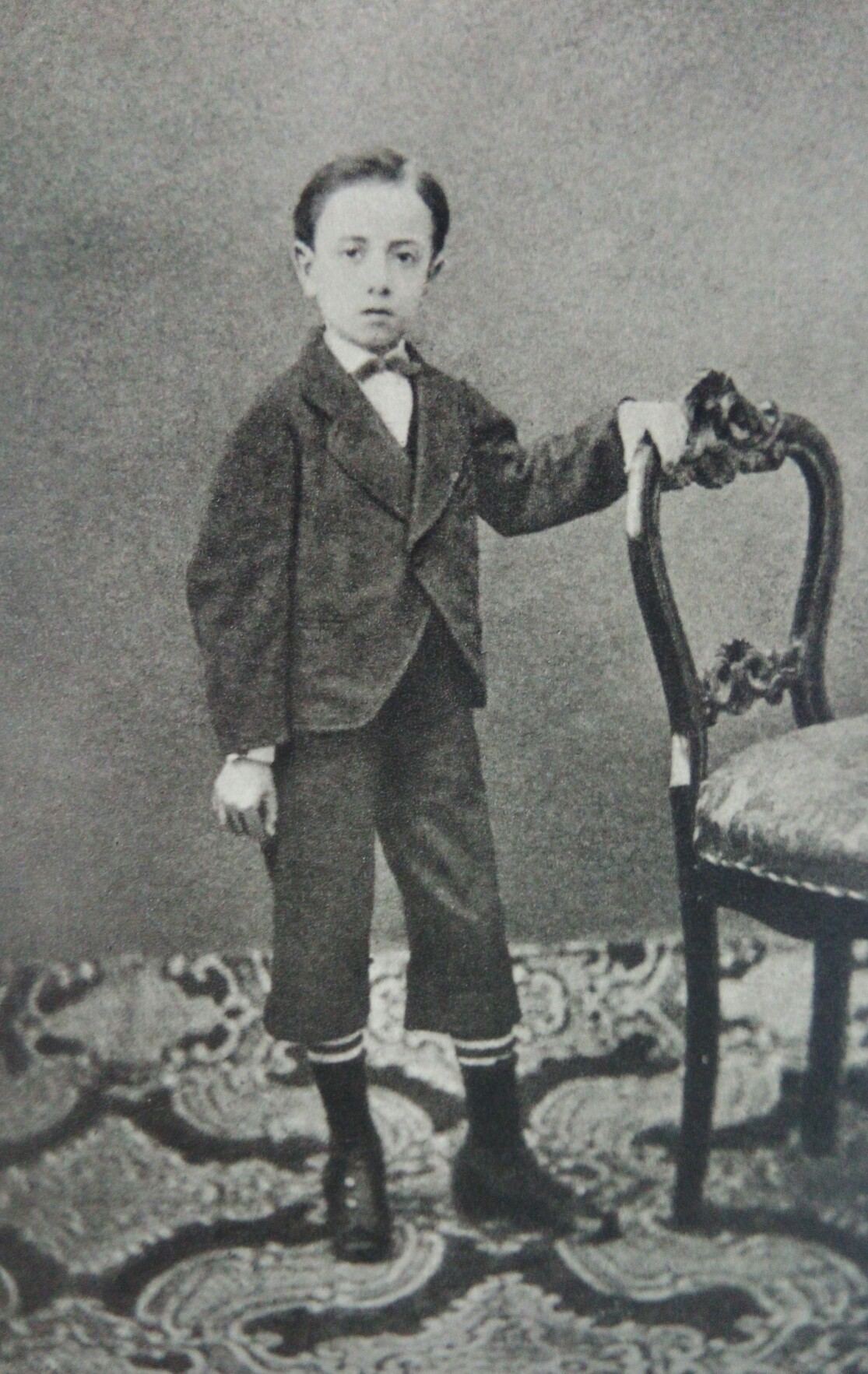
D'Annunzio in 1870, aged 7

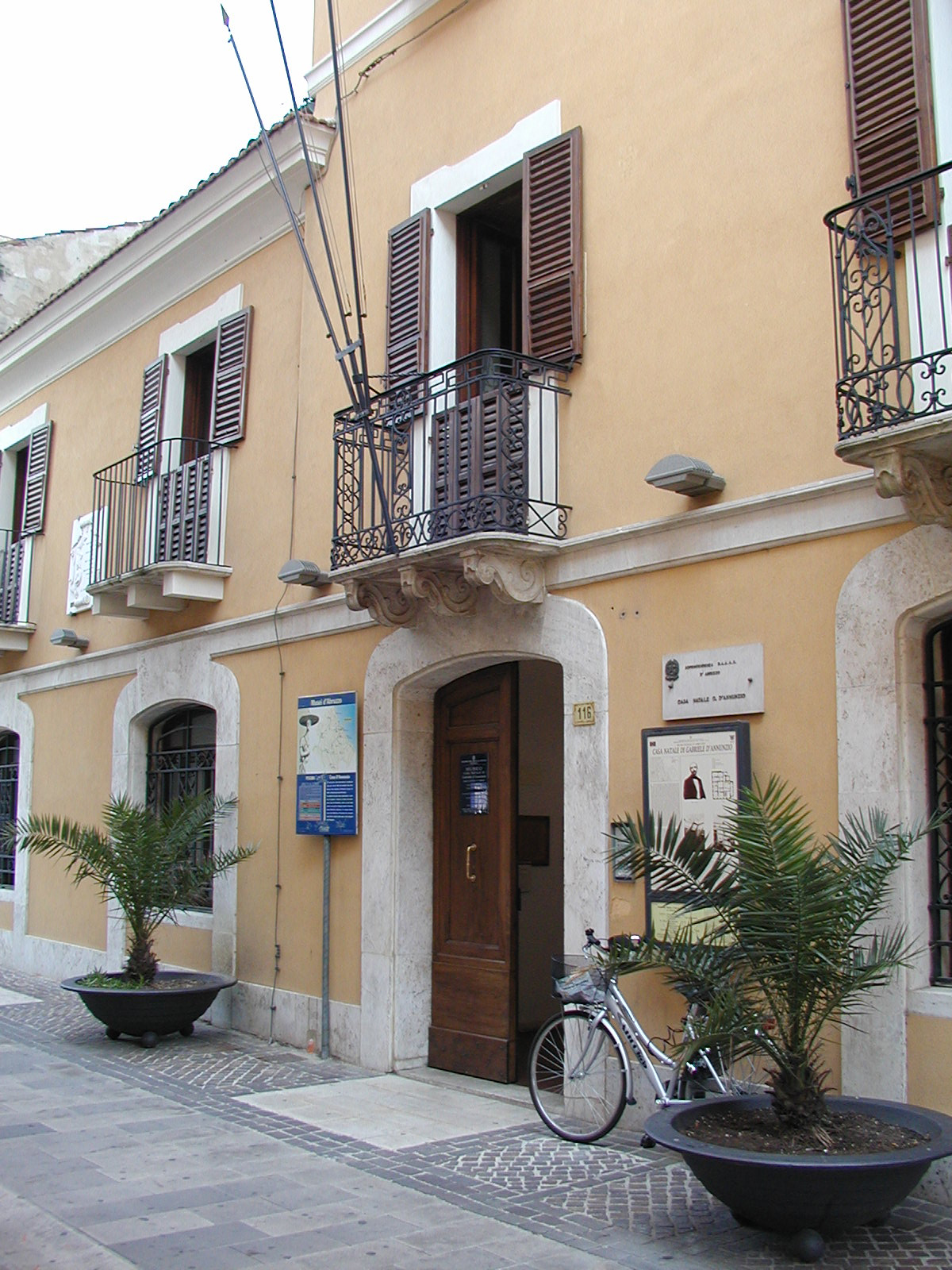
Birthplace of Gabriele D'Annunzio Museum in Pescara

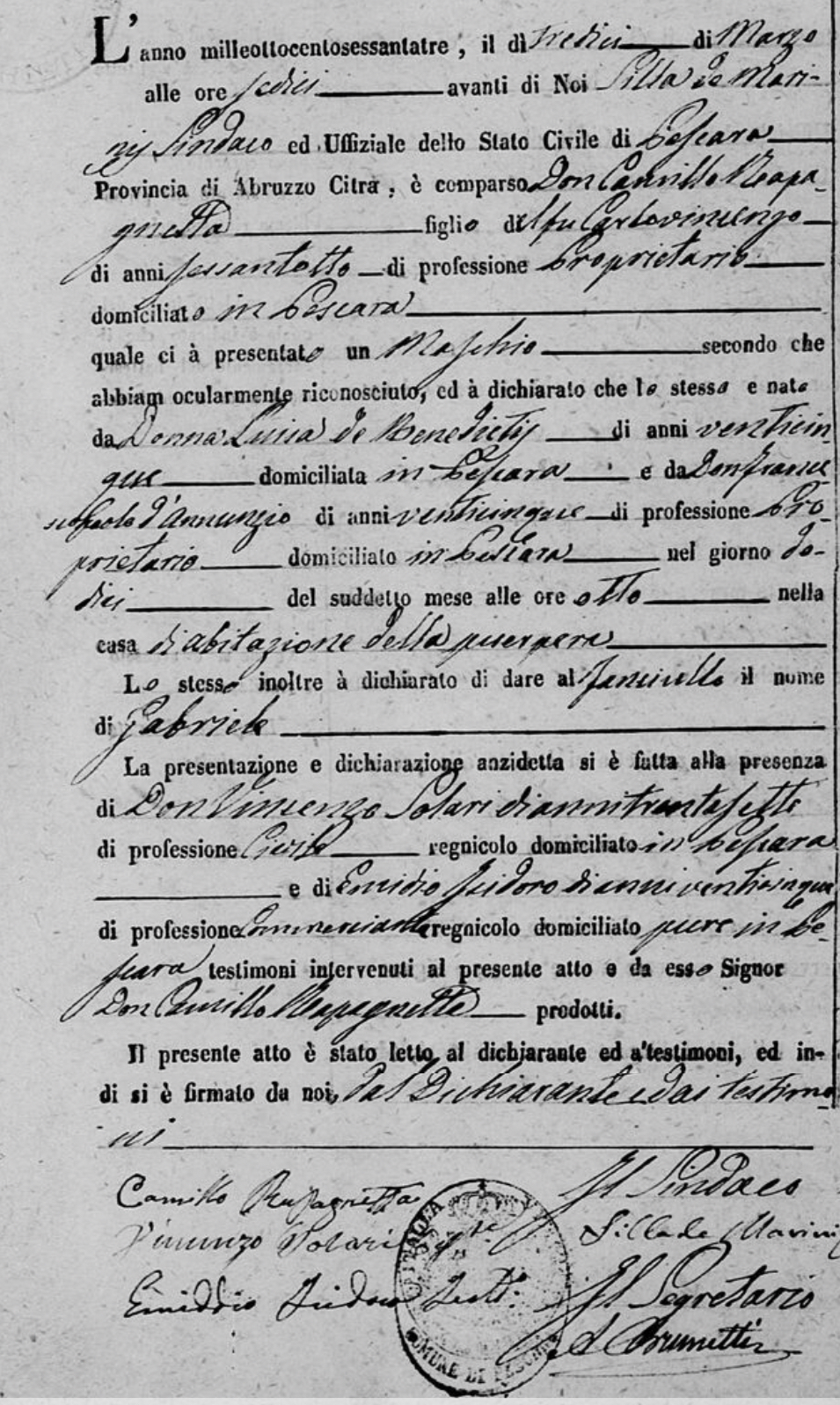
Gabriele d’Annunzio's birth certificate

D'Annunzio was born in the township of Pescara, in the modern-day Italian region of Abruzzo, the son of a wealthy landowner and mayor of the town, Francesco Paolo Rapagnetta D'Annunzio (1838–1893) and his wife Luisa de Benedictis (1839–1917). His father was born Francesco Paolo Rapagnetta, the sixth child of Camillo Rapagnetta, a shoemaker, and Rita Olimpia Lolli. At the age of 13, he was adopted by a sister of his mother Rita, Anna Lolli, who had remarried, after the death of her first husband, a wealthy merchant and shipowner, Antonio D'Annunzio. D'Annunzio's paternal grandfather, Camillo Rapagnetta (1795–1866) registered his birth. Legend has it that D'Annunzio was initially baptised Gaetano and given the name of Gabriele later in childhood because of his angelic looks; this story is purely fictitious, as can be seen by D'Annunzio's birth certificate and baptismal records, which record Gabriele as both his birth and baptismal name. (Note: For the birth certificate of D'Annunzio, see "Registro: 1863". Portale Antenati (in Italian). p. 27. For the urban legend, see Rapagnetta, Amedeo (1938). La vera origine familiare e il vero cognome del poeta abruzzese Gabriele D'Annunzio (in Italian). Lanciano: Carabba.)

D'Annunzio's precocious talent was recognised early in life, and he was sent to school at the Liceo Cicognini in Prato, Tuscany. He published his first poems – a small volume of verses called Primo Vere – in 1879, at the age of sixteen and while still at school. Influenced by Giosuè Carducci's Odi barbare, he placed some almost brutal imitations of Lorenzo Stecchetti, the fashionable poet of Postuma, side by side with translations from the Latin. His verse was so distinguished that the literary critic Giuseppe Chiarini, upon reading it, brought the unknown youth before the public in an enthusiastic article.

In 1881, D'Annunzio entered the University of Rome La Sapienza, where he became a member of various literary groups, including Cronaca Bizantina, and wrote articles and criticism for local newspapers. In those university years, he started to promote Italian irredentism.

=== Literary work ===
D'Annunzio published Canto novo (1882), Terra vergine (1882), L'intermezzo di rime (1883), Il libro delle vergini (1884) and the greater part of the short stories that were afterwards collected under the general title of San Pantaleone (1886). Canto novo contains poems full of pulsating youth and the promise of power, some descriptive of the sea and some of the Abruzzese landscape, commented on and completed in prose by Terra vergine, the latter a collection of short stories dealing in radiant language with the peasant life of the author's native province. Intermezzo di rime is the beginning of D'Annunzio's second and characteristic manner. His conception of style was new, and he chose to express all the most subtle vibrations of voluptuous life. Both style and contents began to startle his critics; some who had greeted him as an enfant prodige rejected him as a perverter of public morals, whilst others hailed him as one bringing a breath of fresh air and an impulse of new vitality into the somewhat prim, lifeless work hitherto produced.

Meanwhile, the review of D'Annunzio publisher Angelo Sommaruga perished in the midst of scandal, and his group of young authors found itself dispersed. Some entered the teaching career and were lost to literature, others threw themselves into journalism. D'Annunzio took this latter course, and joined the staff of the Tribuna, under the pseudonym of "Duca Minimo". Here he wrote Il libro d'Isotta (1886), a love poem, in which for the first time he drew inspiration adapted to modern sentiments and passions from the rich colours of the Renaissance. Il libro d'Isotta is also interesting because in it one can find most of the germs of his future work, just as in Intermezzo melico and in certain ballads and sonnets one can find descriptions and emotions which later went to form the aesthetic contents of Il piacere, Il trionfo della morte and Elegie romane (1892).

D'Annunzio's first novel Il Piacere (1889, originally translated into English as The Child of Pleasure and later, more accurately, as Pleasure) was followed in 1891 by Giovanni Episcopo, and in 1892 by L'innocente (The Intruder). These three novels made a profound impression. L'innocente, admirably translated into French by Georges Herelle, brought its author the notice and applause of foreign critics. His next work, Il trionfo della morte (The Triumph of Death) (1894), was followed soon by Le vergini delle rocce (The Maidens of the Rocks) (1896) and Il fuoco (The Flame of Life) (1900).

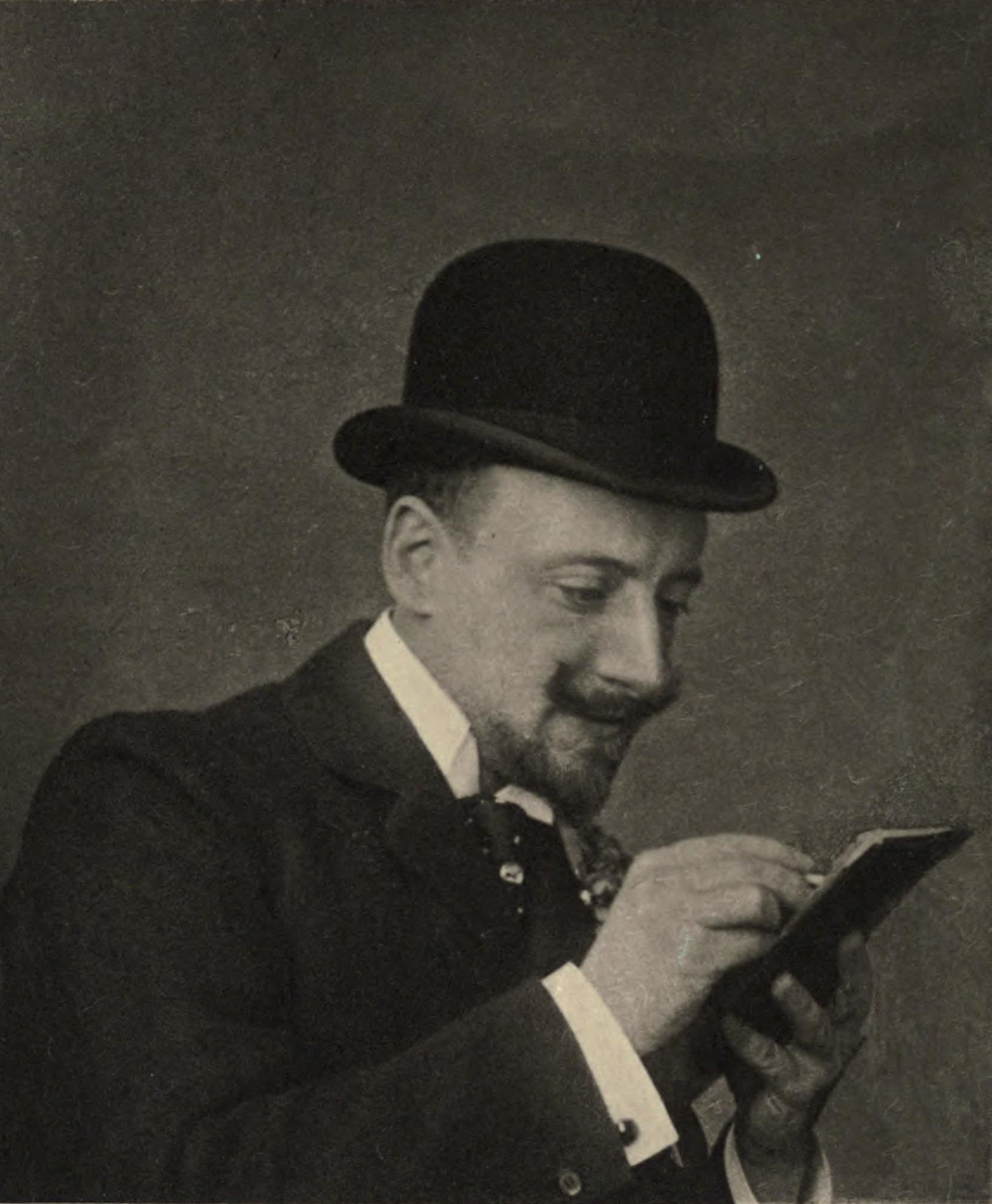
D'Annunzio in 1903

D'Annunzio's poetic work of this period, in most respects his finest, is represented by Il Poema Paradisiaco (1893), the civic poem Odi navali (1893), and Laudi (1900). A later phase of D'Annunzio's work is his dramatic production, represented by Il sogno di un mattino di primavera (1897), a lyrical fantasia in one act, and his Città Morta (The Dead City) (1898), written for Sarah Bernhardt. In 1898 he wrote his Sogno di un pomeriggio d'autunno and La Gioconda; in the succeeding year La gloria, an attempt at contemporary political tragedy which met with no success; and then Francesca da Rimini (1901), based on an episode from Dante Alighieri's Inferno which was declared by an authoritative Italian critic – Edoardo Boutet – to be the first real, if imperfect, tragedy ever given to the Italian theatre. It was adapted by Tito Ricordi to become the libretto for the opera Francesca da Rimini by Riccardo Zandonai, which premiered in 1914.

In 1883, D'Annunzio married Maria Hardouin di Gallese, and had three sons, Mario (1884–1964), Gabriele Maria "Gabriellino" (1886–1945) and Ugo Veniero (1887–1945), but the marriage ended in 1891. In 1894, he began a love affair with the actress Eleonora Duse which became a cause célèbre. He provided leading roles for her in his plays of the time such as La città morta (1898) and Francesca da Rimini (1901), but the tempestuous relationship finally ended in 1910. After meeting the Marchesa Luisa Casati in 1903, he began a lifelong, turbulent on-again, off-again affair with Luisa that lasted until a few years before his death.

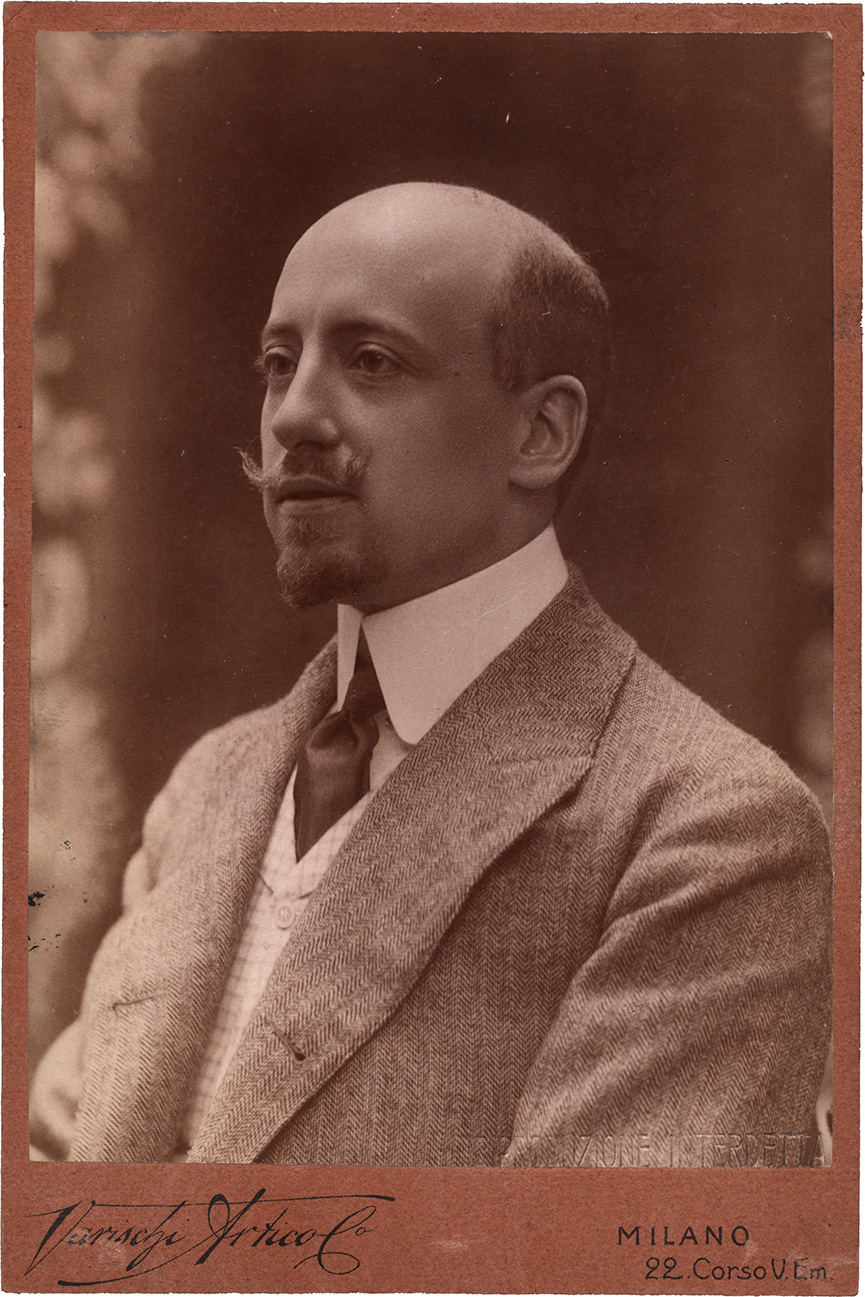
D'Annunzio in a photo before 1938

In 1897, D'Annunzio was elected to the Chamber of Deputies for a three-year term, where he sat as an independent. By 1910, his daredevil lifestyle had forced him into debt, and he fled to France to escape his creditors. There he collaborated with composer Claude Debussy on a musical play, Le Martyre de saint Sébastien (The Martyrdom of St Sebastian), 1911, written for Ida Rubinstein. The Holy See reacted by placing all of his works in the Index of Forbidden Books. The work was not successful as a play, but it has been recorded in adapted versions several times, notably by Pierre Monteux (in French), Leonard Bernstein (songs in French, dialogue in English), and Michael Tilson Thomas (in French). In 1912 and 1913, D'Annunzio worked with opera composer Pietro Mascagni, writing the libretto for the opera Parisina, staying sometimes in a house rented by the composer in Bellevue, near Paris. D'Annunzio insisted that the entire, long libretto should be set to music, which eventually meant that the work was too long for audiences of the time and required the entire last act to be removed.

In 1901, D'Annunzio and Ettore Ferrari, the Grand Master of the Grand Orient of Italy, founded the Università Popolare di Milano (Popular University of Milan), located in via Ugo Foscolo. D'Annunzio held the inaugural speech and subsequently became an associate professor and a lecturer in the same institution. In 1902, D'Annunzio visited Istria, an "irredent land", then under Austro-Hungarian rule. He was welcomed in Pisino by a "pouring of flowers" let down from the windows of the crowded houses, visited the Italian gymnasium and was paid a homage designed by the future wife of Francesco Salata. In a letter addressed to the same Italian historian, D'Annunzio complimented with him about the civility of the Italian population living there, praising the struggle of the "great, manifold, transfiguring Latin civilisation against the barbaric abuse".

D'Annunzio was a Grand Master of the Grand Lodge of Italy, a Scottish Rite that in 1908 had separated from the Grand Orient of Italy. Subsequently, he adhered to the Christian mystic and philosophic movement known as Martinism, collaborating in Fiume with other 33rd degree Scottish Rite Freemasons and occultists like Alceste De Ambris, Sante Ceccherini, and Marco Egidio Allegri. The Masonic initiation of D'Annunzio is testified by the choice of Masonic symbols for the flag of the Regency of Carnaro, such as the Ouroboros and the seven stars of the Ursa Major.

=== World War I ===
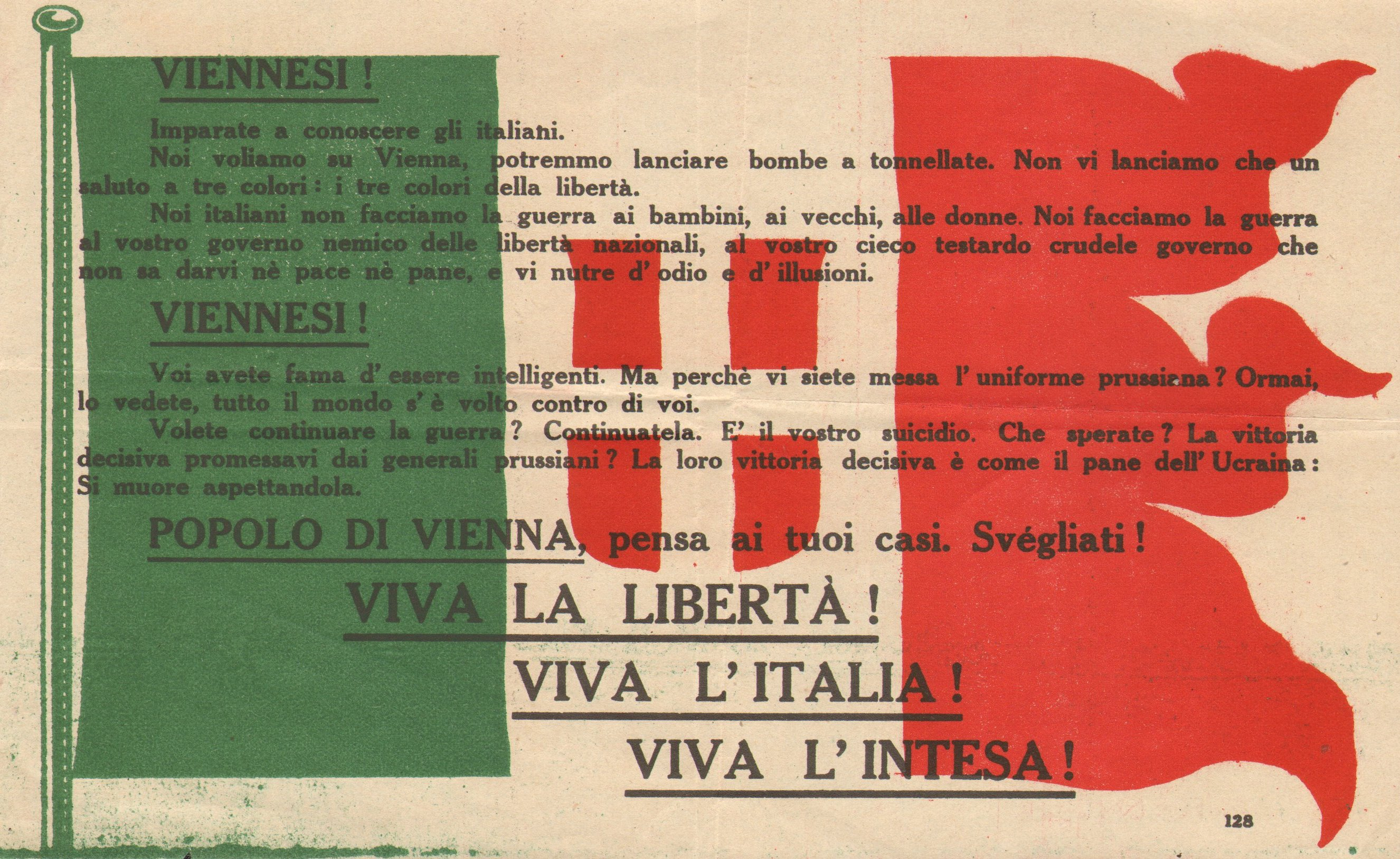
Italian translation of the propaganda leaflet which D'Annunzio threw from his aeroplane during his flight above Vienna

After the start of World War I, D'Annunzio returned to Italy and made public speeches in favour of Italy's entry on the side of the Triple Entente, including the famous Discorso di Quarto ("Quarto Speech"). Since taking a flight with Wilbur Wright in 1908, D'Annunzio had been interested in aviation. With the war beginning, he volunteered and achieved further celebrity as a fighter pilot, losing the sight of an eye in a flying accident.

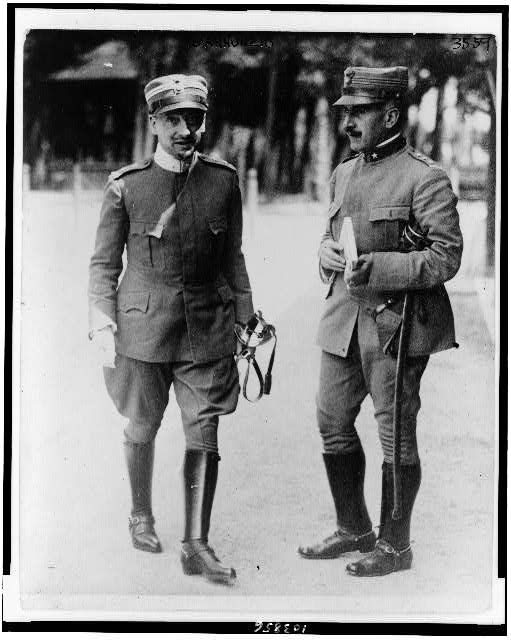
D'Annunzio (left) with a fellow officer

In February 1918, he took part in a daring, if militarily irrelevant, raid on the harbour of Bakar (known in Italy as La beffa di Buccari, lit. the Bakar Mockery), helping to raise the spirits of the Italian public, still battered by the Caporetto disaster. On 9 August 1918, as commander of the 87th fighter squadron "La Serenissima", he led nine planes in a 1,100 km (700 mi) round trip to drop propaganda leaflets on Vienna. This is called il Volo su Vienna ("The Flight over Vienna") in Italian.

=== Fiume ===
The war strengthened D'Annunzio's ultranationalist and Italian irredentist views, and he campaigned widely for Italy to assume a role alongside her wartime allies as a first-rate European power. Angered by the Paris Peace Conference proposed handing over of the city of Fiume (now Rijeka in Croatia) whose population, when the suburbs are included, had a slight Croat majority, D'Annunzio led 186 grenadiers of the Royal Italian Army's 2nd Grenadiers Regiment's I Battalion from Ronchi to Fiume to seize the city on 12 September 1919. Within days troops from other army units joined D'Annunzio in Fiume, who soon commanded a force of 2,500 troops of former Royal Italian Army troops, Italian nationalists, and World War I veterans of the Italian front. D'Annunzio then forced the inter-Allied (American, British and French) occupying forces to withdraw. The plotters sought to have Italy annex Fiume but were denied. Instead, Italy initiated a blockade of Fiume while demanding that the plotters surrender.

D'Annunzio then declared Fiume an independent state, the Italian Regency of Carnaro; the Charter of Carnaro foreshadowed much of the later Italian Fascist system, with himself as "Duce" (leader). Some elements of the Royal Italian Navy, such as the destroyer Espero, joined up with D'Annunzio's local forces. He attempted to organise an alternative to the League of Nations for (selected) oppressed nations of the world (such as the Irish, whom D'Annunzio attempted to arm in 1920), and sought to make alliances with various separatist groups throughout the Balkans (especially groups of Italians, though also some Slavic and Albanian groups), although without much success. D'Annunzio ignored the Treaty of Rapallo and declared war on Italy itself, only finally surrendering the city on 29 December 1920 after a bombardment by the Italian navy and five days of fighting.

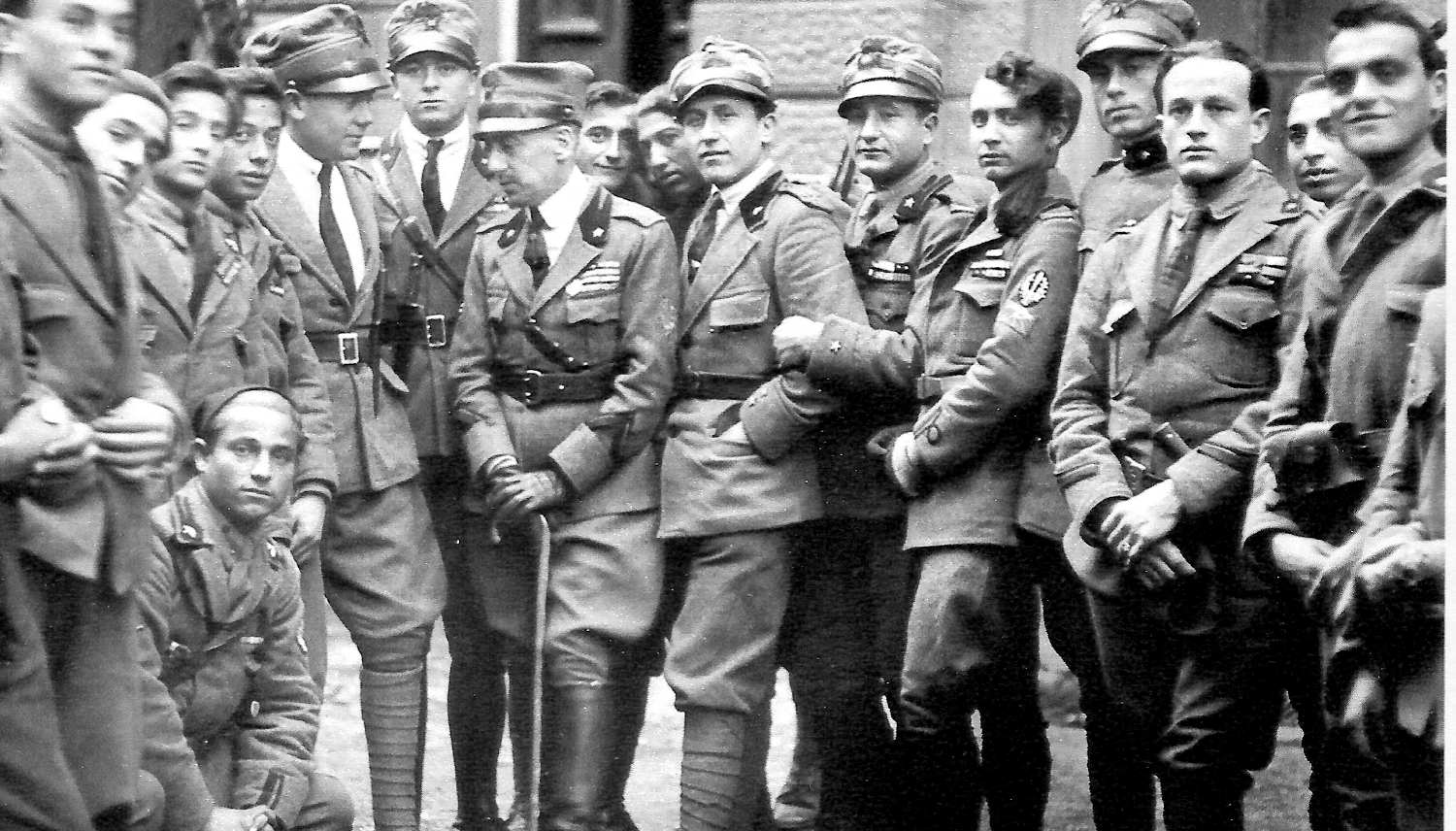
D'Annunzio (near the centre with cane) with some legionaries (components of the Arditi's department of the Italian Royal Army) in Fiume in 1919. Next to D'Annunzio (right) is Arturo Avolio, a lieutenant and the commander of the Arditi's department of Bologna Brigade.

=== Later life ===
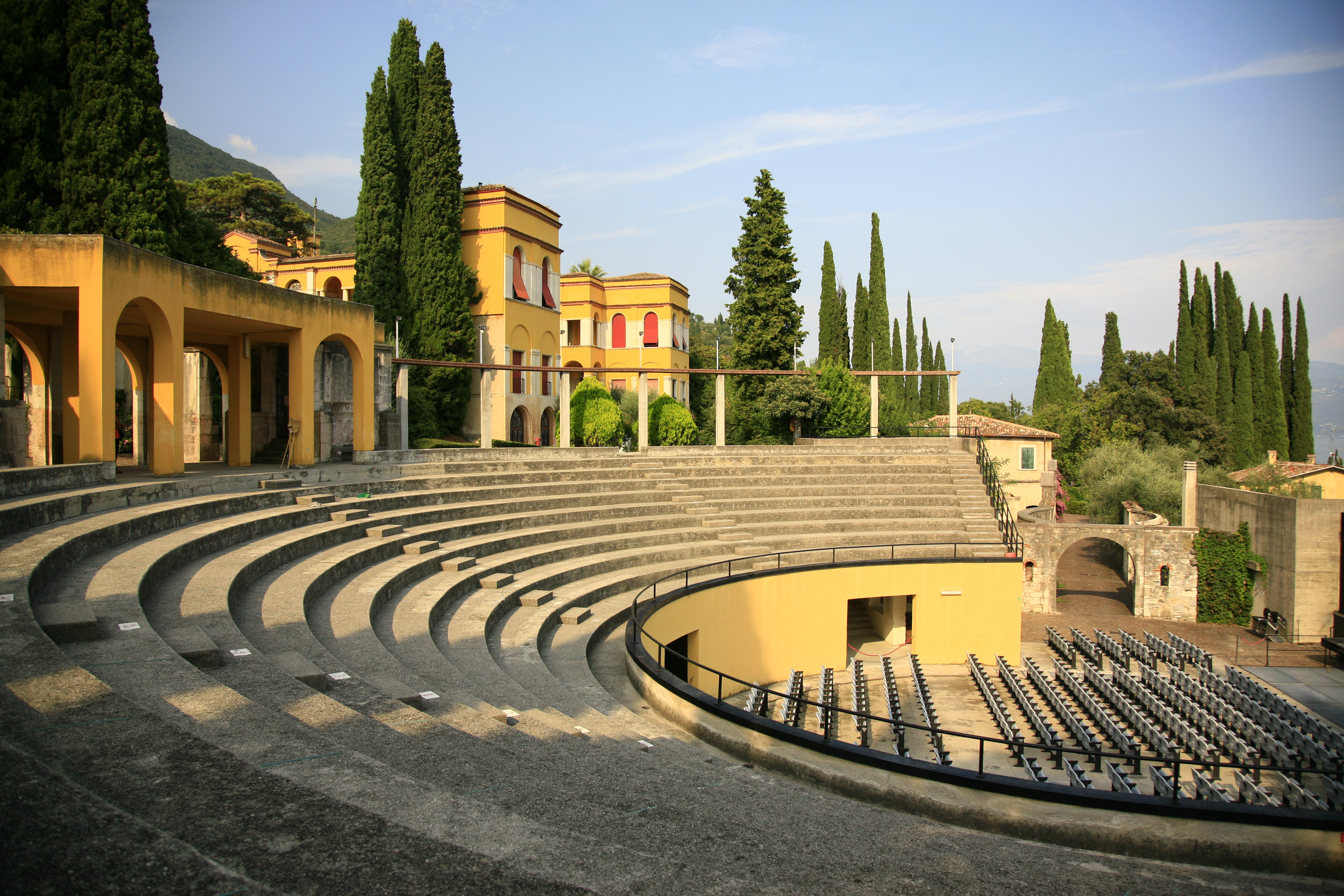
Villa of Vittoriale degli Italiani

After the Fiume episode, D'Annunzio retired to his home on Lake Garda and spent his latter years writing and campaigning. Although D'Annunzio had a strong influence on the ideology of Benito Mussolini, he never became directly involved in fascist government politics in Italy. In 1922, shortly before the march on Rome, he was pushed out of a window by an unknown assailant, or perhaps simply slipped and fell out himself while intoxicated. He survived but was badly injured, and recovered only after Mussolini had been appointed Prime Minister.

In 1924, D'Annunzio was ennobled by King Victor Emmanuel III and given the hereditary title of Prince of Montenevoso (Italian: Principe di Montenevoso). In 1937 he was made president of the Royal Academy of Italy. D'Annunzio died in 1938 of a stroke, at his home in Gardone Riviera. He was given a state funeral by Mussolini and was interred in a magnificent tomb constructed of white marble at Il Vittoriale degli Italiani. His son, Gabriellino D'Annunzio, became a film director. His 1921 film The Ship was based on a novel by his father. In 1924, he co-directed the historical epic Quo Vadis, an expensive failure, before retiring from filmmaking.

== Politics ==
=== D'Annunzio and fascism ===
Tomb of Gabriele D'Annunzio

Although D'Annunzio initially briefly associated himself with the Historical Right and his political views often evolved, D'Annunzio later associated himself with the Historical Far Left, socialism, and progressivism. D'Annunzio is also often seen within the context of proto-fascism as a precursor of the ideals and techniques of Italian fascism. His political ideals emerged in Fiume when he coauthored a constitution with Alceste de Ambris, a syndicalist, the Charter of Carnaro. De Ambris provided the legal and political framework, to which D'Annunzio added his skills as a poet. De Ambris was the leader of a group of Italian seamen who had mutinied and then given their vessel to the service of D'Annunzio. The constitution established a corporatist state, with nine corporations to represent the different sectors of the economy (workers, employers, and professionals), and a tenth (D'Annunzio's invention) to represent the perceived superior human beings, the heroes, poets, prophets, and supermen. The Charter of Carnaro also declared that music was the fundamental principle of the state. Others disagree and cite his initial opposition to fascism, as well as his influence on Italian socialists and anti-fascists.

D'Annunzio, the de facto dictator of Fiume, maintained control through what has been described as a "new and dangerously potent politics of spectacle". It was this culture of dictatorship that Benito Mussolini imitated and learned from D'Annunzio. D'Annunzio has been described as the John the Baptist of Italian fascism, as virtually the entire ritual of Fascism was invented by D'Annunzio during his occupation of Fiume and his leadership of the Italian Regency of Carnaro. These included the balcony address, the Roman salute, the cries of "Eia, eia, eia! Alala!" taken from Achilles's cry in the Iliad, the dramatic and rhetorical dialogue with the crowd, the use of religious symbols in new secular settings, as well as blackshirted followers (the Arditi) with their disciplined, bestial responses and strongarm repression of dissent. He was even said to have originated the practice of forcibly dosing opponents with large amounts of castor oil, a very effective laxative, to humiliate, disable, or kill them, a practice that became a common tool of Mussolini's Blackshirts.

=== Rivalry with Benito Mussolini ===
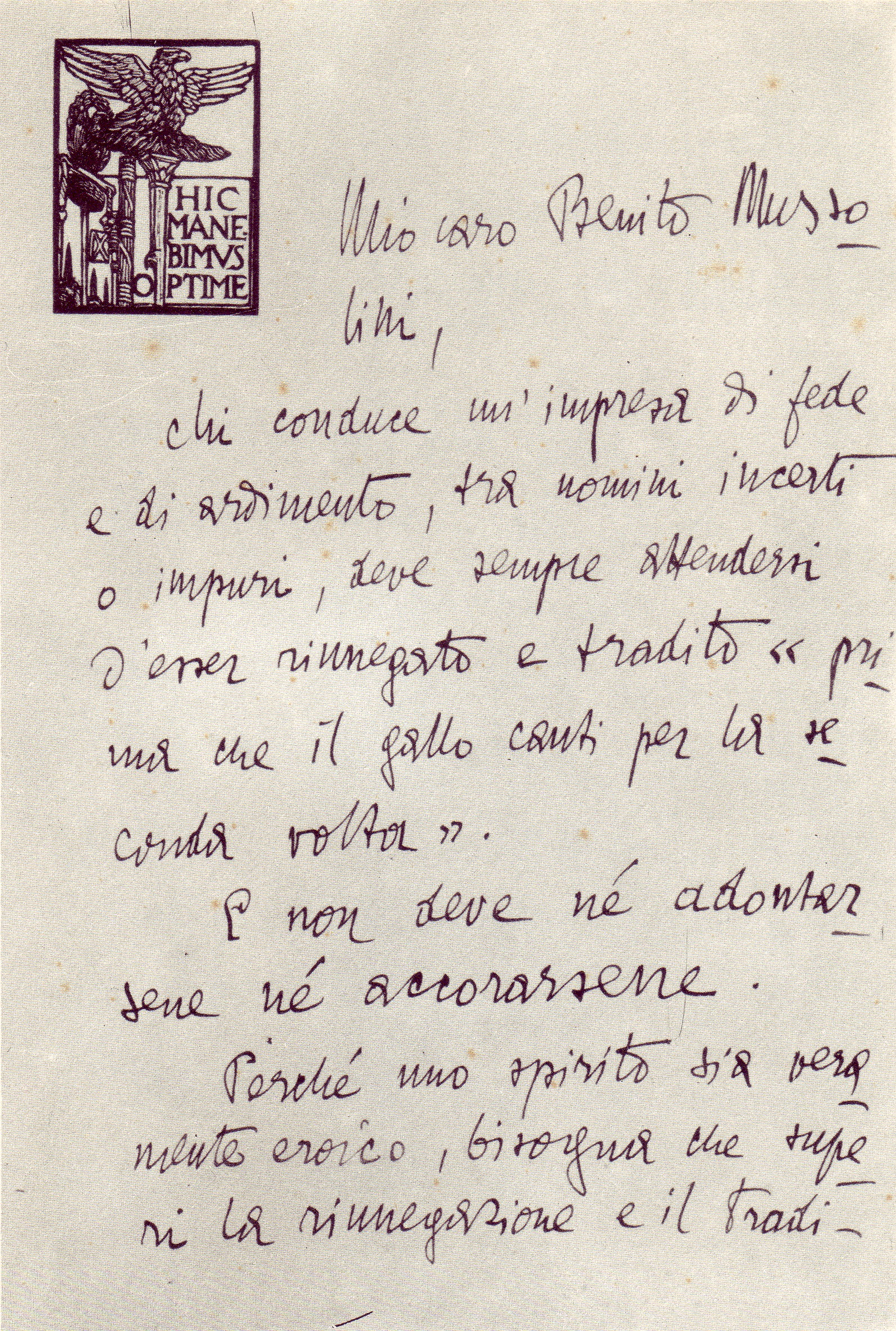
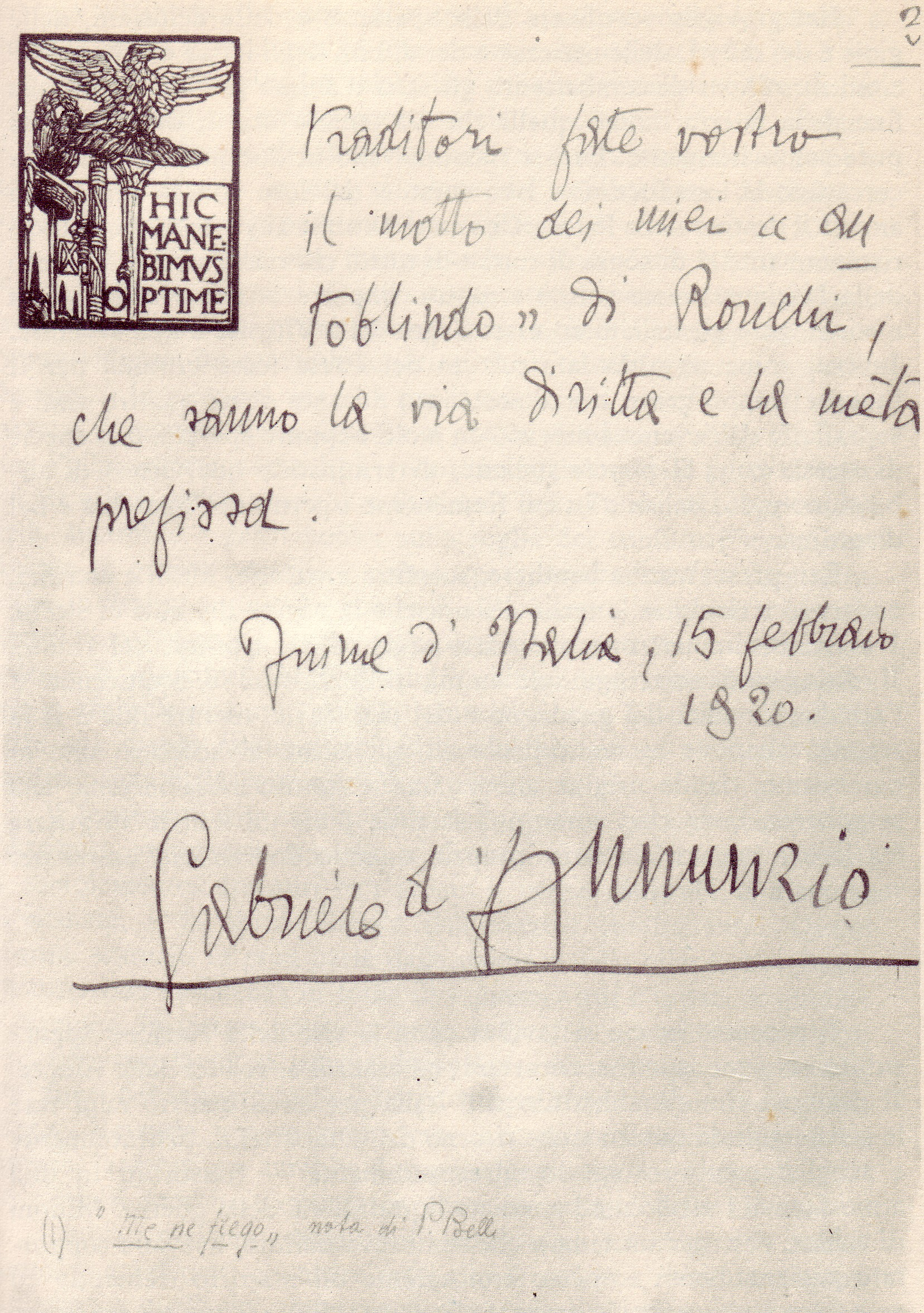
First and last sheet of D'Annunzio's letter to Mussolini, 15 February 1920

In his essay "Mussolini and The Cult of the Leader", John Whittam wrote:

Apart from Balbo, none of these contenders possessed charismatic personalities. One man did, however, and that was Gabriele D'Annunzio. This famous poet, novelist and war hero was a self-proclaimed Superman. He was the outstanding interventionist in May 1915, and his dramatic exploits during the war won him national and international acclaim. In September 1919, he gathered together his 'legions' and captured the disputed seaport of Fiume. He held it for over a year, and it was he who popularised the black shirts, the balcony speeches, the promulgation of ambitious charters and the entire choreography of street parades and ceremonies. He even planned a march on Rome. One historian had rightly described him as the 'First Duce', and Mussolini must have heaved a sigh of relief when he was driven from Fiume in December 1920, and his followers were dispersed. But he remained a threat to Mussolini, and in 1921, Fascists like Balbo seriously considered turning to him for leadership.

In contrast, Mussolini vacillated from left to right at this time. Although Mussolini's fascism was heavily influenced by the Charter of Carnaro, the constitution for Fiume written by Alceste De Ambris and D'Annunzio, neither wanted to play an active part in the new movement, both refusing when asked by Fascist supporters to run in the elections of 15 May 1921. Before the March on Rome, De Ambris even went so far as to depict the Italian fascist movement as "a filthy pawn in Mister Giolitti's game of chess, and made out of the least dignified section of the bourgeoisie".

D'Annunzio was seriously injured when he fell out of a window on 13 August 1922; subsequently, the planned "meeting for national pacification" with Francesco Saverio Nitti and Mussolini was cancelled. The incident was never explained and is considered by some historians to be an attempt to murder him, motivated by his popularity. Despite D'Annunzio's retreat from active public life after this event, Mussolini still found it necessary to regularly dole out funds to D'Annunzio as a bribe for not re-entering the political arena. When asked about this by a close friend, Mussolini purportedly stated: "When you have a rotten tooth you have two possibilities open to you: either you pull the tooth or you fill it with gold. With D'Annunzio, I have chosen for the latter treatment."

D'Annunzio kept attempting to intervene in politics almost until his death in 1938. He wrote to Mussolini in 1933 to try to convince him not to ally with Adolf Hitler. In 1934, he tried to disrupt the relationship between Hitler and Mussolini after their first meeting, even writing a satirical pamphlet about Hitler. In September 1937, D'Annunzio met with Mussolini at the Verona train station to try to convince him to leave the Axis powers.

== Literature ==
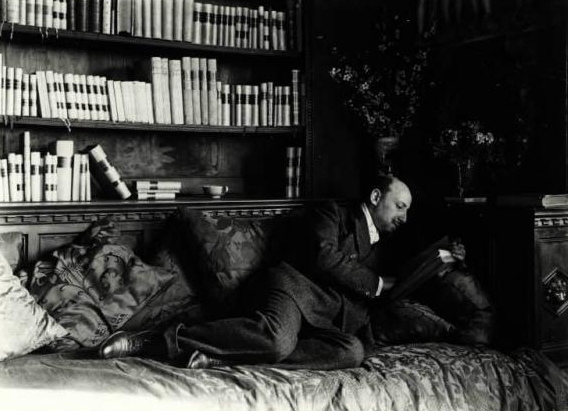
D'Annunzio reading in a photo by Mario Nunes Vais

At the height of his success, D'Annunzio was celebrated for the originality, power and decadence of his writing. Although his work had an immense impact across Europe and influenced generations of Italian writers, his fin de siècle works are now little known, and his literary reputation has always been clouded by nationalistic ideals, and he had his strong detractors. A New York Times review in 1898 of his novel The Intruder referred to him as "evil", "entirely selfish and corrupt". Three weeks into its December 1901 run at the Teatro Constanzi in Rome, his tragedy Francesca da Rimini was banned by the censor on grounds of morality.

A prolific writer, D'Annunzio's novels in Italian include Il piacere (The Child of Pleasure, 1889), Il trionfo della morte (The Triumph of Death, 1894), and Le vergini delle rocce (The Maidens of the Rocks, 1896). He wrote the screenplay to the feature film Cabiria (1914) based on episodes from the Second Punic War. D'Annunzio's literary creations were strongly influenced by the French Symbolist school, and contain episodes of striking violence and depictions of abnormal mental states interspersed with gorgeously imagined scenes. One of D'Annunzio's most significant novels, scandalous in its day, is Il fuoco (The Flame of Life) of 1900, in which he portrays himself as the Nietzschean Superman (Übermensch) Stelio Effrena, in a fictionalised account of his love affair with Eleonora Duse. His short stories showed the influence of Guy de Maupassant. He was also associated with the Italian noblewoman Luisa Casati, an influence on his novels and one of his mistresses.

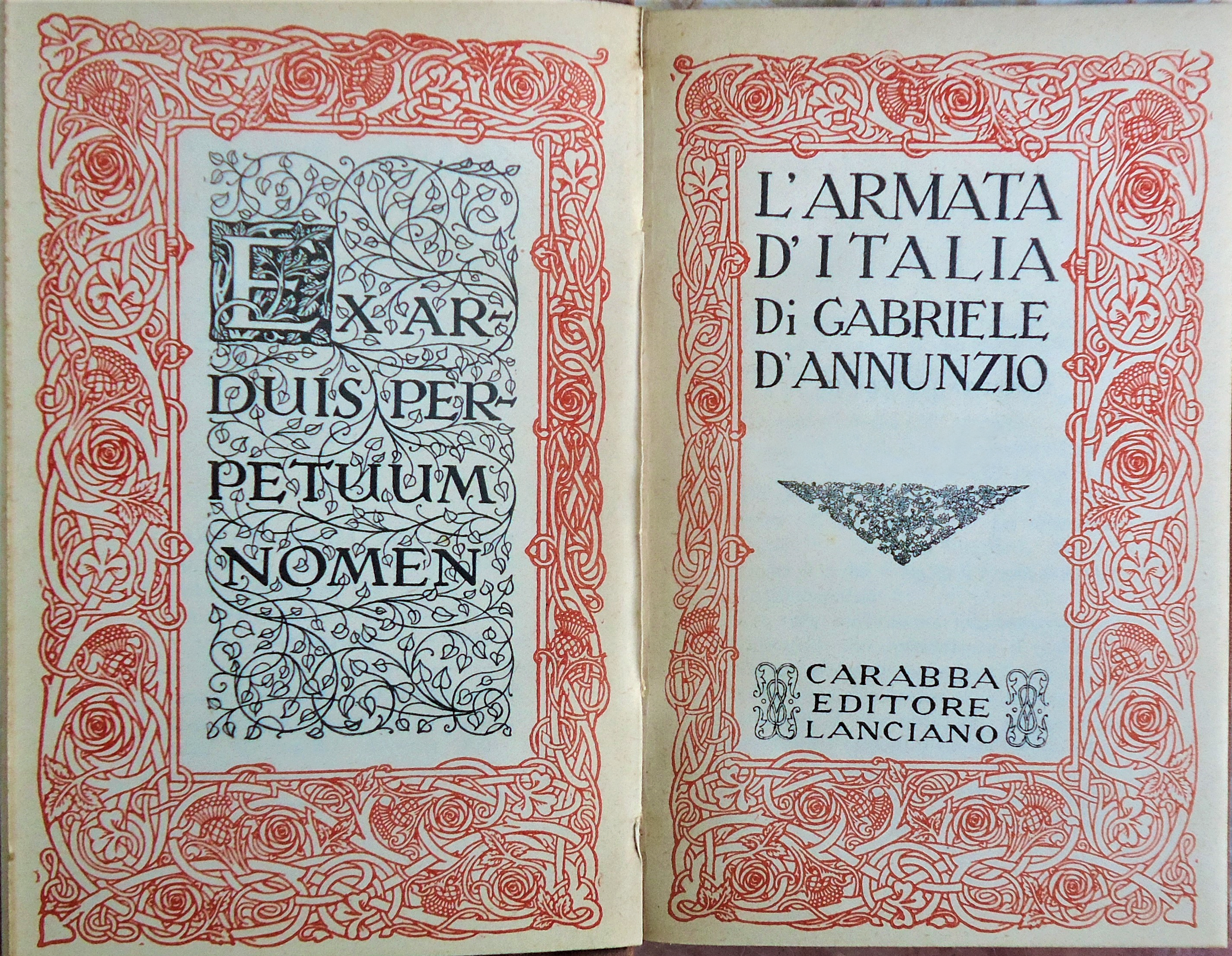
D'Annunzio's book L'armata d'Italia, published by Carabba in 1916

The 1911 Encyclopædia Britannica wrote of him:

The work of d' Annunzio, although by many of the younger generation injudiciously and extravagantly admired, is almost the most important literary work given to Italy since the days when the great classics welded her varying dialects into a fixed language. The psychological inspiration of his novels has come to him from many sources—French, Russian, Scandinavian, German—and in much of his earlier work, there is little fundamental originality.

His creative power is intense and searching, but narrow and personal; his heroes and heroines are little more than one type monotonously facing a different problem at a different phase of life. But the faultlessness of his style and the wealth of his language have been approached by none of his contemporaries, whom his genius has somewhat paralysed. In his later work [meaning as of 1911], when he begins drawing his inspiration from the traditions of bygone Italy in her glorious centuries, a current of real life seems to run through the veins of his personages. And the lasting merit of D'Annunzio, his real value to the literature of his country, consists precisely in that he opened up the closed mine of its former life as a source of inspiration for the present and of hope for the future, and created a language, neither pompous nor vulgar, drawn from every source and district suited to the requirements of modern thought, yet absolutely classical, borrowed from none, and, independently of the thought it may be used to express, a thing of intrinsic beauty. As his sight became clearer and his purpose strengthened, as exaggerations, affectations, and moods dropped away from his conceptions, his work became more and more typical Latin work, upheld by the ideal of an Italian Renaissance.

In Italy, some of D'Annunzio's poetic works remain popular, most notably his poem La pioggia nel pineto ("The Rain in the Pinewood"), which exemplifies his linguistic virtuosity as well as the sensuousness of his poetry. His work was part of the literature event in the art competition at the 1912 Summer Olympics.

== Museums ==
D'Annunzio's life and work are commemorated in a museum, Il Vittoriale degli Italiani ("The Shrine of the Italian People's Victories"). He planned and developed it himself, adjacent to his villa at Gardone Riviera on the southwest bank of Lake Garda, between 1923 and his death. Now a national monument, it is a complex of military museum, library, literary and historical archive, theatre, war memorial and mausoleum. The museum preserves his torpedo boat MAS 96 and the SVA-5 aircraft he flew over Vienna. His birthplace is also open to the public as a museum, Birthplace of Gabriele D'Annunzio Museum in Pescara.

== Works ==
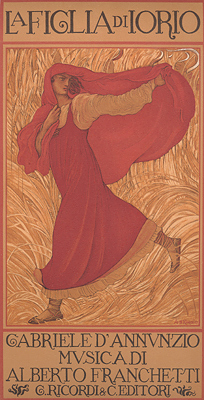
Poster by Adolfo de Carolis for Alberto Franchetti's opera La figlia di Iorio (1906)

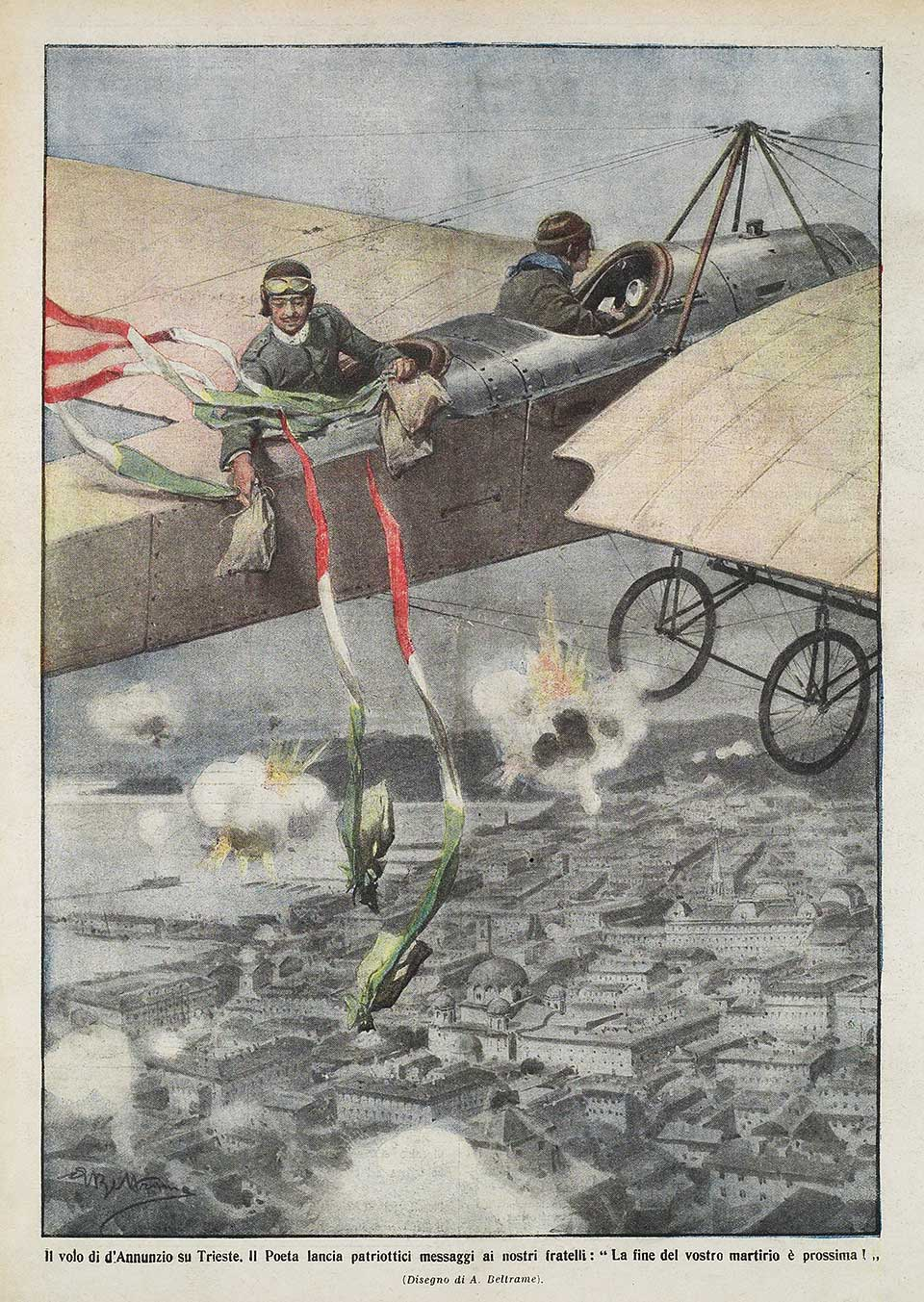
Pro-Italy messages that D'Annunzio threw from his aeroplane during his 1915 flight above Trieste

=== Novels ===
- Il Piacere (Pleasure, 1889)
- Giovanni Episcopo (1891)
- L'innocente (The Intruder (UK) or The Victim (US), 1892)
- Il trionfo della morte (The Triumph of Death, 1894)
- Le vergini delle rocce (The Maidens of the Rocks, 1895)
- Il fuoco (The Flame of Life: A Novel, 1900)
- Forse che sì forse che no (Maybe Yes, Maybe No, 1910)

=== Tragedies ===
- La città morta (The Dead City: a Tragedy, 1899)
- La Gioconda (Gioconda, 1899)
- Francesca da Rimini (1902),
- L'Etiopia in fiamme (1904)
- La figlia di Jorio (The Daughter of Jorio, 1904)
- La fiaccola sotto il moggio (The Torch Under the Bushel, 1905)
- La nave (1908).
- Fedra (1909)

=== Short story collections ===
- La Riscossa (1918), Bestetti e Tumminelli Edizioni d'Arte, first edition of warlike prayers held on the Italian front from November 1917 to May 1918, in No. 16, 171 pages, brochure original xylographed, frontispiece, and trim always engraved on wood by Sartorio
- Terra vergine (1882)
- Le novelle della Pescara (1884–1886)

=== Poetry collections ===
- Primo vere (1879)
- Canto novo (1882)
- Poema paradisiaco (1893)
- The five books of Laudi del cielo, del mare, della terra e degli eroi (1903–1912)
  - Maia (Canto Amebeo della Guerra)
  - Elettra
  - Alcyone
  - Merope
  - Asterope (La Canzone del Quarnaro)
- Ode alla nazione serba (1914)

=== Autobiographical works ===
- La Leda senza cigno
- Notturno
- Le faville del maglio
- Le cento e cento e cento e cento pagine del Libro Segreto di Gabriele D'Annunzio tentato di morire o Libro Segreto (as Angelo Cocles)

D'Annunzio's epistolary work, Solus ad solam, was published posthumously.

== Filmography ==
- Cabiria, directed by Giovanni Pastrone (1914) – screenplay
- La Nave directed by Gabriellino D'Annunzio (1921) – screenplay

== In popular culture ==
- D'Annunzio, directed by Sergio Nasca (1985) – about the romantic relationships in the life of the poet
- The Bad Poet, directed by Vincenzo Jodice (2020) – about the poet's last years
- Fiume o morte!, directed by Igor Bezinović (2025) – about D'Annunzio's takeover of Fiume. It premiered at the Rotterdam Film Festival.
- In the 2025 TV series Mussolini: Son of the Century, D'Annunzio is played by Paolo Pierobon.

== Legacy ==
The D'Annunzio University of Chieti–Pescara is named after him, as is the Brescia Airport. El Bayyada in Libya was founded as Villaggio D'Annunzio as a rural village to be populated by Italian colonists.

The Chilean poet Lucila Godoy Alcayaga, 1945 Nobel Prize in Literature, took the first name of her pseudonym, Gabriela Mistral, in his honour. The play Tamara is based on his meeting with the painter Tamara de Lempicka. Luchino Visconti's last film, The Innocent, is based on D'Annunzio's novel. The writer Ernesto Giménez Caballero was given the nickname the "Spanish D'Annunzio".

== Honours and awards ==
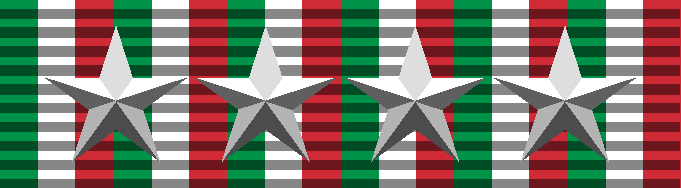

=== Italian ===
- Knight of the Military Order of Savoy

"As an air team leader in the flights of the August offensive, he was able, setting a magnificent example, to make the action coordinated and highly effective. In the battlefield of the sky, opposed by intense fire from every weapon, he dared the limits of human courage, striking the enemy from the lowest altitudes with very audacious persistence."
— Sky over the Karst, 19–26 August 1917

- Officer of the Military Order of Savoy

"Animator of every spirit, transfusing his faith and love into everyone, in a magnificent and superb mission he led a flight of brave men over Vienna, affirming in a hitherto unsurpassed way the power of the wings of Italy."
— Vienna sky, 9 August 1918

- Gold Medal of Military Valor

"Volunteer and war-maimed, during three years of bitter struggle, with animating faith, with tireless work, participating in very audacious undertakings, on land, on the sea, in the sky, the high intellect and the tenacious will of the purposes – in harmony of thought and action – entirely dedicated to the sacred ideals of the Fatherland, in the pure dignity of duty and sacrifice."
— War zone, May 1915–November 1918

- Silver Medal of Military Valor (first award)

"As an observer officer he voluntarily took part in various war missions carried out in enemy territory by seaplanes of the Regia Marine [Royal Navy], always maintaining an exemplary and courageous demeanor and constantly demonstrating cold-blooded and youthful courage even under enemy fire. During a landing he suffered a serious injury to his right eye."
— Adriatic, May 1915–February 1916

- Silver Medal of Military Valor (second award)

"During the actions from 10 to 12 October and from 1 to 3 November, he was a companion to the soldiers who conquered Veliki and Faiti. Enthusiastic and daring in every act of his, the example given was equal to the word and the effects obtained were effective and complete."
— Veliki Kribak, 10–12 October; Faiti Krib, 1–3 November 1916

- Silver Medal of Military Valor (third award)

"In the grand aerial feat he himself championed and in the harsh land combat he overcame on the Timavo, his courage amazed the brave men themselves."
— Karst sky-Timavo, 23–28 May 1917

- Bronze Medal of Military Valor (first award)

"In land[-based] aircraft, covering a long stretch of open sea, in adverse conditions, he managed, with others, to reach the mouth of Cattaro and hit the naval objectives with great accuracy and effectiveness, returning with all the others to base, despite the inevitable detours in the growing haze."
— Bay of Kotor 4–5 October 1917

- Bronze Medal of Military Valor (second award)

"An effective promoter, admirable for his faith and courage, a persevering example of military virtue, he voluntarily participated in the Buccari incursion."
— Bakar 10–11 February 1918

- War Merit Cross (three awards)
- Commemorative Medal of the Unity of Italy
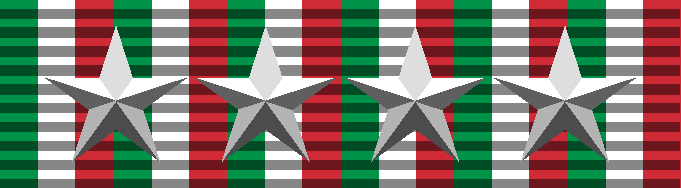
- Commemorative Medal for the Italo-Austrian War 1915–1918 (four years of campaign)
- Allied Victory Medal
- Commemorative Gold Medal of the Fiume Expedition

=== Foreign ===
- Knight of the Order of the Legion of Honour (France)
- Croix de guerre 1914–1918 (France)
- Military Cross (United Kingdom)

=== Badges of honour and merit ===
- War Merit Promotion Badge (two awards)
- Mutilated in War 1915–1918

=== Noble titles and honorary military ranks ===
- Prince of Montenevoso

— Conferred by Royal Decree of 15 March 1924 / 1915–1920

- Honorary Generale di Brigata Aerea ("Air Brigade General")

— Awarded by Royal Decree of 1925 / 1915–1918

- Honorary Appuntato ("Appointee") of the Guardia di Finanza ("Financial Police")

— Awarded by Royal Decree of 1925 / Fiume 25 June 1920

== See also ==
- Tom Antongini, D'Annunzio's private secretary for more than thirty years
- Maurice Barrès, a friend and literary-political kindred spirit of D'Annunzio
- The Pike: Gabriele D'Annunzio, Poet, Seducer and Preacher of War, a modern reappraisal of D'Annunzio's life and work

== Bibliography ==
- Bleiler, Everett (1948). The Checklist of Fantastic Literature. Chicago: Shasta Publishers. p. 22.
- Bufacchi, Emanuela (2005). "D'Annunzio, Gabriele". Enciclopedia dei ragazzi (in Italian). Rome: Italian Encyclopedia Institute.
- Carlino, Marcello (1986). "D'Annunzio, Gabriele". Dizionario Biografico degli Italiani (in Italian). Vol. 32. Rome: Italian Encyclopedia Institute.
- Comes, Salvatore (1970). "D'Annunzio, Gabriele". Enciclopedia Dantesca (in Italian). Rome: Italian Encyclopedia Institute.
- "D'Annunzio, Gabriele". Enciclopedia Italiana (in Italian). Vol. XII, I Appendice. Rome: Italian Encyclopedia Institute. 1938. p. 322.
- "D'Annunzio, Gabriele". Dizionario di Storia (in Italian). Rome: Italian Encyclopedia Institute. 2010.
- "D'Annùnzio, Gabriele". Treccani (in Italian). Rome: Italian Encyclopedia Institute. 2011.
- Matt, Luigi (2010). "D'Annunzio, Gabriele". Enciclopedia dell'Italiano (in Italian). Rome: Italian Encyclopedia Institute.
- Russu, Luigi (1931). "D'Annunzio, Gabriele". Enciclopedia Italiana (in Italian). Rome: Italian Encyclopedia Institute.
- Stefanelli, Stefania (11 May 2018). "D'Annunzio, lessico e nuvole". Treccani (in Italian). Rome: Italian Encyclopedia Institute.
- Valentini, Valentina (2003). "D'Annunzio, Gabriele". Enciclopedia del Cinema (in Italian). Rome: Italian Encyclopedia Institute.

Attribution
