= Il trionfo della morte =

1894 novel by Gabriele D'Annunzio

Triumph of Death (Il trionfo della morte)
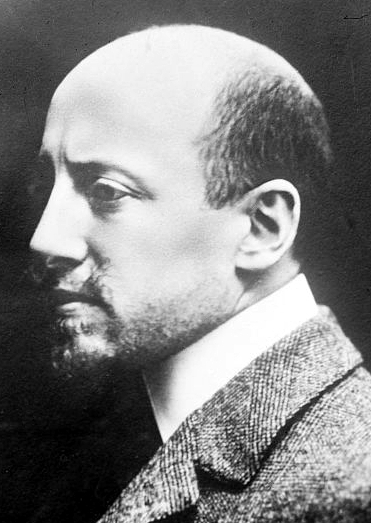
- picture of D'Annunzio
- Author: Gabriele D'Annunzio
- Original title: Il trionfo della morte
- Language: Italian
- Series: Romanzi della Rosa
- Genre: Novel
- Publisher: Treves
- Publication date: 1894
- Publication place: Italy
- Media type: Print (hardback & paperback)

Il trionfo della morte (Triumph of Death) is a novel by Gabriele D'Annunzio. It is the concluding volume in his "Romances of the Rose" trilogy.

This was the first of d'Annunzio's novels to be translated into English. The translation by Georgina Harding, published in 1898, made substantial changes and omissions to the original in order to avoid impropriety.

== Plot ==
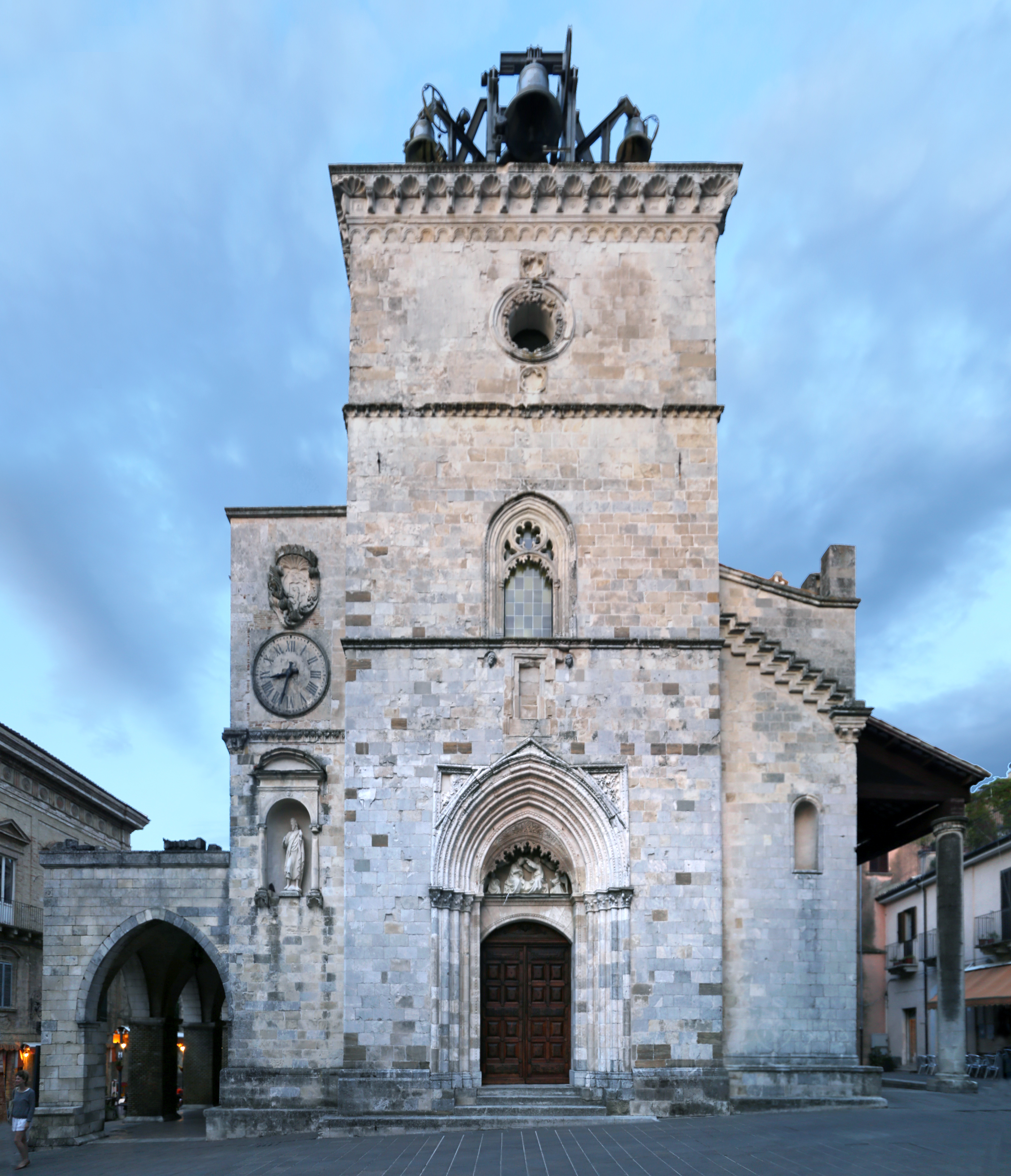
Cathedral of Guardiagrele

The story is set in the Abruzzo region, the birthplace of the author. The noble aesthete Giorgio Aurispa, besotted with his unhappily-married lover Ippolita, leaves Rome after witnessing a suicide. After a brief interlude with Ippolita in Albano, Giorgio receives a telegram from his mother, who lives in the small mountain village of Guardiagrele. Giorgio arrives in the beautiful city of stone, and is fascinated by the sculptures; however, he is equally haunted by popular superstitions and the memories of the suicide of his uncle Demetrio, whom he had loved as a father. Worse, Giorgio discovers that his actual father has squandered the family fortune, forcing his mother and siblings to live in poverty while he carries on with a prostitute. Giorgio curses his father, abandoning his family, and runs to the sea, buying a house on a hill in San Vito Chietino. Ippolita joins him, and the two pursue a summer of decadent languor marred only by Giorgio's developing paranoia towards her.

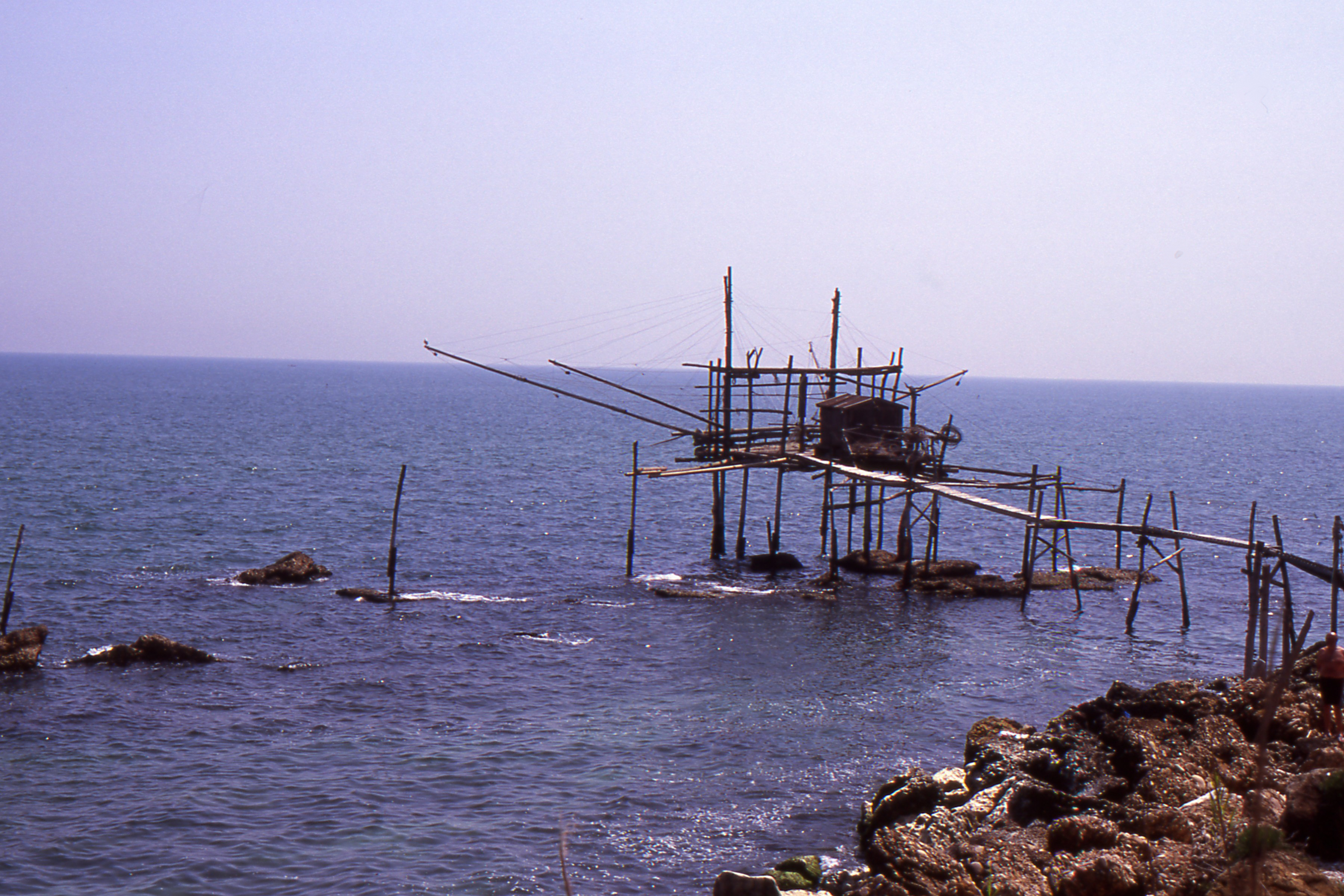
Trabucco of San Vito Chietino

Giorgio is additionally obsessed with death, and matters only become worse after the pair undertake a pilgrimage to the shrine of Casalbordino, where the multitude of desperate supplicants begging cures of the statue of the Madonna drives them away in horror. While Giorgio becomes more and more unmoored and desperate to leave both Abruzzo and what he perceives as Ippolita's unwholesome influence, she remains amused and fascinated by their surroundings. Finally Giorgio decides that his only recourse is to carry her over a seaside cliff, killing the both of them.

== Topics: the D'Annunzio's superman ==
In the novel is the theme of Nietzsche's superman, glimpsed by D'Annunzio in a new way. The superman of d'Annunzio is a cultured esthete, who loves only art, and we dedicate ourselves with all his being. He is believed to dominate nature with his power, and sets out to conquer nature with a companion. This companion of love, however, is a femme fatale, which leads him to the precipice. The superman of d'Annunzio is in fact surrounded by a reality that is not his: a monstrous reality of people without quality: the common people and the middle class, always averse to d'Annunzio. The only source of power comes from the art of the superman, but when the esthete of D'Annunzio has to deal with the grim reality, it happens that the protagonist is beaten mercilessly.
