= Emeric Bergeaud =

Haitian novelist (1818–1858)

Emeric Bergeaud (c. 1818–1858) was a Haitian novelist. His best-known work, Stella, was the first Haitian novel. Born in Cayes, he served as Secretary to Jerome Maximilien Borgella and later participated in a revolt against President Soulouque. Exiled to Saint Thomas, it was there that he wrote the novel Stella. Marlene Daut has recently revealed in Tropics of Haiti: Race and the Literary History of the Haitian Revolution in the Atlantic World, 1789-1865, that three Haitian journalists and writers from the early twentieth-century, Ulrick Duvivier, Frédéric Marcelin, and Louis Morpeau, suspected or more likely erroneously believed that Stella was actually authored by Bergeaud's wife (413–14, ftn. 2). At the present time, there is no other known evidence that supports the claims of Duvivier, Marcelin, and Morpeau.
