= The Intruder (D'Annunzio novel) =

1892 novel by Gabriele D'Annunzio

The Intruder (Italian: L'Innocente) is an 1892 novel by the Italian writer Gabriele D'Annunzio. It is known as The Victim in the United States. It tells the story of the dandy Tullio Hermil who is habitually unfaithful to his patient and loving wife Giuliana, until the wife eventually does the same and becomes pregnant with another man's child. The book was published in English in 1897, translated by Georgina Harding.

The book was first adapted for film in 1912 by Edoardo Bencivenga. It was also the basis for Luchino Visconti's last film, The Innocent, released in 1976. Visconti's version stars Giancarlo Giannini as Tullio and Laura Antonelli as Giuliana.
