= Military history of Haiti =

The origins of the military history of Haiti lie in the country's revolution. A decade of warfare produced a military cadre from which Haiti's early leaders emerged. Defeat of the French demonstrated Haiti's considerable strategic stamina and tactical capabilities. The armed forces, who had been united against the French, fragmented into warring regional factions. The military very soon took control of almost every aspect of Haitian life. Officers assumed responsibility for the administration of justice and for municipal management. According to a Haitian diplomat, the country was in its earlier days "an immense military camp." Without viable civilian institutions, Haiti was vulnerable to military personalities, who permanently shaped the nation's authoritarian, personalist, and coercive style of governance.

== Early 20th century ==
During the latter half of the nineteenth century, the army either failed to protect the central government or directly caused the government's collapse. Rural insurgent movements led by piquets and cacos limited the central government's authority in outlying areas. These groups carried on war into the twentieth century; they were finally put down by the United States Marines in 1919.

Prolonged instability weakened the military. By the end of the nineteenth century, Haiti's military had become little more than an undisciplined, ill-fed, and poorly paid militia that shifted its allegiances as battles were won or lost and as new leaders came to power. Between 1806 and 1879, an estimated 69 revolts against existing governments took place; another 20 uprisings, or attempted insurrections, broke out between 1908 and 1915. At the beginning of the twentieth century, Haiti's political problems attracted increasing foreign involvement. France, Germany, and the United States were the major actors; the latter occupied the country in 1915. During the occupation, the United States made an unsuccessful attempt to modernize Haiti's armed forces.

The United States Marines disbanded Haiti's army, which consisted of an estimated 9,000 men, including 308 generals. In February 1916, the Haitian Constabulary (Gendarmerie of Haiti) was formed. United States Marine and United States Navy officers and non-commissioned officers (NCOs) commanded the group. The Gendarmerie attempted to secure public safety, initially by subduing the cacos; to promote development, particularly road construction; and to modernize the military through the introduction of a training structure, a health service, and other improvements.

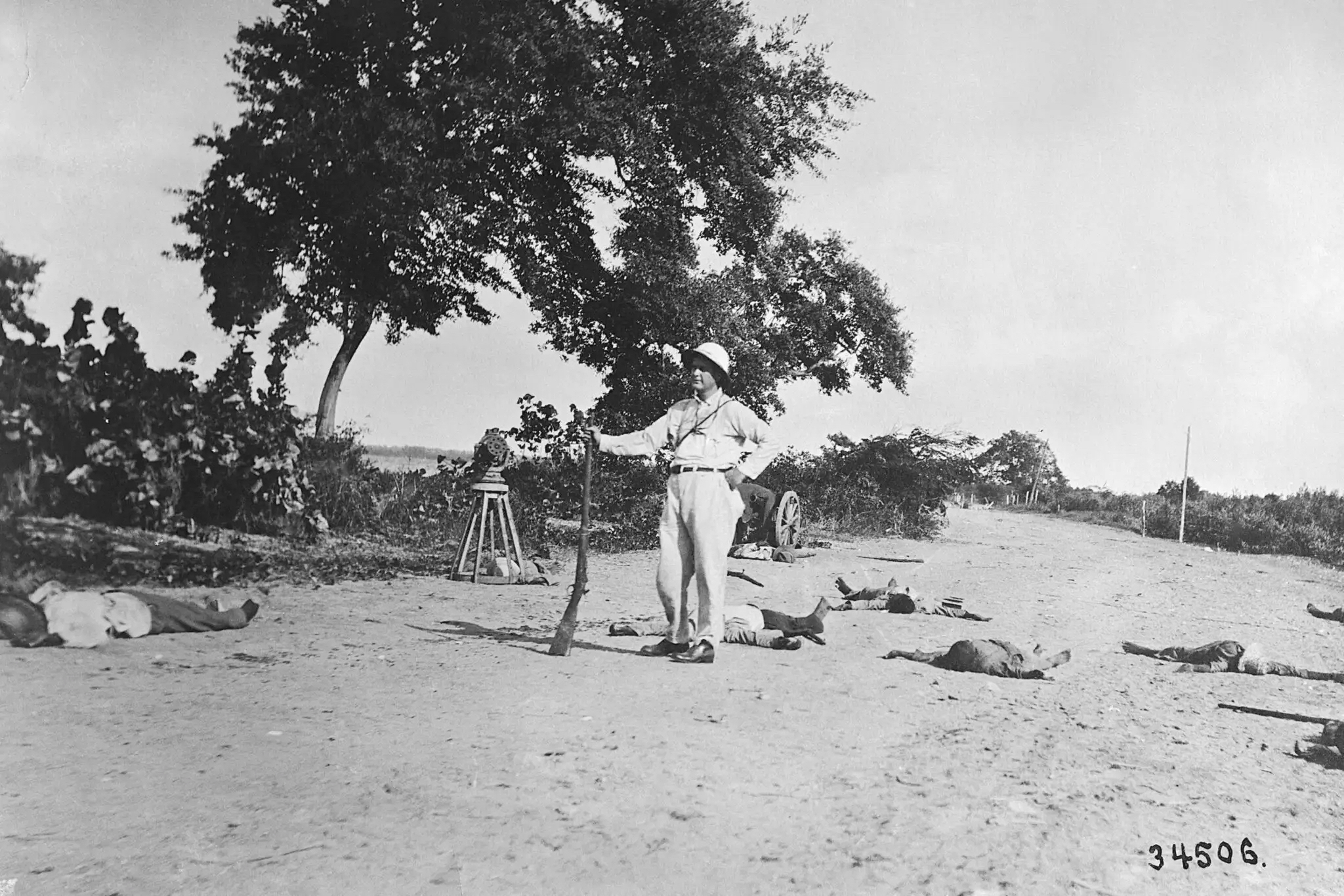
An American poses next to dead Haitian revolutionaries killed during an engagement with US marines during the American occupation of Haiti, November 1915

The United States administration of Haiti (1915–34) brought order and resulted in some economic and social development. At the same time, the United States overhauled Haiti's disintegrated military infrastructure. The Gendarmerie became the Garde d'Haïti in 1928; the Garde formed the core of Haiti's armed forces after the United States administration ended. The United States sought to establish a modern, apolitical military force in Haiti. On the surface, it succeeded; the organization, the training, and the equipment of the Garde all represented improvements over the military conditions existing before the occupation. However, the occupation resulted in decades-long political corruption and instability in the country.

== Latter 20th century ==
Some professionalization of the army continued for a few years after the United States occupation, but Haiti's political structure deteriorated rapidly after 1934, weakening civilmilitary relations and ultimately affecting the character of the armed forces. After the coup of 1946 and after Colonel Paul E. Magloire's election to the presidency in 1950, the army again assumed a political role. This development divided the army internally, and it set the stage for François Duvalier's ascent to power in late 1957 (see Politics and the Military, 1934–57, ch. 6).

During the three decades of despotic Duvalier rule, a parallel security force, the VSN (commonly known as Tonton Macoute) emerged. The Duvaliers maintained control of the country through this brutal force, which was independent of the armed forces. Both Duvaliers lacked military experience; still, they managed to neutralize the army's influence through intimidation, bribery, and political maneuvering. The Duvaliers also managed to stave off a number of low-level opposition plots and invasion attempts, mostly during the 1960s.

=== Korean War (1951–54) ===
At the time of the Korean War, the United States Deputy Representative at the United Nations Ernest A. Gross approached several member states for voluntary troop contributions to the United Nations police action in the Korean Peninsula. The Representative of Haiti, Ambassador Ernest G. Chauvet, informed Gross that his government at the time did not have a standing "army"; In the early 1950s, the Haitian Armed Forces were the "Haitian Guard" or «Garde d'Haïti» (successor to the Gendarmerie of Haiti), which was closer to a gendarmerie than an army. Chauvet still offered to gather volunteers "without difficulty", who would be trained and transported by others.

By late 1951 Haiti would be one of only 6 nations to offered specific contingents to the already present UN Forces in Korea, upon request from the Collective Measures Committee (CMC) under Article 43. A small contingent of Haitian combat troops, embedded with U.S. forces, would join the war against the communist forces of North Korea and China. In 1955, the United States Department of the Army would present military decoration to 10 members of Latin American Forces: Colonel Roger Villedrouin of Haiti would be awarded the Legion of Merit presented by President Dwight D. Eisenhower.

=== François Duvalier (1957–71) ===
When François Duvalier came to power in 1957, the armed forces were at their lowest point, professionally, since 1915. Internal tension stemmed from political, generational, and racial divisions within the army command. The leadership of the former Garde d'Haïti, trained by the United States Marines, was aging and was slowly giving way to a younger cadre of Military Academy graduates from the 1940s. Duvalier hastened this process by retiring a group of senior officers and promoting a number of junior officers. Duvalier's establishment of a parallel security apparatus posed the most serious challenge to the crumbling integrity of the armed forces. In late 1958, Duvalier reinstated, and took direct control of, the Presidential Guard (Garde Présidentielle), and he eliminated the Maison Militaire (military household), which had served as the presidential security unit before the Duvalier era. In 1959 the regime began recruiting a civilian militia (Milice Civile), ostensibly as an adjunct to the Presidential Guard. Drawn initially from the capital city's slums and equipped with antiquated small arms found in the basement of the Presidential Palace, the civilian militia, commonly known as the "Tonton Macoutes", became the VSN after 1962. The VSN's control extended into the countryside, through a system of information, intelligence, and command tied directly to the Presidential Palace.

The armed forces yielded political power to the new regime and lost many of their institutionalized features, developed during the previous thirty years. Duvalier closed down the Military Academy in 1961. A professional and elitist institution, the academy represented a potential source of opposition to the regime. Officers who attempted to resist Duvalier forfeited their careers. In 1963 Duvalier expelled the United States military mission, which he had invited to Haiti in 1959, because he believed that military-modernization values imparted by United States instructors could lead to resistance to the government's restructuring of the armed forces.

Duvalier succeeded in overpowering the mainstream military establishment, but the process was painful; it required several abrupt attacks. For example, Duvalier eliminated, or exiled, anyone who opposed him. Duvalier's ruthlessness and suspicion caused members of his own security apparatus to turn against him - most notably Clément Barbot, one of the original VSN chiefs.

By the mid-1960s, the VSN and the army routinely cooperated on internal security matters, even though the two groups were suspicious of each other. There were occasional lapses in the security apparatus, however. In 1967 several bombs exploded near the palace, and the regime subsequently executed nineteen officers of the Presidential Guard. In 1970 the entire membership of Haiti's small Coast Guard staged an abortive mutiny.

The regime referred to the VSN as a militia. This designation masked the organization's role as the Duvalier's front-line security force. The VSN acted as political cadres, secret police, and instruments of terror. In addition, they played a crucial political role for the regime: they countered the influence of the armed forces, historically the nation's foremost institutional power. François Duvalier went farther than any of his predecessors in his efforts to reduce the ability of the military to influence selection of the country's leaders. The VSN's success in keeping the army and the rest of Haitian society in check created what has been described as a VSN-led "parabureaucracy."

The VSN gained its deadly reputation partially because its members received no salary, even though they worked for the National Palace (Palais National). They made their livings, instead, through extortion and petty crime. Rural members of the VSN, who wore blue denim uniforms, had received some training from the army, while the plainclothed members, with their dark glasses, served as Haiti's criminal-investigation force (see Public Order, this ch.).

=== Jean-Claude Duvalier (1971–86) ===
When Jean-Claude Duvalier ("Baby Doc") came to power in 1971, the country's security forces became less abusive, but they still used some brutality. During Jean-Claude's regime, the balance between the VSN and the armed forces changed. The new regime sought to realign these competing power bases, if only to ensure control over the nation's security apparatus. Furthermore, Jean-Claude's half-hearted attempt to open Haiti to the outside world and to secure renewed foreign assistance from the United States suggested a need to restrain the abuses of the VSN, which included more than 9,000 members and an informal circle of thousands in early 1986.

The creation of the Leopards counterinsurgency unit, with United States' support, provided the regime with a relatively modern tool for responding to internal threats. The Leopards also provided Baby Doc with a new force, the capability and the allegiance of which bridged the gap between the armed forces and the VSN. A reorganization integrated some senior VSN members into the army, effecting a partial merger of Haiti's two security institutions. In 1972 the Military Academy reopened, and a politically well-connected class—the first since 1961—graduated in 1973. The reopening of the academy represented a small step toward reprofessionalizing the military. Some modernization of army equipment was also undertaken during this period.

The armed forces entered the 1980s as a mere shadow of the powerful, disciplined, trained institution that had existed forty years earlier. Although the army successfully repelled a number of attempts against the regime, it ultimately failed to prevent Duvalier's fall under pressure from his own populace. With lastminute assistance from the United States, the army's senior leadership provided the political transition required to ease Duvalier out of power in February 1986. A number of senior officers pushed for Duvalier's abdication, despite strong resistance from Jean-Claude and the senior leadership of the VSN. The army was interested in protecting itself from the explosive sociopolitical situation in Haiti in late 1985 and early 1986. Nationalism and concern for the best interests of Haiti exerted only a secondary influence on the officers' actions.

The armed forces largely escaped the immediate wrath of a population clearly bent on putting an end to Duvalier rule. Popular violence and anti-Duvalier protests had erupted in 1984, and it continued into early 1986 in an expanding sequence of local revolts. In its waning days, the regime relied heavily on the VSN and on limited local police capabilities to curb violence. Many Haitians detected the fissures growing in the nation's security apparatus, and some rumors held that the army would move against Duvalier. These rumors, however, proved incorrect; still, Duvalier's inability to contain the widespread rioting through political measures and the VSN's failure to control the unrest placed the military in a pivotal position. Conscious of his precarious hold on power, Duvalier reshuffled the cabinet and the military leadership in the last days of 1985, but to no avail. Reports of brutal excesses by the increasingly desperate VSN further weakened Duvalier's position.

The army became discontent with the crumbling regime. In several instances, troops refused to fire on demonstrators, and in a few cases, army personnel turned against the VSN. According to one account, several senior military figures threatened Duvalier and his wife, Michèle Duvalier, at gunpoint.

=== Post-Duvalier period (1986–2000) ===
Jean-Claude Duvalier left behind a hastily constructed interim junta, controlled by the armed forces. Lieutenant General Henri Namphy, army chief of staff, became head of the interim National Council of Government (Conseil Nationale de Gouvernement—CNG). Colonel Williams Regala, the head of the Military Academy; Lieutenant General Prosper Avril of the Presidential Guard; and Colonel Jean-Claude Paul of the regular army were also key figures in the interim government. The CNG officially disbanded the VSN a few days after Duvalier's departure, but it avoided the politically difficult measure of effectively halting the VSN's activities. This nonfeasance prompted angry mobs to murder known members of the VSN and set in motion a cycle of instability from which Haiti had yet to recover in the late 1980s. Despite the popular backlash, some members of the VSN managed to survive by integrating themselves into military circles.

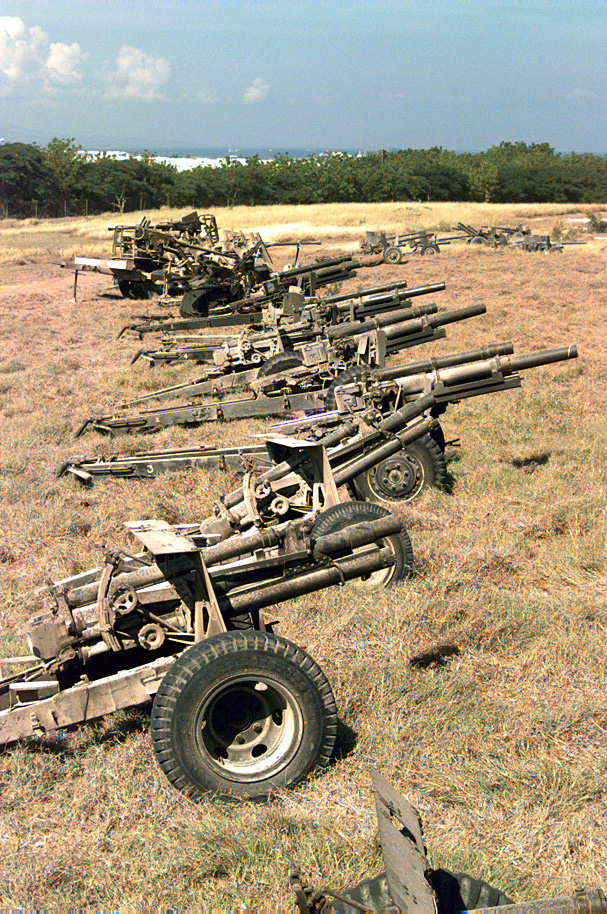
Artillery pieces confiscated by the United States from the Haitian Army during Operation Uphold Democracy in 1994

The consequences of the army's failure to dismantle the VSN became obvious in the bloody events leading up to the aborted elections of November 1987 (see Background: From Duvalier to Avril, 1957–89, ch. 9). The CNG's attempt to balance demands for, and resistance to, reforms gave way to chaos. By 1987 the armed forces had lost the favorable reputation they had enjoyed a year earlier. Worse, the senior military command appeared to be doing little to stop attacks against the electoral process. The disastrous elections of 1987 and 1988 isolated the Haitian military from the international community, which had grown skeptical about the role of the armed forces.

The situation unraveled further in 1988, under the short-lived civilian government of Leslie Manigat (February–June 1988), who was overthrown during the June 1988 Haitian coup d'état when he retired the Port-au-Prince police chief and attempted to reshuffle the army command. CNG leader Namphy returned as head of government, with the support of other commanders. A September 1988 Haitian coup d'état brought Prosper Avril to power. Avril was an experienced officer with a career dating back to the Duvalier era.

The armed forces continued to face problems, however, even after Avril came to power. From September 1988 through March 1989, 140 officers reportedly were retired or were fired, some because they were suspected of drug smuggling. Allegations that government officials were involved in drug trafficking became widely known after a United States court indicted Colonel Jean-Claude Paul, then commander of the Dessalines Battalion, on charges of cocaine distribution. Paul's wife had previously been arrested in Miami on cocaine charges. Paul's mysterious death in the fall of 1988 only partially resolved the issue of military involvement in drug trafficking. At about the same time, United States authorities arrested and convicted a former CNG associate of Namphy, Colonel Gary Léon, on drug-trafficking charges.

Avril's attempts to purge the government of Duvalierist forces included ousting individuals who had graduated from the Military Academy in 1973. The move reflected additional political rifts within the senior command. Sensing the low stature of the Avril government, segments of the senior command split into warring factions in April 1989. Reports alleged that proDuvalierist elements had helped to provoke dissension within the officer corps. The loyalty of the Presidential Guard and support from many NCOs helped Avril prevail in a week of internecine conflict with the officer corps. The conflict, however, left the military in a state of crisis. Duvalier's collapse initially had enhanced the national standing of the FAd'H. But the group's senior commanders, when thrust by events to the forefront of governance, had reverted to the traditional use of force to carry out a vaguely defined political program. Other actors, such as the Roman Catholic Church or political parties, remained divided in the post–1986 period, and they were therefore generally ineffectual politically (see Interest Groups, ch. 9). The failure of Haiti's civilian leadership to negotiate an alternative political course further reinforced the FAd'H's self-characterization as the decisive agent of Haitian affairs.

== 21st century ==
Beginning in 2011, the Haitian government began the process of the reestablishment of the Haitian army.

== History of the General Staff (after 2017) ==
Note: prior to 2024, G1/G3 were paired together, so was G2/G4.

=== Deputy Commander in Chief ===
- Major General Jonas Jean (2024–)

=== Chief of the General Staff ===
- Brigadier General Sadrac Saintil (2017–2024)
- Brigadier General Emmanuel Azémar (2024–)

=== Inspector General ===
- Colonel Jonas Jean (2017-2024) (promoted to Deputy Commander-in-Chief in 2024)
- Brigadier General Jean Robert Gabriel (2024–)

=== Assistant Chief of General Staff(G1) ===
- Colonel Jean Robert Gabriel (2017–2024) (promoted to Inspector General)
- Colonel Jean Garry Greffin (2024–)

=== Assistant Chief of General Staff(G2) ===
- Colonel Derby Guerrier (2017–2024) (promoted to Commander-in-Chief in 2024)
- Colonel Edwin Florexil (2024–)

=== Assistant Chief of General Staff (G3) ===
- Colonel Jean Robert Gabriel (2017–2024) (promoted to Inspector General)
- Colonel Néoclès P. Arné (2024–)

=== Assistant Chief of General Staff (G4) ===
- Colonel Derby Guerrier (2017–2024) (promoted to Commander-in-Chief in 2024)
- Colonel Fontane Beaubien (2024–)

=== Secretary of the General Staff ===
- Colonel Jean Jacques Thomas ✝ (2017–2025)
- Lieutenant colonel Charles Pierre (2025–)

== See also ==
- History of Haiti
- List of revolutions and coups d'état in Haiti
