= Illegal drug trade in Haiti =

The illegal drug trade in Haiti involves trans-shipment of cocaine and marijuana to the United States. The island of Hispaniola, which Haiti shares with the Dominican Republic, is situated along a major shipping route for drug smuggling between Colombia and Puerto Rico. Because Puerto Rico is a Commonwealth of the United States, shipments are generally not subject to further U.S. Customs inspection after reaching the territory. Cocaine is also often smuggled directly to Miami in freighters.

U.S. government agencies estimate that 83 metric tons or about eight percent of the cocaine entering the United States in 2006 transited either Haiti or the Dominican Republic. Throughout the late 1980s and into the 1990s, leading members of the Haitian military, intelligence and police were involved in the illegal drug trade in Haiti, assisting Colombian drug traffickers smuggling drugs into the United States. Corruption in Haiti remains extremely high, and suspicions of continued drug-related corruption remain.

== Developments ==
According to Haitian security expert Michel Laguerre, Haiti became internationally significant in cocaine trafficking in 1985. According to 1994 testimony to the U.S. Senate by Gabriel Taboada of the Colombian Medellin cartel, a deal had been sealed with Michel François, commander of the Haitian police, in a 1984 visit to Medellin by François. François and other military commanders were said to have protected 70,000 pounds of cocaine shipments in 1999.

François was said to have had a landing strip for cocaine shipments built on the property of Col. Jean-Claude Paul, and been paid between $1m and $4m. Taboada also identified General Prosper Avril as involved. Other Colombian traffickers (Enrique Arroyave and Carlos Marcantoni) identified François and General Raoul Cédras as among a group of Haitian military attending a 1987 party in Colombia held to celebrate the Colombia-Haiti drug connection's shipment of 66,000 pounds of cocaine.

After the 1986 overthrow of Jean-Claude Duvalier the U.S. Central Intelligence Agency created the Service d'Intelligence National (SIN), a Haitian intelligence agency. The unit, staffed by officers of the Haitian army, "engaged in drug trafficking and political violence". The CIA provided half a million to a million dollars per year to train SIN in counter-narcotics, but the group produced no intelligence and instead used their training against political opponents.

Allegations emerged of drug trafficking reaching into the upper echelons of government, as it had done under the military regimes of the 1980s and early 1990s (illegal drug trade in Haiti). Canadian police arrested Oriel Jean, Aristide's security chief and one of his most trusted friends, for money laundering. Beaudoin Ketant, a notorious international drug trafficker, Aristide's close partner, and his daughter's godfather, claimed that Aristide "turned the country into a narco-country; it's a one-man show; you either pay (Aristide) or you die".

== See also ==
- Crime in Haiti
