= 1991 Haitian coup d'état =

1991 overthrow of President Jean-Bertrand Aristide

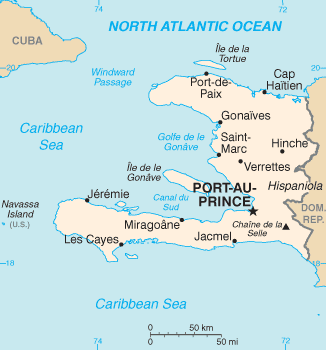
- A CIA WFB map of Haiti
- Date: 29–30 September 1991
- Location: Haiti, primarily Port-au-Prince; 18°32′N 72°20′W
- Goals: Removal of Jean-Bertrand Aristide
- Methods: Military coup
- Result: Coup succeeds: Jean-Bertrand Aristide exiled to Venezuela; Joseph Nérette installed as provisional president; Jean-Jacques Honorat installed as prime minister

Parties
Government of Haiti	Haitian Armed Forces

Lead figures
Jean-Bertrand Aristide	Raoul Cédras; Michel François

Casualties
- Deaths: 26 (initial New York Times estimate); 300 to 500 (United States Department of State); 1,500 (Amnesty International)

The 1991 Haitian coup d'état resulted in the overthrow of Jean-Bertrand Aristide, the democratically-elected president of Haiti, by a contingent of the Haitian military led by General Raoul Cédras and Chief of National Police Michel François. The coup began on 29 September 1991, when Haitian troops mutinied, launching a violent takeover that involved attacking Aristide's residence, committing massacres, and ultimately forcing Aristide into exile in Venezuela. Cédras announced the military's takeover on 30 September.

Prior to the coup, beginning in 1957, Haiti was ruled by the dictatorships of François and Jean-Claude Duvalier. Amidst political violence and growing poverty, an opposition movement began to form. Aristide arose as a prominent figure within this movement, participating in the protests that forced Jean-Claude to flee Haiti in 1986. After Jean-Claude's overthrow, Haiti was controlled by a series of military-dominated governments, but popular movements such as Aristide's Lavalas (transl. 'Avalanche') continued to mobilize, leading to Aristide's victory in the 1990–91 Haitian general election. As president, Aristide implemented populist and social democratic reforms focused on aiding Haiti's poor, which generated significant opposition from the military, wealthy elites, and the United States.

After the coup, the military regime unleashed widespread violence, killing thousands of Aristide supporters, displacing hundreds of thousands, targeting independent media and political opponents, and driving a mass exodus of Haitian refugees to the United States by boat. Aristide, with the support of Venezuelan President Carlos Andrés Pérez, mobilized international organizations, including the Organization of American States (OAS) and United Nations (UN), to condemn the military regime. These organizations imposed sanctions on Haiti that severely impacted its economy. Despite internal opposition from agencies like the CIA, which allegedly undermined Aristide's return and supported the anti-Aristide Front for the Advancement and Progress of Haïti (FRAPH), the United States ultimately threatened military action against the regime and, after a last-minute diplomatic effort, led Operation Uphold Democracy to successfully remove it and reinstate Aristide.

== Background ==
=== Overthrow of the Duvaliers ===
In 1957, François Duvalier became president of Haiti. His presidency saw an escalation of state violence deployed by the Tonton Macoute, a paramilitary and secret police force that targeted Duvalier's political opponents, resulting in an estimated 20,000 to 60,000 deaths. On 14 June 1964, Duvalier declared himself president for life. As his health began to decline in early 1971, he named his adolescent son, Jean-Claude Duvalier, his successor, establishing a hereditary dictatorship. Jean-Claude became president after François died on 21 April 1971. Upon taking office, he pledged an "economic revolution" focused on modernization and liberalization. His regime attracted foreign aid and investment but was marred by accusations of diverted aid and forced labor.

Throughout the 1970s, a mass opposition movement to the Duvaliers had been developing. This movement gained greater momentum during the 1980s. By 1985, many Haitians were experiencing chronic malnutrition and deep poverty. In total, 24,000 people—1–2% of the population—owned about 40% of the country's wealth. Jean-Bertrand Aristide, a Salesian priest who ministered a church in the slums of Port-au-Prince, distinguished himself among those who opposed the regime. Influenced by the liberation theology of theologians like Jon Sobrino and Leonardo Boff, Aristide joined Ti Legliz (transl. 'Little Church'), a coalition of Catholic groups that advocated for democracy and human rights.

In February 1984, deadly clashes erupted in Gonaïves, Artibonite, as crowds stormed an aid warehouse and the local police station and prison. In 1985, student protests also erupted in Gonaïves. Haitian Army troops fired on the protesters, killing at least three and causing the United States to suspend aid. As both resistance and repression intensified in late 1985, the United States Department of State warned in December 1985 that it would fully cut off aid unless political conditions improved. In January 1986, protests spread across the country, bolstered by Ti Legliz. Late that month, the army issued orders to soldiers telling them to refrain from shooting at protesters, signaling the withdrawal of its support for the regime. On 7 February 1986, Jean-Claude fled the country and sought refuge in France.

=== Military governments ===
After Jean-Claude's overthrow, the National Council of Government (CNG) was organized under General Henri Namphy. Between 1986 and 1990, several military-dominated governments—including the CNG, the government of Leslie Manigat, a second Namphy government, and the government of Prosper Avril—controlled Haiti. At the same time, popular and religious organizations were continuing to mobilize, including Aristide's Lavalas (transl. 'Avalanche'). The Namphy government attempted to assassinate Aristide several times, including once at his church.

Aristide ran for president during the 1990–91 Haitian general election under the Front National pour le Changement de la Democratie (FNCD, transl. 'National Front for Change and Democracy'), a loose coalition of liberal parties. The United States attempted to back neoliberal economist Marc Bazin for the presidency. In addition, they sought to have Roger Lafontant, a former Tonton Macoute, return to Haiti to serve as an far-right candidate. However, on 16 December, with over 80% voter participation, Aristide won 67% of the vote to Bazin's 13%.

=== First coup attempt ===
Before he was inaugurated, Lafontant attempted a coup d'état against the incumbent provisional president Ertha Pascal-Trouillot, taking her hostage and briefly occupying the National Palace. Subsequently, large numbers of Aristide supporters filled the streets in protest. These supporters blocked airport access, erected barricades in the streets, and attacked Lafontant's headquarters, killing several of his supporters, some via Père Lebrun (a Haitian term for necklacing). They also ransacked the papal nuncio's residence and burned a historic cathedral, seemingly in response to an earlier homily delivered by François-Wolff Ligondé, the pro-Duvalier archbishop of Port-au-Prince. In response to these developments, General Hérard Abraham ordered the army to disperse the coup and arrest collaborators, but only after a twelve-hour delay and pressure from ambassadors from both the United States and Venezuela. On 27 January, rumors of another impending coup provoked further violence, culminating in a fire that killed four children at an orphanage on 3 February. In total, at least 125 people died due to street violence in the leadup to Aristide's inauguration.

=== Aristide government ===
Aristide was inaugurated on 7 February 1991. His presidency combined elements of social democracy with populism. In a 1991 speech before the United Nations, Aristide outlined his conception of democracy for Haiti, which characterized social and economic rights—such as the right to eat, to work, and to social justice—as complements to traditional political freedoms. His vision centered on serving the poor through a "Growth-with-Equity" model, with the state redistributing resources and ensuring basic needs such as clean water, healthcare, and education. Early in his presidency, Aristide opened Fort Dimanche, a prison operated by the Duvaliers, for public viewing, and invited impoverished Haitians to eat with him outside the National Palace. He also undertook a literacy campaign, decreased food prices, began enforcing import fees on foreign goods, replaced military administrators with civilian ones, and attempted to raise the minimum wage.

These measures faced intense opposition from the military, the middle class, the wealthy, and other powerful interest groups in Haitian society. Many soldiers resented Aristide's reforms. Military leadership interpreted Aristide's creation of an independent presidential security service with foreign training as a sign of distrust and an attempt to dilute their power. In United States government and media circles, Aristide was portrayed as anti-American, demagogic, and sometimes psychotic. Some criticized what they saw as Aristide's disregard for democratic institutions, including his view that "people are the law" and his appointment of ally and friend René Préval as prime minister. He also controversially referenced Père Lebrun in an August 1991 speech, advocating for its strategic use while stating it should not be employed "where law prevails". Critics viewed this as condoning murder, while supporters and some analysts interpreted his remarks as a shorthand to invoke ideas of "popular power" or "resistance by all means necessary" against potential coups and aggression from the Tonton Macoutes. Alvin P. Adams Jr, the United States ambassador to Haiti, warned Aristide of several plots to assassinate or otherwise overthrow him, some from the military and others from civilians.

== Coup d'état ==
=== Prelude ===
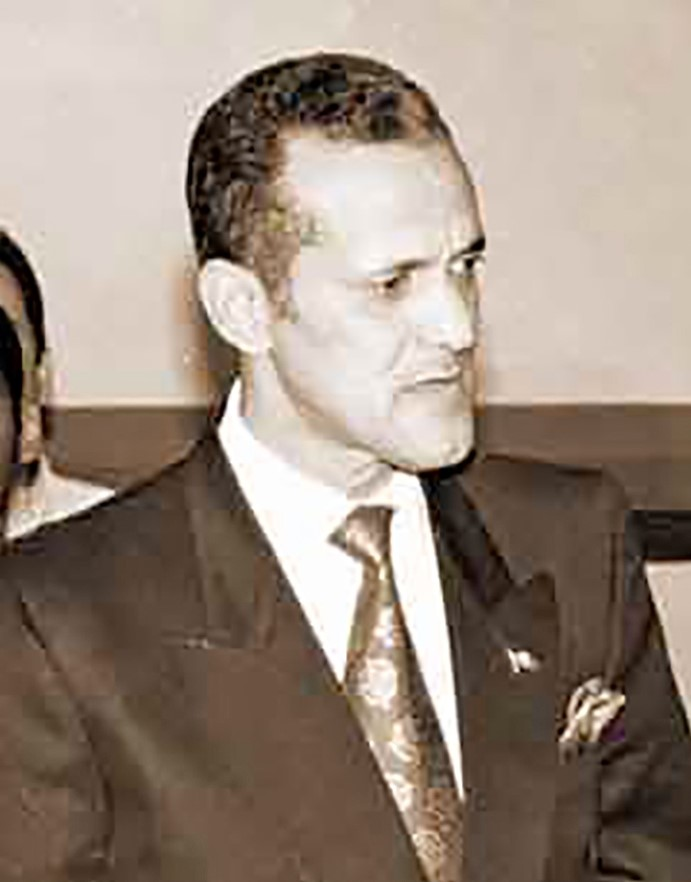
Raoul Cédras was one of the primary orchestrators of the coup

On 23 September 1991, Aristide traveled to New York City to address the United Nations, where he discussed the mistreatment of Haitian sugarcane laborers in the Dominican Republic. While he was gone, officers of the "Cafeteria" unit of the Haitian Army, which was under the command of Chief of National Police Michel François, briefed their troops on the upcoming coup on 25 September. Some rank-and-file soldiers were bribed as much as G 30,000 (US$5,000) to participate, with the money being sourced from wealthy families. François and General Raoul Cédras deployed troops to various strategic locations throughout Port-au-Prince.

Rumors about the possibility of a coup began to spread, but Aristide was skeptical. He returned to Haiti on 27 September. When he arrived, he was taken to his jeep, which proceeded slowly through cheering crowds drawn from Port-au-Prince's shanty towns. At the National Palace, he delivered a speech urging the wealthy to create jobs, warning officials against corruption, and calling for the use of an unspecified "tool" against "thie[ves]... robber[s]... swindler[s] or... embezzler[s]". Soon after giving the speech, Aristide called Cédras on the phone to discuss the rumors of an impending coup. According to Aristide, Cédras "supported [him] in [his] skepticism, and [they] laughed about it together".

=== Capture of Aristide ===
Troops began mutinying on the night of 29 September, some believing that Aristide's presidential security service was poised to imminently disarm and disband the army. That night, members of the military shut down local radio stations and opened fire at Aristide's private residence. An armored car crewed by loyalist forces transported Aristide and French Ambassador Jean-Rafael Dufour to the National Palace. They were ambushed twice en-route. Soldiers opened fire on both the crowds that formed to support Aristide and at vehicles on the street, including ambulances. They also entered various shanty towns, shooting indiscriminately at anyone they encountered and firing into people's homes. According to researcher Peter Hallward, "at least 300 people were killed that night", with the Washington Post reporting 250 deaths in Cité Soleil. Soldiers also arrested Jacques Gary Siméon, a journalist for Radio Caraïbes, and his dead body was found soon after.

Upon reaching the palace, Aristide found himself abandoned by the presidential security service, some of whom joined the soldiers in seizing the palace and capturing him. He was then taken to the headquarters of the Haitian Army, where Adams, Dufour, and the Venezuelan ambassador negotiated for his life. As a result of these negotiations, it was determined that Aristide would be exiled to Venezuela. Venezuelan President Carlos Andrés Pérez chartered him a plane, and he left from the Toussaint Louverture International Airport later that night.

=== Military takeover ===
On 30 September, protests continued in response to the coup. Both Lafonant and Sylvio Claude, a two-time presidential candidate and Aristide critic, were reported killed, with Claude being burned to death in the streets of Les Cayes, Sud. At 23:00, Cédras announced that the military had taken over:

Today, the armed forces find themselves obligated to assume the heavy responsibility to keep the ship of state afloat... After seven months... of democratic experience, the country once again finds itself a prey to the horrors of uncertainty. With all Haitians.. we will bring the ship to port. The armed forces of Haiti insist on reaffirming that it is an apolitical institution at the service of the Haitian people. It will respect constitutional order, guarantee democratic liberty and will not condone any act of pillage...

The New York Times initially reported that 26 people were killed during the coup, with 200 wounded. Later, the United States Department of State estimated that 300 to 500 people were killed during the coup. Amnesty International put the number killed at 1,500.

=== Accusations of United States involvement ===
The United States's role in the coup is disputed. Hallward claims that "neither Cédras nor his associates Michel François and [Cédras deputy] Philippe Biamby would have so much as contemplated overthrowing Aristide without United States approval and support". A United States intelligence monitor quoted by Hallward claims that the United States supplied the Haitian military with ammunition during the coup. Legal scholar Kathleen Marie Whitney claims that several people involved with the coup were paid for information by the CIA in the period from the mid-1980s until 1991. She also notes that Cédras was educated in the United States and that he was tasked by France and the United States with security during the 1990 election. Hallward describes François as a "notorious CIA asset", and journalist Allan Nairn claims that François's attaché, Marcel Morissaint, also worked with United States intelligence. Some reported seeing CIA station chief and United States military attaché Patrick Collins at the Haitian Army's headquarters during the coup. Aristide himself believed that the coup was engineered by the United States, singling out Alvin P. Adams Jr. as the key orchestrator.

Scholar and diplomat David M. Malone argues that rumors of CIA involvement in the coup are unsubstantiated and that the actions of the Bush Administration, such as freezing assets and condemning the coup, (Note: See § United States) demonstrated the United States government's opposition to it. He further argues that Collins's presence may have been "routine". Historian Philippe R. Girard characterizes the idea of United States involvement in the 1991 coup as a "conspiracy theory" lacking sufficient evidence. He further argues that Aristide and his supporters' blame of foreign powers, particularly the United States, exaggerates Haiti's importance to the United States in 1991 and ignores both Aristide's own missteps as president and the positive contributions made by the international community after the coup.

== Aftermath ==
According to Human Rights Watch, immediately following the coup, at least 300 civilians were killed by Haitian troops and "thousands more" were wounded, primarily in impoverished, pro-Aristide neighborhoods around Port-au-Prince. Meanwhile, a collaborative report produced by Americas Watch, the National Coalition of Haitian Refugees, and Physicians for Human Rights estimates that 1,000 people were killed in the two weeks following the coup, with 500 more being killed after that. Massacres occurred in Cité Soleil and Lamentin. Soldiers also undertook mass arrests in the Carrefours, Carrefours-Feuilles and Martissant neighborhoods. Within two weeks of the coup, an estimated 250,000 people fled Port-au-Prince, seeking refuge in rural areas.

Soldiers engaged in widespread destruction throughout the country, looting and destroying food storage silos owned by peasant groups and slaughtering their livestock. On 7 October, military personnel stormed the Legislative Palace, threatening to shoot legislators if they did not vote to install judge Joseph Nerette as provisional president. That same day, soldiers assaulted Evans Paul, the mayor of Port-au-Prince. Nerette was sworn in two days later on 9 October, and the Assembly ratified the appointment of Jean-Jacques Honorat as prime minister on 14 October.

On 12 November, 100 to 150 students attending a press conference backing a call by the Organization of American States (OAS) for Aristide's reinstatement and an embargo against the military regime (Note: See § International organizations) were arrested. Soldiers abducted Felix Lamy, the director of Radio Galaxie, on 10 December, leading to the closure of the last three independent news stations in the country. Five days later, on 15 December, military authorities killed socialist politician and pro-Aristide deputy Astrel Charles after a dispute regarding a public meeting in his district.

In the three years following the coup, the military regime targeted community and religious organizations, as well as labor and peasant activists, killing between 4,000 and 5,000 Lavalas supporters. Roughly 300,000 people were internally displaced. Driven by political repression, economic hardship resulting from international embargoes on the regime, and misinformation exaggerating the likelihood of being granted asylum, tens of thousands (Note: 53,000 per Levy and 60,000 per Hallward.) of Haitians risked their lives fleeing to the United States on makeshift boats. Some also fled to the Dominican Republic.

The economic situation post-coup influenced the unsafe practices within Haiti's maritime transport industry which caused the 1993 sinking of the ferry Neptune near Miragoane, which may be one of the deadliest maritime disasters in history at an estimated 1,500 resulting deaths.

=== International reactions ===
==== International organizations ====
Upon his arrival in Caracas, a dejected Aristide was persuaded by Pérez to fight for the restoration of his presidency by mobilizing international support through organizations like the OAS and the UN. On 30 September, the OAS called a meeting in response to the coup, demanding Aristide's return to power based on the Santiago Resolution, which guaranteed that the OAS would meet to address any sudden disruption to a member state's democratic government. At the meeting, the OAS declared its opposition to the military regime and advocated for a hemisphere-wide embargo against it. Meanwhile, the United Nations Security Council (UNSC), despite initial opposition from a group of members led by China and India who deemed it an internal matter, eventually expressed support for Aristide and condemned the coup.

The embargo on Haiti severely damaged its economy. International bodies, including the OAS, UN, and various financial institutions, devised a multi-million-dollar plan for Haiti's economic recovery and humanitarian aid, hoping to incentivize the elite to restore constitutional order. However, on June 6, 1993, the OAS advocated for stronger sanctions on Haiti, leading to a UNSC resolution for mandatory embargoes on weapons and petroleum. Later, on 3 July 1993, Aristide, under considerable pressure from UN special envoy Dante Caputo, signed the Governors Island Agreement, which established a ten-point framework for restoring constitutional order in Haiti, including amnesty for the coup leaders, a prime minister to be nominated by Aristide, and Aristide's return by 30 October 1993. On July 24, 1993, Aristide nominated Robert Malval for prime minister, and on 27 August, the UNSC suspended sanctions against Haiti.

The UNSC approved the UN Mission in Haiti (UNMIH) on 31 August 1993, to assess requirements for Aristide's return. However, the arrival of the USS Harlan County on 11 October as part of the UNMIH was met with organized resistance from the Front for the Advancement and Progress of Haïti (FRAPH), a paramilitary group that supported the military junta, leading to its withdrawal. As a result, the embargo was reimposed on 13 October. On 31 July 1994, the UNSC adopted Resolution 940, authorizing a multinational force to use "all necessary means" to remove Haiti's military leadership and restore Aristide.

==== United States ====
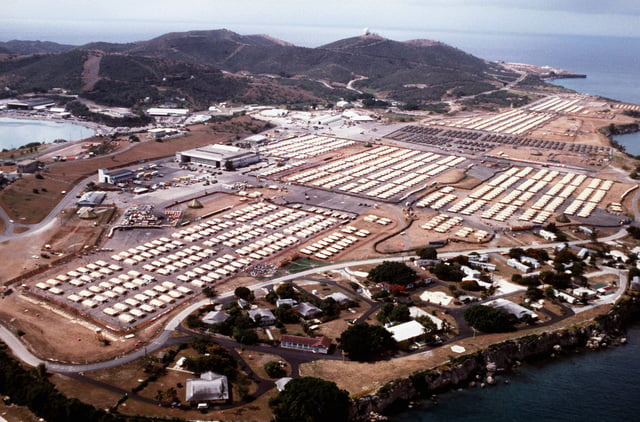
An airfield at Guantanamo Bay converted into a tent camp for Haitian refugees

Protests against the coup were held in Miami, Florida, where riot police deployed tear gas against demonstrators, and in New York City, where Haitian residents gathered at the UN headquarters to demand intervention. Soon after the coup, James Baker, the United States Secretary of State under George H. W. Bush, condemned the Cédras junta, vowing that it "[would] not succeed". As a result of the coup, the United States government suspended a large portion of the $85.5 million aid package allotted to Haiti in 1991, which included economic, food, and nonlethal military aid, along with a pending $90.8 million aid request for 1992. All Haitian government holdings in the United States were also frozen. Citing Aristide's reliance on "mob rule", a spokesman for the Bush administration claimed that the end of the military regime might not entail his return. However, the United States quickly reaffirmed its pro-Aristide stance, with the State Department asserting that "problems in the human rights situation can't be resolved by overthrowing a democratically elected government". After this, in accordance with the OAS resolution, the Bush administration imposed a total embargo against Haiti and ordered nonessential United States personnel to leave, resulting in significant import and export losses for Haiti.

The United States Coast Guard intercepted many Haitian refugees attempting to reach the United States, and the Bush administration sent most back to Haiti, labeling them economic migrants rather than political refugees. C. Clyde Atkins, a United States federal judge, temporarily issued an injunction against this practice due to the risk of political persecution in Haiti. However, the Bush administration successfully argued in a federal appeals court that the ban on refoulement did not apply to those interdicted before reaching United States territory, allowing repatriations to resume. While contesting the injunction, the Bush administration held over 7,400 Haitian refugees at the Guantanamo Bay Naval Base, denying them access to legal resources. Of these refugees, 1,012 were ultimately determined to have plausible grounds for claiming asylum. Human Rights Watch argues that the Bush administration's focus on stopping Haitian refugees from reaching the United States diminished its willingness to advocate for human rights in Haiti, noting that public criticism of the human rights abuses committed by the regime declined around the same time that the United States was arguing that Haitian refugees were not experiencing political persecution.

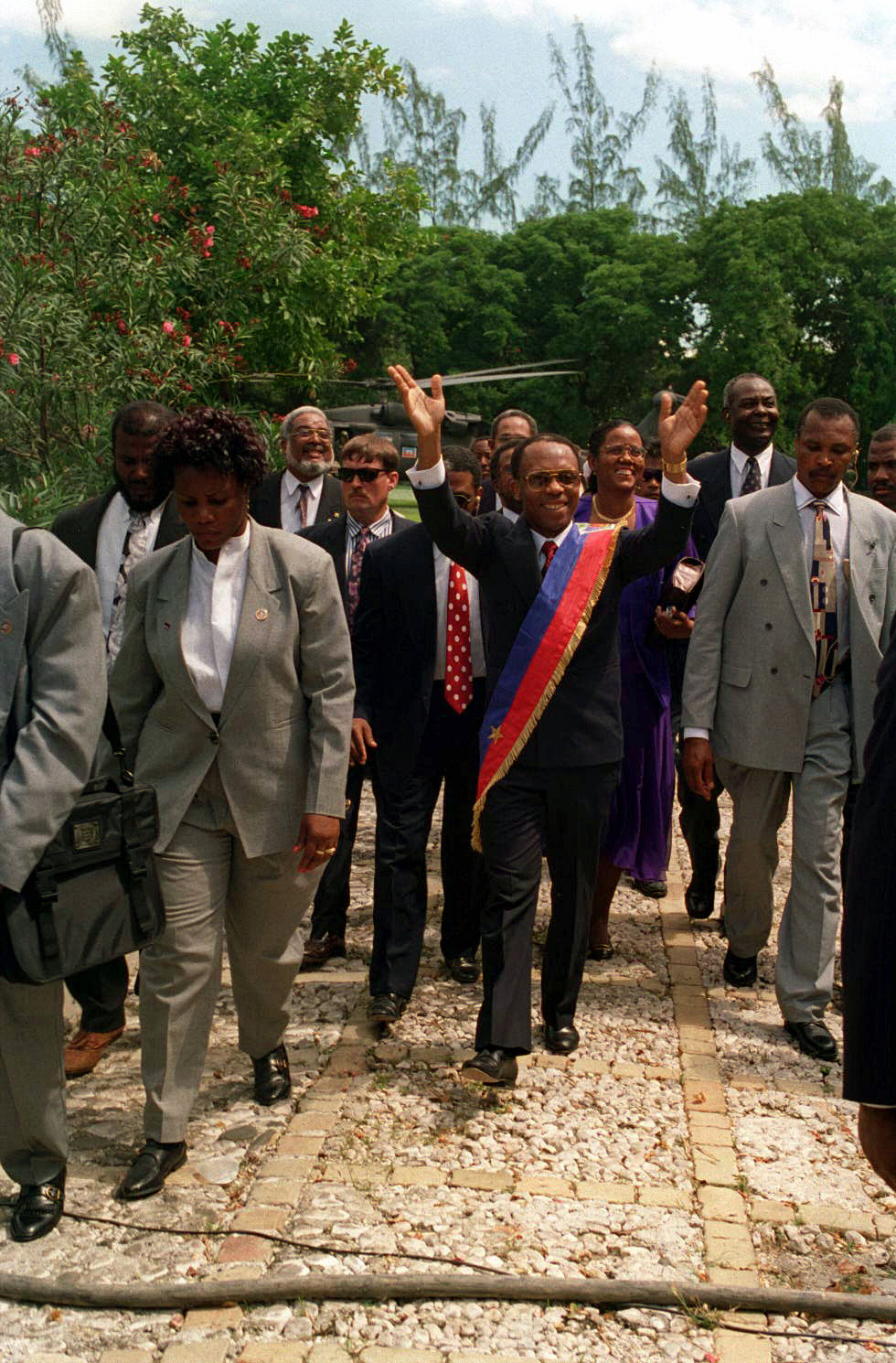
Aristide returning to the National Palace in the aftermath of Operation Uphold Democracy

Bill Clinton became president of the United States in 1993, and while he supported the reinstatement of Aristide's government, many in the national security establishment, including the CIA, opposed it. The CIA reportedly led efforts to prevent Aristide's return to Haiti and fostered the creation of the FRAPH. The FRAPH suppressed Lavalas supporters using various methods, including murder, disappearance, rape, and torture. The United States supplied the FRAPH with weapons in violation of the embargo. It also paid Emmanuel Constant, the head of the FRAPH, for information about the organization until 1994, when it was determined that he was not a reliable source. Constant openly rejected an agreement broker by the United Statesfor Aristide's return and organized the demonstration that blocked the USS Harlan County.

On 15 September 1994, Clinton threatened imminent military action against the military government. However, on 16 September, former President Jimmy Carter, General Colin Powell, and Senator Sam Nunn negotiated a controversial agreement for the Haitian military leadership's peaceful departure. These negotiations were ignored by United States officials and criticized by the UN due to its exclusion from the negotiating process. Later that month, in accordance with UNSC Resolution 940, the United States led a coalition of 19 countries in Operation Uphold Democracy, which successfully removed the junta and reinstated Aristide.

==== Caribbean nations ====
The refugee crisis that emerged in the aftermath of the coup intensified long-standing tensions in the Caribbean. Many nations in the region already contained large populations of impoverished Haitian laborers, many of whom lacked legal protections, were cut off from essential services, and were at high risk of exploitation. The Dominican Republic, which tacitly supported the military regime, responded to the post-coup refugee crisis with increased border enforcement, restrictive asylum policies, and mass deportations, perpetuating a historical pattern of aggressive repatriations. Other Caribbean nations and territories, including The Bahamas, Jamaica, and Turks and Caicos, engaged in similar, often arbitrary mass repatriation efforts targeting Haitian residents, frequently failing to uphold agreements for legal review or residency.

== Sources ==
- Americas Watch; et al. (1991). Return to the Darkest Days: Human Rights in Haiti since the Coup (Report).
- Appiah, Kwame Anthony; Gates, Henry Louis Jr., eds. (1999). "Haiti". Africana: The Encyclopedia of the African and African American Experience. New York: Basic Books. pp. 904–909. ISBN 0-465-00071-1.
- "Appointment ratified". Corvallis Gazette-Times. 15 October 1991 – via Newspapers.com.
- Collins Jr., Edward; Cole, Timothy M. (1996). "Regime Legitimation in Instances of Coup-Caused Governments-in-Exile: The Cases of Presidents Makarios and Aristide". Journal of International Law and Practice. 5 (2): 199–288.
- Congressional Research Service (1993). "Haiti: Background to the 1991 Overthrow of President Aristide". EveryCRSReport.com.
- Constable, Pamela (1992). "Dateline Haiti: Caribbean Stalemate". Foreign Policy (89): 175–190. doi:10.2307/1149080. JSTOR 1149080.
- Danner, Mark (1993). "The Fall of the Prophet". The New York Review of Books.
- Dupuy, Alex (2007). The Prophet and Power: Jean-Bertrand Aristide, the International Community, and Haiti. Lanham: Rowman & Littlefield Publishers. ISBN 978-0-7425-3830-6.
- Eaton, William J. (1991). "Judge Sworn In as Haiti's Interim President; U.S. Rejects New Regime: Inauguration: Joseph Nerette vows to promote national reconciliation during his tenure". Los Angeles Times.
- French, Howard W. (1991). "Haiti Police Seen as Gaining in Coup". The New York Times.
- French, Howard W. (1991). "U.S. Will Impose a Trade Ban on Haiti". The New York Times.
- Gavigan, Patrick (1995). "Migration Emergencies and Human Rights in Haiti". Organization of American States.
- Girard, Philippe R. (2005). Paradise Lost: Haiti's Tumultuous Journey from Pearl of the Caribbean to Third World Hotspot. New York: Palgrave Macmillan. doi:10.1057/9781403980311. ISBN 978-1-4039-8031-1.
- Gray, Jerry (1991). "Haitian's Visit to New York Is a Celebration". The New York Times.
- "Haiti's Military Assumes Power After Troops Arrest the President". The New York Times. 1991.
- Hallward, Peter (2007). Damming the Flood: Haiti and the Politics of Containment. London; New York: Verso. ISBN 978-1-84467-466-4.
- Herard, Dimmy (2016). The Politics of Democratization: Jean-Bertrand Aristide and the Lavalas Movement in Haiti (Doctoral thesis). Westchester: Florida International University.
- Human Rights Watch (1992). "Human Rights Watch World Report 1992". Refworld.
- Jean-Francois, Roosevelt (1991). "Haitian journalist found dead". UPI.
- Khol, Barbara (1991). Military Coup In Haiti: Summary Of Developments. NotiSur (Report). Albuquerque: University of New Mexico. ISSN 1060-4189.
- Kim, Allen (2016). "Aristide, Jean-Bertrand". In Knight, Franklin W.; Gates, Henry Louis Jr. (eds.). Dictionary of Caribbean and Afro–Latin American Biography. Oxford University Press.
- Kim, Allen (2016). "Duvalier, François". In Knight, Franklin W.; Gates, Henry Louis Jr. (eds.). Dictionary of Caribbean and Afro–Latin American Biography. Oxford University Press.
- Kim, Allen (2016). "Duvalier, Jean-Claude". In Knight, Franklin W.; Gates, Henry Louis Jr. (eds.). Dictionary of Caribbean and Afro–Latin American Biography. Oxford University Press.
- Levy, Mike (2009). "Haiti". In Forsythe, David P. (ed.). Encyclopedia of Human Rights. Oxford University Press.
- Malone, David (1998). Decision-Making in the UN Security Council: The Case of Haiti, 1990-1997. Oxford University Press. doi:10.1093/acprof:oso/9780198294832.001.0001. ISBN 978-0-19-829483-2.
- Nairn, Allan (1995). "Our payroll, Haitian hit". The Nation – via The Free Library.
- Plummer, Brenda Gayle (1992). Haiti and the United States: The Psychological Moment. Athens: University of Georgia Press. ISBN 0-8203-1422-6.
- Podur, Justin (2012). Haiti's New Dictatorship: The Coup, the Earthquake and the UN Occupation. London; Toronto; New York: Pluto Press. ISBN 978-0-7453-3257-4.
- Immigration and Refugee Board of Canada (1992). "Impact of the September 1991 Coup". Refworld. United Nations High Commissioner for Refugees.
- Romero, Simon (2010). "Carlos Andrés Pérez, 88, former Venezuela President". The New York Times.
- Torgman, Annabelle L. (2012). "Haiti: A Failed State? Democratic Process and OAS Intervention". The University of Miami Inter-American Law Review. 44 (1): 113–137. JSTOR 23645503.
- Whitney, Kathleen Marie (1996). "Sin, Fraph, and the CIA: U.S. Covert Action in Haiti". Southwestern Journal of Law and Trade in the Americas. 3 (2): 303–332.
