= Haitian coup d'état =

Haitian coup d'état may refer to:

- 2004 Haitian coup d'état
- 2001 Haitian coup attempt
- 1991 Haitian coup d'état
- 1989 Haitian coup d'état attempt
- June 1988 Haitian coup d'état
- September 1988 Haitian coup d'état
- 1970 Haitian coup attempt
- July 1958 Haitian coup d'état attempt
- 1950 Haitian coup d'état
