= Jean-Claude Paul =

Lt. Col. Jean-Claude Paul (1938–39 – 7 November 1988) was a Haitian military officer alleged to have been involved in the illegal drug trade in Haiti. He was indicted by a Miami court on 10 March 1988 for allegedly trafficking cocaine.

Paul's battalion was responsible for security in Port-au-Prince. The New York Times wrote that "Witnesses say it was his troops who opened fired several times on street protesters during the summer of 1987, killing more than 30 people. To what extent his troops took part in the killing that halted elections in Haiti last fall is unclear. But his soldiers did not provide protection then or during an attack on a Roman Catholic church in Port-au-Prince this month."

Paul was commander of the Dessalines barracks until 14 June 1988, when he was transferred by Henri Namphy (as part of a number of military reassignments by Namphy) to army headquarters and made Assistant Head of the General Staff. Paul telephoned President Leslie Manigat to protest the move, and the following day Manigat issued a statement cancelling the changes, and saying that he, as constitutional head of the army, had not been consulted. On 19 June Manigat retired Namphy, saying he had been preparing a coup. On 20 June Namphy ousted Manigat in the June 1988 Haitian coup d'état, declaring himself President with Col. Jean-Claude Paul at his side. Paul was found dead in his home in suburban La Boule, Haiti on 7 November 1988. He was 49 years old and is believed to have been poisoned.
