= Gérard Gourgue =

Haitian politician and activist (1925–2020)

Member of the Haitian National Council of Government
- In office 7 February 1986 – 20 March 1986

Minister of Justice
- In office 7 February 1986 – 20 March 1986
- Preceded by: Jean Vandal
- Succeeded by: François Latortue

Personal details
- Born: 1 December 1925 Port-au-Prince, Haiti
- Died: 4 December 2020 (aged 95) Port-au-Prince, Haiti
- Party: Fanmi Lavalas

Gérard Gourgue (French pronunciation: [ʒeʁaʁ ɡuʁɡ]; 1 December 1925 – 4 December 2020) was a Haitian politician and human rights activist. He ran for President in 1988.

== Biography ==
Gourgue completed his secondary studies at the Lycée Alexandre Pétion in Port-au-Prince. He continued his university studies in Haiti and in France. He started his career as a lawyer, participating in the Bar of Port-au-Prince. Faced with Tonton Macoute militants, he created the Ligue haïtienne des droits humains. He led the organization until 1986.

On 7 February 1986, after the fall of the regime of Jean-Claude Duvalier, Gourgue was called to the National Council of Government by Henri Namphy. However, he resigned after 41 days due to divisive disagreements with the ruling regime. In 1988, he ran for president under the Fanmi Lavalas label. However, the United States intervened allowing Namphy to continue his rule. After the 2000 Haitian parliamentary election, Gourgue served as honorary president until Jean-Bertrand Aristide was sworn in, in February 2001. In 2004, Gourgue was appointed as ambassador of Haiti to UNESCO and personal representative of Provisional President Boniface Alexandre. He also represented Haiti at the Organisation internationale de la Francophonie.

On 11 June 2009, Gourgue participated in the Haitian book festival Livres en Folie at the Parc Historique de la Canne à Sucre. Following the 2010 Haiti earthquake, he was involved in the Plan stratégique de sauvetage national.

Gérard Gourgue died in Port-au-Prince on 4 December 2020 at the age of 95.
