= Philippe Biamby =

Haitian military and politician

Philippe Biamby (September 21, 1952 – December 13, 2008) was a member of the Haitian Armed Forces High Command, Chief of Staff of the Haitian Army and deputy of Raoul Cédras during the Haitian junta of 1991 to 1994.

== Early years ==
Philippe Biamby is a son of Ketly Biamby and Pierre Biamby, an important official of the Duvalier Era.

He received infantry training at Fort Benning, Georgia, between 1980 and 1985.

Biamby in 1989 was expelled from the army after participating in a coup attempt against Prosper Avril. After the coup failed, he fled to the Dominican Republic and later traveled to the United States, where was he arrested for immigration charges.

== Haitian Junta ==
Biamby as Army Chief of Staff, helped topple Jean-Bertrand Aristide during 1991 Coup.

During military junta, was member of Haitian Armed Forces High Command and right-hand man of Raoul Cédras. He was described as a hard-line anti-American.

== Later life ==
With the arrival of American forces in Haiti in September 1994, Biamby fled to Panama, where he was granted political asylum. A 1998 extradition request from Haiti was not granted.

Philippe Biamby was indicted in 2000 for his connection to the Raboteau massacre and sentenced in absentia by a Haitian court on November 16, 2000, to life imprisonment.

He died on December 13, 2008, because of cancer
