= Joseph Nérette =

Haitian jurist (1924–2007)

- Official portrait, 1991

Provisional President of Haiti
- In office October 8, 1991 – June 19, 1992
- Prime Minister: Jean-Jacques Honorat
- Preceded by: Raoul Cédras (de facto)
- Succeeded by: Marc Bazin (acting)

Judge of the Supreme Court of Haiti
- In office 1988–1991
- Appointed by: Henri Namphy

Personal details
- Born: April 9, 1924 Port-au-Prince, Haiti
- Died: April 29, 2007 (aged 83) Port-au-Prince, Haiti
- Party: Independent
- Spouse: Guerda Jean-Baptiste
- Profession: Jurist

Joseph Nérette (French pronunciation: [ʒozɛf neʁɛt]; April 9, 1924 – April 29, 2007) was a Haitian jurist and Supreme Court judge who served as the provisional president of Haiti from 1991 to 1992, part of a period in which real political authority rested with the military junta headed by Raoul Cédras and Michel François.

== Early life and career ==
Joseph Nérette was born on April 9, 1924, in Port-au-Prince. He got his law degree in 1950 in Port-au-Prince. Nérette served as substitute prosecutor in Port-au-Prince from 1971 to 1978. He was an appeals court judge from 1978 until 1988, when he was appointed to the Supreme Court of Haiti by a military government. In addition to French and Haitian Creole, he also spoke Spanish. By the time of the 1991 Haitian coup d'état, he was the third-ranking justice on the 12-member Supreme Court.

== Provisional presidency ==
After the overthrow of President Jean-Bertrand Aristide in a military coup, the military junta appointed Nérette as provisional president of Haiti, in accordance with the rules of succession in the Haitian constitution. Less than half of the members of parliament were present when the presidency was declared vacant, and it was done under pressure from the military. Nérette said at his inauguration on October 8, 1991, that he is not a politician and never has been. He also said that he would respect the constitution, and called for a national reconciliation. Nérette had the power to appoint an interim government until elections were held. He was not recognized by the United States, Canada, the Organization of American States, and some Haitian embassies abroad, which saw him as a figurehead for an illegitimate government.

Although the constitution required a new president to be elected after three months, the Haitian parliament granted an extension in January 1992 for the provisional president to remain in office. On June 2, 1992, Nerette nominated Marc Bazin to serve as prime minister of Haiti and replace the provisional government, after negotiations involving Nerette and the leaders of the Senate and the Chamber of Deputies towards resolving the crisis that began with the military coup. Bazin was confirmed in a Senate vote on June 10.

He died of lung cancer in Port-au-Prince on April 29, 2007, aged 83.
