= September 1988 Haitian coup d'état =

Military overthrow of Henri Namphy

| Date | 18 September 1988 |
| Location | Haiti |
| Status | Henri Namphy overthrown |

Belligerents
| (Haiti) Haitian Presidential Guard | (Haiti) Haitian government |

Commanders and leaders
| (Haiti) Prosper Avril | (Haiti) Henri Namphy |

The September 1988 Haitian coup d'état took place on 18 September 1988, when a group of non-commissioned officers in the Haitian Presidential Guard overthrew General Henri Namphy and brought General Prosper Avril to power. Namphy had been a member of the National Council of Government from 1986 until the February 1988 inauguration of Leslie Manigat, who had won the military-controlled 1988 general election. Namphy had overthrown Manigat in the June 1988 coup d'état when Manigat sought to exercise his constitutional right to control military assignments.

The St. Jean Bosco massacre on 11 September, attributed to former Tonton Macoute, contributed to the September coup, particularly after Namphy failed to condemn it and six participants were allowed to appear on national television the following day and issue further threats. As the IACHR put it, "Many people were outraged that these individuals could appear on television, without any disguise, confess their participation in these events and threaten future criminal acts with no fear of being arrested by the authorities." In addition, there were fears that the massacre could be the beginning of the re-emergence of the Tonton Macoute and potentially eclipse the army.

"In a brief prepared statement read in the name of the Presidential Guard at 2 a.m. Sunday morning, Sgt. Joseph Heubreux explained the coup as an attempt by non-commissioned officers to restore honor to the Armed Forces of Haiti and to end a period of random violence and confusion in the army chain of command under General Namphy. Sgt. Heubreux introduced the new head of state, Prosper Avril, as "the most honest officer" in the Haitian Armed forces. Lt. Gen. Prosper Avril stated that he accepted the nomination as President to "save the country from anarchy and chaos".

Avril had been removed from the National Council of Government in 1986 following demonstrations protesting his links to the previous regime of Jean-Claude Duvalier. The September coup brought him to the Presidency, and he remained there as head of a military regime until March 1990.
