= Yves Volel =

Haitian lawyer

Yves Volel (1934–1987) was a Haitian lawyer, activist, and presidential candidate. He was assassinated in 1987 while running for office. He was the leader of an offshoot of the Haitian Christian Democratic Party, led by Sylvio Claude, known as the Christian Democratic Rally.

== Early life ==
Yves Volel was born in 1934. He graduated from the Military Academy in 1954, and was classmates with Henri Namphy. He served in the Haitian military as an officer.

He was married three times, and his last wife was Rose Marie Volel. He fathered six children.

== Exile from Haiti ==
In 1965, fleeing the Francois Duvalier regime, Volel emigrated to the United States.

Volel spent 18 years working as a math teacher at the Dalton School, a prestigious private college prep school in Manhattan, New York. One of his students was Anderson Cooper, who has spoken about his teacher for CNN.

While in New York, he set up a refugee help group known as Operation Exodus.

== Return and politics ==
In 1986, after Duvalier fled to France and Namphy had become president, Volel returned to Haiti.

Volel was the attorney who prosecuted Luc Desir, Duvalier's former chief of police. He also defended Auguste Mesyeux, who was affiliated with the CATH trade union. After finance minister Leslie Delatour fired him, in January 1987, Volel sued him and won a symbolic victory for $1 in damages.

Volel became a critic of the Namphy government. Volel was a supporter of major strikes that shut down Haitian cities in 1987.

Volel became a candidate for the 1987 general election to replace Namphy, amidst rising violence. Thirty candidates declared for the election, including many former Duvalier officials. Volel suggested Duvalier officials should have a 10-year moratorium on running for office.

== Assassination ==
On August 2, 1987, Louis Eugene Athis, a candidate for the Social Democratic Party, was killed outside a church in Léogâne by a mob yelling "Kill the communists!"

On October 13, 1987, Volel told reporters he would be giving a speech demanding release of his client Jean Raymond Louis, a political prisoner held without charges, in front of the Port-au-Prince police headquarters and prison. During his speech, he was shot to death by plainclothes policemen. The police declined to comment at the scene. The next day the police released a statement saying Volel had been armed and attempting to force his way into the station, though witnesses disputed their description.

His death was mourned by Haitian author Pierre Metellus. In his honor, Haitian lawyers in Port-au-Prince held a strike as part of "a week of mourning".
