= Captain (naval) =

Naval military rank

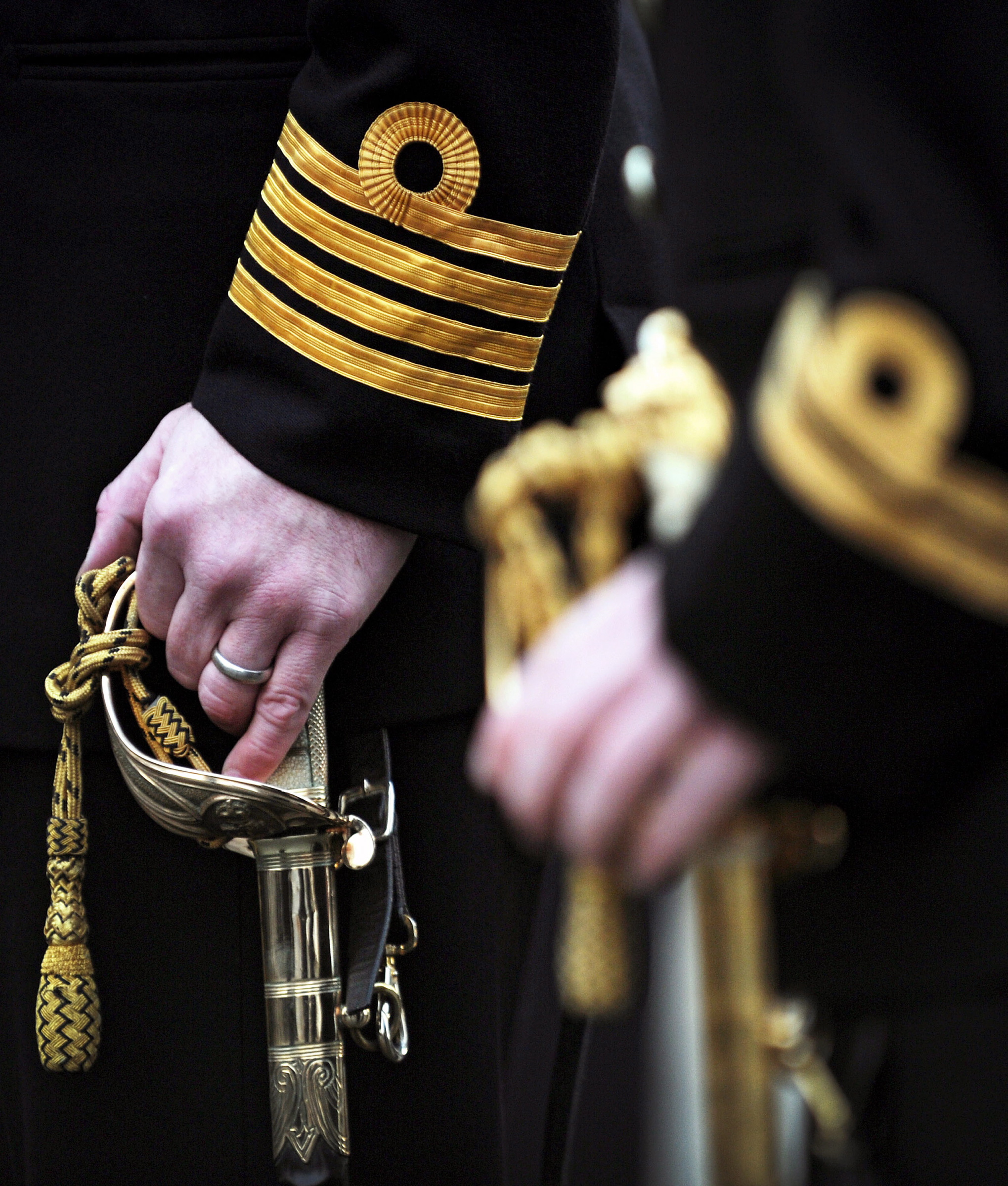
Royal Navy captain's rank insignia during Divisions conducted at HMNB Clyde, 2013

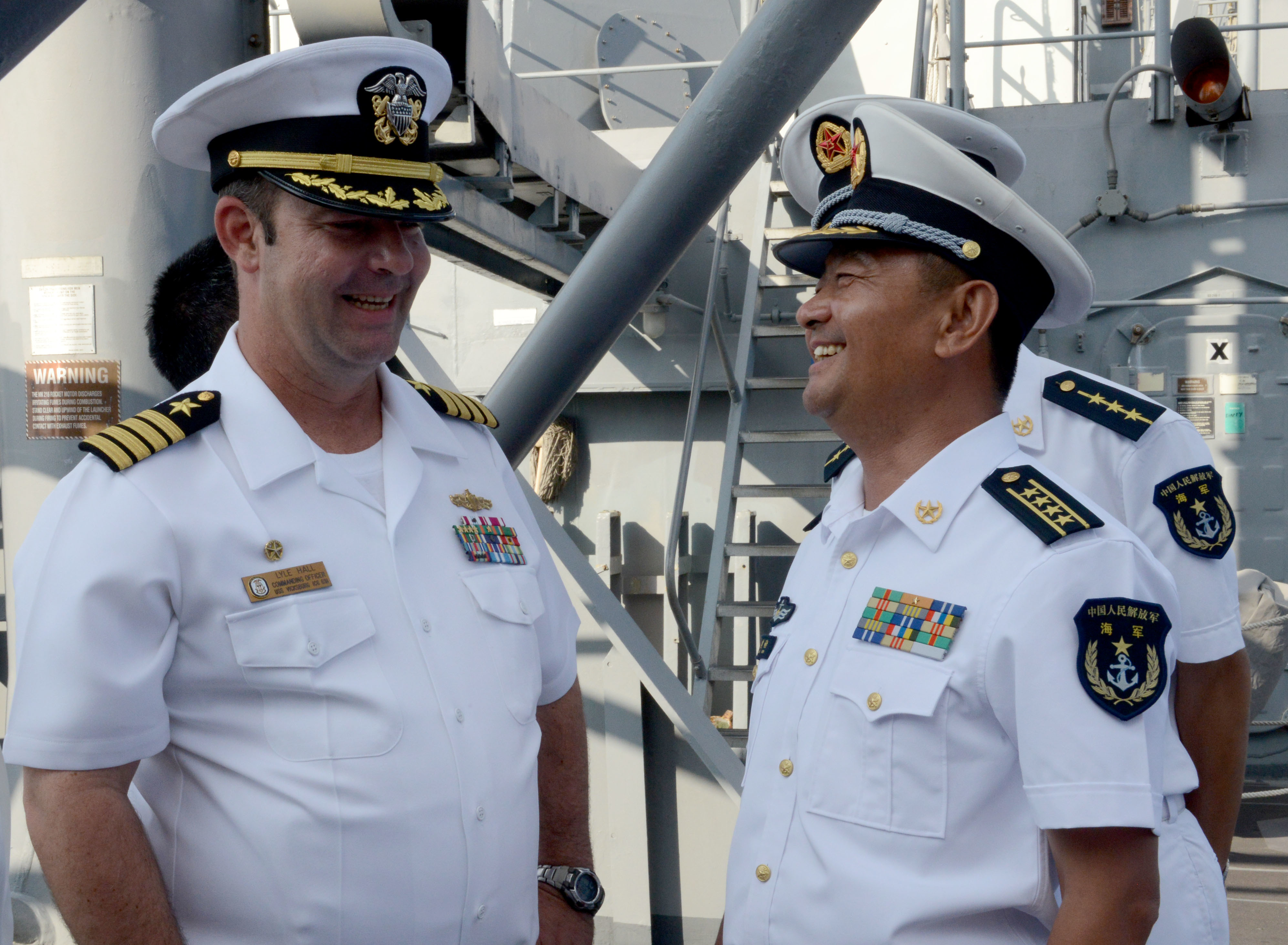
Captain from US Navy (at left) and Senior Captain from PLA Navy, 2015

Captain is the name most often given in English-speaking navies to the rank corresponding to command of the largest ships. The rank is equal to the army rank of colonel and air force rank of group captain.

Equivalent ranks worldwide include ship-of-the-line captain (e.g. France, Argentina, Spain), captain of sea and war (e.g. Brazil, Portugal), captain at sea (e.g. Germany, Netherlands) and "captain of the first rank" (Russia).

== Etiquette ==
Any naval officer who commands a ship is addressed by naval custom as "captain" while aboard in command, regardless of their actual rank, even though technically an officer of below the rank of captain is more correctly titled the commanding officer, or C.O. Officers with the rank of captain travelling aboard a vessel they do not command should be addressed by their rank and name (e.g., "Captain Smith"), but they should not be referred to as "the captain" to avoid confusion with the vessel's captain. The naval rank should not be confused with the army, air force, or marine ranks of captain, which all have the NATO code of OF-2. (Note: The Polish Navy is, however, a notable exception with "naval captain" (Polish - kapitan marynarki) in the OF-2 rank of lieutenant or captain lieutenant and the OF-5 rank being a "Commodore" (Polish - komandor).)

== Commands ==
Captains with sea commands generally command ships of cruiser size or larger; the more senior the officer, the larger the ship, but ship commanders do not normally hold a higher rank than captain. In the Royal Navy, a captain might command an aircraft carrier, an amphibious assault ship, or the Ice Patrol Ship, while naval aviator and naval flight officer captains in the U.S. Navy command aircraft carriers, large-deck amphibious assault ships, carrier air wings, maritime patrol air wings, and functional and specialized air wings and air groups.

Maritime battle staff commanders of one-star rank (commodores or rear admirals lower half) will normally embark on large capital ships such as aircraft carriers, which will function as the flagship for their strike group or battle group, but a captain will retain command of the actual ship, and assume the title of "flag captain". Even when a senior officer who is in the ship's captain's chain of command is present, all orders are given through the captain.

== By country ==
=== Argentina ===
In the Argentine Navy the rank of capitán de navío is the equivalent to colonel in the Army. However, both ranks (and Air Force´s commodore) are considered part of the flag officers group, together with generals and admirals. Its insignia is made up of four stripes.

=== Belgium ===
In the Belgian Navy the rank of capitaine de vaisseau or kapitein-ter-zee is the third grade of superior officer, equivalent to colonel in the land forces. Its insignia is made up of four bands. He or she commands a capital ship (cruiser, battleship or aircraft carrier) or a shore establishment. Smaller vessels such as destroyers and frigates are commanded by a kapitein-luitenant.

=== Canada ===
In the Royal Canadian Navy, Captain(N) (abbreviated Capt(N); capitaine de vaisseau, abbreviated capv) is a senior officer rank, equal to an army or air force colonel. A captain(N) is senior to a commander, and junior to a commodore.

Typical appointments for captains(N) include:

- Commanding officer of a Canadian Forces base;
- Commanding officer of a large school or research establishment, such as the Canadian Forces Maritime Warfare Centre;
- Commanding officer of a Protecteur-class auxiliary vessel;
- Chief of staff of a formation staff;
- Foreign military attaché.

The rank insignia for a captain(N) is four 1/2-inch (1.3 cm) stripes, worn on the cuffs of the service dress jacket, and on slip-ons on other uniforms. On the visor of the service cap is one row of gold oak leaves along the edge. Captains(N) wear the officers' pattern branch cap badge.

The "(N)" is a part of the rank descriptor, and is used in official publications and documents to distinguish a captain(N) from a captain in the army or air force. It is also important to distinguish between the rank of captain(N) and the appointment of captain, meaning the commanding officer of a ship, regardless of his or her rank.

Captains(N) are addressed initially as "Captain" followed by their surname (example: "Captain Bloggins"), thereafter by superiors and peers as "Captain" and by subordinates as "Sir" or "Ma'am". The "(N)" is not part of the spoken address.

Prior to the unification of the Canadian Forces in 1968, rank structure and insignia followed the British pattern.

=== United States ===
In the United States, the O-6 rank of captain exists in four of the uniformed services of the United States: the United States Navy, United States Coast Guard, United States Public Health Service Commissioned Corps, and National Oceanic and Atmospheric Administration Commissioned Officer Corps.

=== Gallery ===
Captain
(Antigua and Barbuda Coast Guard)

Captain
(Royal Australian Navy)

Captain
(Royal Bahamas Defence Force)

Captain
(Bangladesh Navy)

Captain
(Belize Coast Guard)

Kepten
(Royal Brunei Navy)

Captain(N)
(Royal Canadian Navy)

Mereväekapten
(Estonian Navy)

Captain
(Republic of Fiji Navy)

Captain
(Gambian Navy)

Captain
(Ghana Navy)

Captain
(Guyana Coast Guard)

Captain
कैप्टन
(Indian Navy)

Captain
Captaen
(Irish Naval Service)

Captain
(Jamaican Coast Guard)

Captain
(Liberian National Coast Guard)

Kepten
(Royal Malaysian Navy)

Captain
(Namibian Navy)

Captain
(Royal New Zealand Navy)

Captain
(Nigerian Navy)

Captain
(Urdu: کپتان, romanized: Kaptaan)
(Pakistan Navy)

Captain
(Papua New Guinea Maritime Element)

Captain
(Philippine Navy)

Căpitan
(Romanian Naval Forces)

Captain
(Sierra Leone Navy)

Kapitan
(Slovenian Navy)

Captain
(South African Navy)

Captain
(Sri Lanka Navy)

Kapten
(Swedish Navy)

Captain
(Tanzania Naval Command)

Captain
(Tongan Maritime Force)

Captain
(Trinidad and Tobago Coast Guard)

Captain
(Royal Navy)

Captain
(United States Navy)

Captain
(United States Coast Guard)

== Variants ==
=== Captain at sea ===
Captain at sea is a naval rank corresponding to command of a ship-of-the-line or capital ship.

==== Germany ====
Kapitän zur See (German: [kapiˈtɛːn t͡suːɐ̯ ˈzeː], abbreviated KptzS, KZS, or KzS) is a senior officer rank in the German Navy.

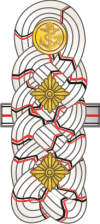
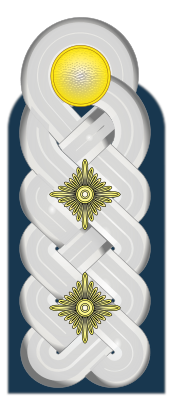
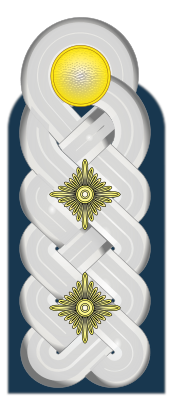
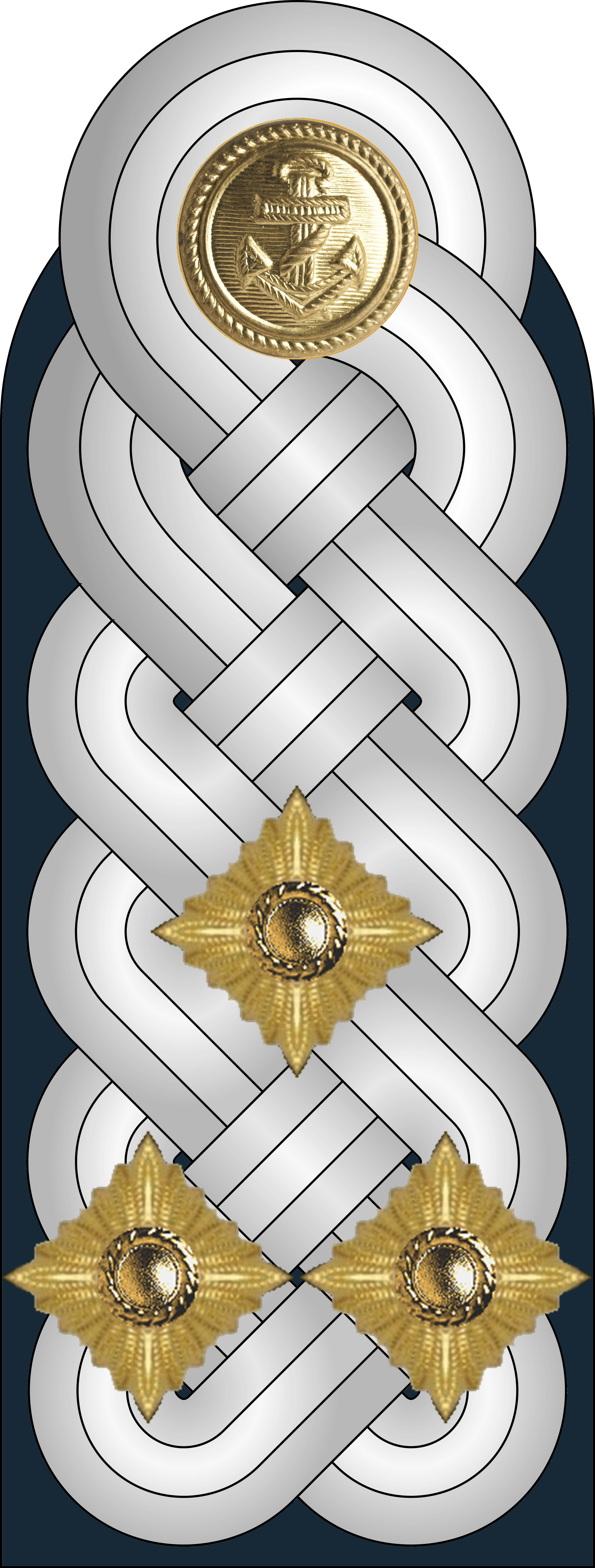
Insignia	Shoulder	Sleeve	Higher/lower rank
Imperial German Navy			Kommodore Fregattenkapitän
Reichsmarine			Kommodore Fregattenkapitän
Kriegsmarine			Kommodore Fregattenkapitän
Volksmarine			Konteradmiral Fregattenkapitän
German Navy			Flottillenadmiral Fregattenkapitän

==== Netherlands ====
In the Royal Netherlands Navy, the rank of kapitein-ter-zee is the third grade of superior officer, equivalent to colonel in the land-forces. His insignia is made up of four bands and he commands a capital ship or a shore establishment (until recently, a kapitein-ter-zee commanded the Onderzeedienst and Mijnendienst, the Netherlands Navy's submarine and mine-laying training establishments).

Smaller vessels such as destroyers and frigates are commanded by a kapitein-luitenant ter zee. Until recently flagships such as Tromp-class frigates were also commanded by a kapitein-ter-zee. Currently, De Zeven Provinciën-class frigates are commanded by a kapitein-luitenant-ter-zee.

==== Gallery ====
Kapitein-ter-zee
(German: Kapitän zur See)
(Belgian Navy)

Capitão de mar
(Cape Verdean Coast Guard)

Kapitän zur See
(German Navy)

Jūras kapteinis
(Latvian Naval Forces)

Jūrų kapitonas
(Lithuanian Naval Force)

Kapitein ter zee
(Royal Netherlands Navy)

=== Portuguese-speaking navies ===
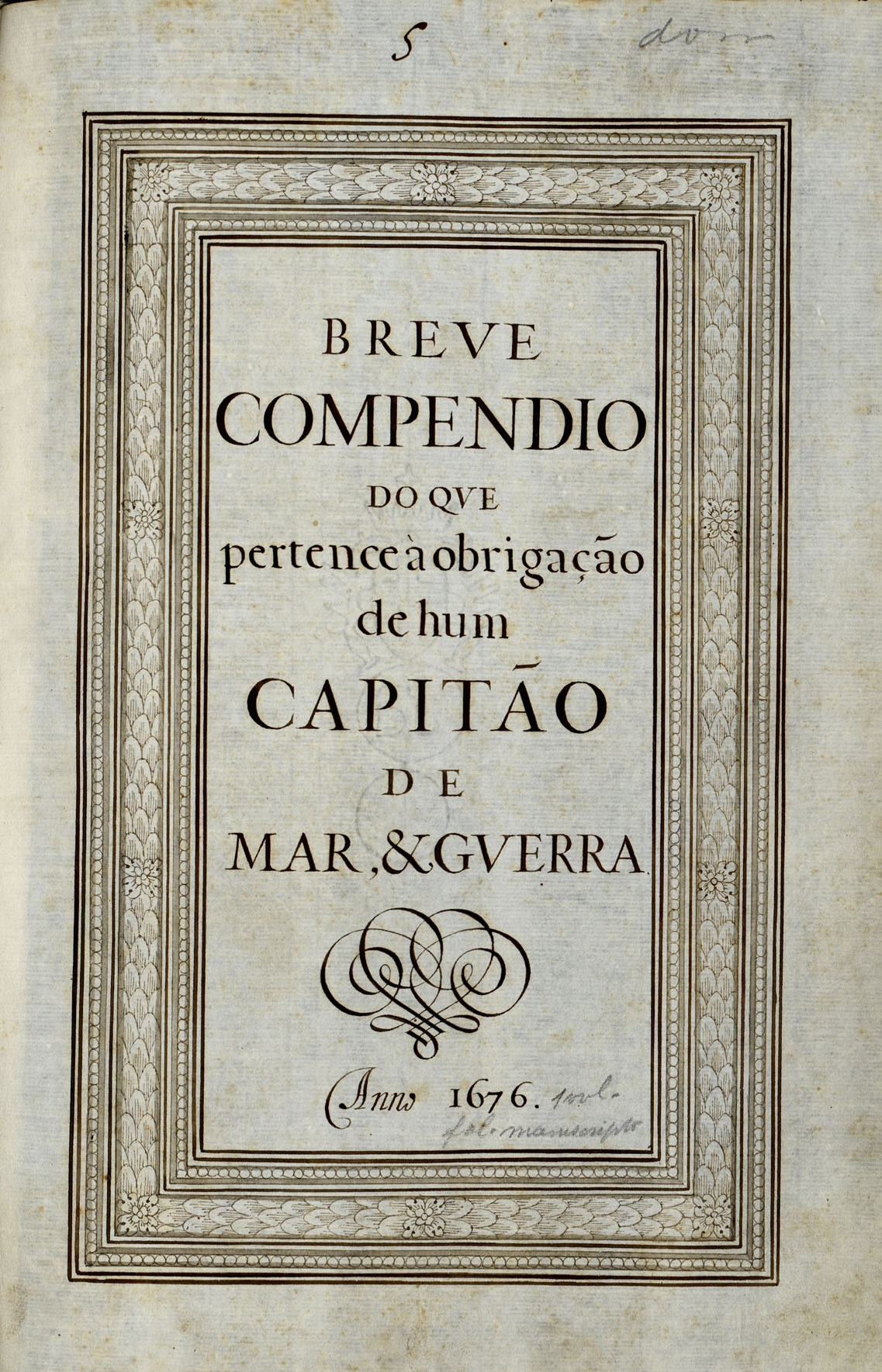
Front page of the Breve Compendio do que pertence à obrigação de hum Capitão de Mar, & Guerra, or "Brief compendium of what pertains to the obligation of a captain of sea and war" (1676)

Captain of sea and war (Portuguese: capitão de mar e guerra, formerly spelled capitão-de-mar-e-guerra) is a rank in most of the Portuguese-speaking navies, notably those of Portugal and Brazil.

The term captain of sea and war, like the modern rank of ship-of-the-line captain in the navies of France, Italy, and Spain, has deep historic roots. Although the rank was first formally established in the 17th century, the expression had been sometimes been used in the Portuguese and Spanish (as Capitán de Mar y Guerra) armadas of the 16th century. But generally, in the 16th and early 17th centuries, the captain of a Portuguese man-of-war was simply called a capitão, while the commander of a fleet was termed capitão-mor, literally "captain-major".

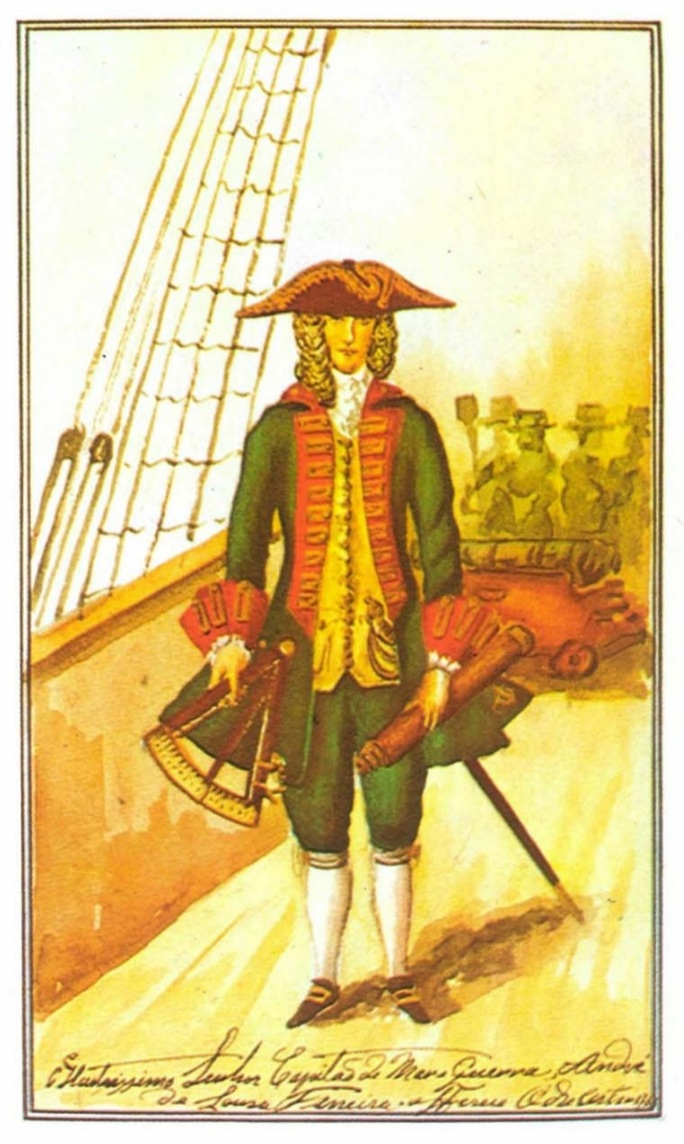
Portrait miniature of the Portuguese captain of sea and war André de Sousa Ferreira in 1751.

During the 16th century, the term almirante was used in Portugal to designate the second in command of a fleet. Only during the 18th century would it come to designate the fleet commander – an admiral in the more modern sense. But during the latter half of the 17th century, the term "captain of sea and war" came to designate the commander of a larger man-of-war - the ship of the line that began evolving at that time. When that happened, the Portuguese Navy, as other navies, came to use the term capitão de fragata and capitão-tenente, literally "frigate captain" and "captain-lieutenant", to designate the commanders of smaller warships. When Brazil gained her independence from Portugal in 1822, its navy adopted the Portuguese rank denominations, which both countries still use.

Capitão de mar e guerra
(Angolan Navy)

Capitão de mar e guerra
(Brazilian Navy)

Capitão de mar e guerra
(Navy of Guinea-Bissau)

Capitão de mar e guerra
(Mozambique Naval Command)

Capitão de mar e guerra
(Portuguese Navy)

Capitão de mar e guerra
(Coast Guard of São Tomé and Príncipe)

Capitão de mar e guerra
(East Timor Navy)

=== Rank captain ===
Captain of the 1st, 2nd and 3rd class are ranks used by the Russian Navy and a number of former communist states. Within NATO forces, the ranks are rated as OF-5, 4 and 3, respectively.

NATO code	OF-5	OF-4	OF-3
	Captain 1st rank	Captain 2nd rank	Captain 3rd rank
English equivalent	Captain	Commander	Lieutenant commander

=== Ship-of-the-line captain ===
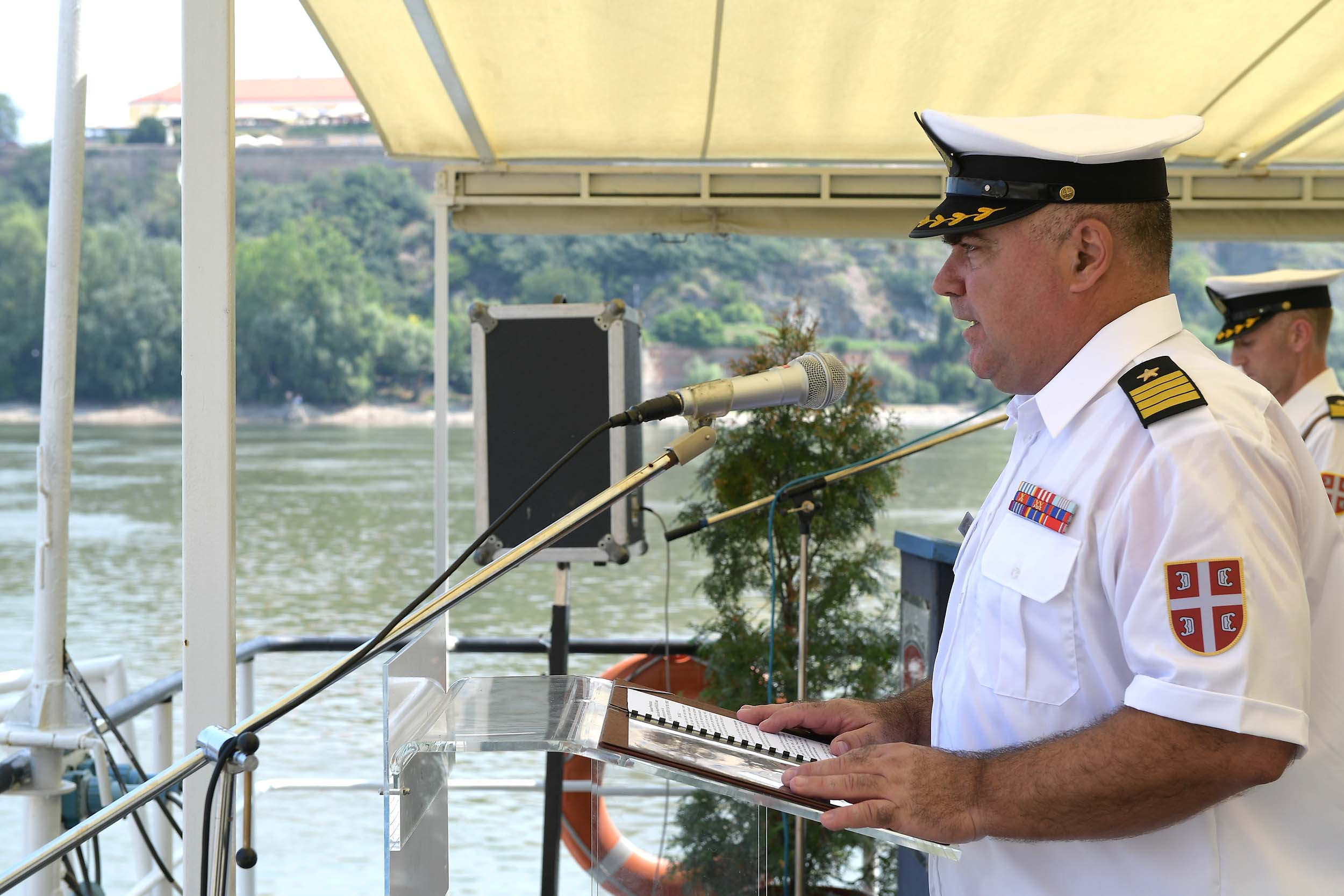
Serbian River Flotilla Ship-of-the-line captain (Serbian: капетан бојног брода, romanized: kapetan bojnog broda)

Ship-of-the-line-captain (French: capitaine de vaisseau; German: Linienschiffskapitän (in the Austro-Hungarian navy); Italian: capitano di vascello; Spanish: capitán de navío; Croatian: kapetan bojnog broda) is a rank that appears in several navies. The name of the rank derives from the fact the rank corresponded to command of a warship of the largest class, the ship-of-the-line, as opposed to smaller types (corvettes and frigates). It is normally above the rank of frigate captain. In all the Scandinavian countries, the rank stems from the Middle Low German word for war (orloch), i.e. war[-ship] captain.

==== France ====
Capitaine de vaisseau is a rank in the French Navy, corresponding to that of colonel in the French Army. They usually command the navy's most important ships.

==== Gallery ====
Capitán de navío
(Argentine Navy)

Capitaine de vaisseau
(Belgian Navy)

Capitaine de vaisseau
(Benin Navy)

Capitán de navío
(Bolivian Navy)

Capitaine de vaisseau
(Cameroon Navy)

Captain (N)
Capitaine de vaisseau
(Royal Canadian Navy)

Capitão–de–navio
(Cape Verdean Coast Guard)

Capitán de navío
(Chilean Navy)

Capitán de navío
(Colombian Navy)

Capitaine de vaisseau
(Navy of the DR of the Congo)

Capitaine de vaisseau
(Congolese Navy)

Kapetan bojnog broda
(Croatian Navy)

Capitán de navío
(Cuban Revolutionary Navy)

Orlogskaptajn
(Royal Danish Navy)

Capitán de navío
(Dominican Navy)

Capitán de navío
(Ecuadorian Navy)

Capitán de navío
(Navy of El Salvador)

Capitaine de vaisseau
(French Navy)

Capitaine de vaisseau
(Gabonese Navy)

Capitaine de vaisseau
(Guinean Navy)

Capitane de vaisseau
(Haitian Navy)

Capitán de navío
(Honduran Navy)

Capitano di vascello
(Italian Navy)

Capitaine de vaisseau major
(Navy of Ivory Coast)

Capitaine de vaisseau
(Navy of Ivory Coast)

Capitaine de vaisseau
(Madagascar Navy)

Capitán de navío
(Mexican Navy)

Kapetan bojnog broda
(Montenegrin Navy)

Capitaine de vaisseau-major
(Royal Moroccan Navy)

Capitaine de vaisseau
(Royal Moroccan Navy)

Capitán de navío
(Nicaraguan Navy)

Orlogskaptein
(Royal Norwegian Navy)

Capitán de navío
(Paraguayan Navy)

Capitán de navío
(Peruvian Navy)

Capitaine de vaisseau
(Senegal Navy)

Капетан Бојног Брода
Kapetan bojnog broda
(Serbian River Flotilla)

Kapitan bojne ladje
(Slovenian Navy)

Capitán de navío
(Spanish Navy)

Örlogskapten
(Swedish Navy)

Capitaine de vaisseau
(Togolese Navy)

Capitaine de vaisseau major
Arabic: عميد بالبحرية, romanized: eamid bialbahria
(Tunisia Navy)

Capitaine de vaisseau
Arabic: عقيد بالبحرية, romanized: eaqid bialbahria
(Tunisia Navy)

Capitán de navío
(National Navy of Uruguay)

Capitán de navío
(Bolivarian Navy of Venezuela)

== See also ==
- Captain (armed forces)
- Captain's cabin
- Captain (United States)
- Captain (Royal Navy)
- Captain (Indian Navy)
- Post-captain
- Sea captain
