= 1987 Haitian general election =

General elections were held in Haiti on 29 November 1987, with a second round planned for 29 December. Voters were to elect the President, 77 deputies and 27 senators. However, the elections were suspended due to a massacre of voters.

== Candidates ==
Among the candidates for president were:

- Marc Bazin (former Minister of Treasury) for the Mouvement Pour la l'Instauration de la Démocratie en Haïti (MIDH).
- Gérard Gourgue for the Front National de Concertation (FNC).
- Louis Déjoie Jr. for the National Agriculture and Industry Party (PAIN).
- Sylvio Claude for the Haiti's Christian Democratic Party (PDCH).
- Hubert de Ronceray for the Moubilisation pour le Developpement National (MDN).
- Leslie Manigat for the Rally of Progressive National Democrats (RDNP).
- Grégoire Eugene for the Social Christian Party of Haiti (PSCH).
- René Théodore for the Unified Party of Haitian Communists (PUCH).
- Francois Latortue for the Mouvement Democratique pour la Liberation d'Haiti (MODELH).
- Gerard Philippe Auguste.
- Rosny Desroche.

Two candidates were assassinated before the elections; Louis Eugene Athis (Democratic Movement for the Liberation of Haiti) on 3 August, and Yves Volel (Christian Democratic Union) on 13 October. On 2 November 1987, the National Electoral Council barred 12 presidential candidates because their support to the late Duvalier regime. Among the rejected candidates were Clovis Desinor (former Minister of Finance), Lieut. General Claude Raymond (former Chief of Staff), General Jean Baptiste Hilaire, Herve Boyer, Edouard Francisque and other army officers and Cabinet ministers. Other rejected candidates were Clemard Joseph Charles, Alphons Lahens, Hillaire Jean-Baptiste, Jean Julme, Edouard Francisque, Jean Theagene, Arthur Bonhomme, Herve Boyer and Franck Romain.

== Electoral roll ==
On 8 November 1987, the date voter registration closed, the Provisional Electoral Council (CEP), with the assistance of 30,000 volunteers, had managed to register 2,246,000 voters, estimated at 73% of the potential electorate.

== Aftermath ==
The elections were cancelled only three hours after polls opened after troops led by Service d'Intelligence National member Lt. Col. Jean-Claude Paul massacred 30–300 voters on election day. Jimmy Carter later wrote that "Citizens who lined up to vote were mowed down by fusillades of terrorists' bullets. Military leaders, who had either orchestrated or condoned the murders, moved in to cancel the election and retain control of the Government." This became known as the Ruelle Vaillant massacre.

That same day, several media outlets were attacked: Radio Haiti-Inter suffered a grenade attack on its facade and Radio Antilles International was attacked with gunfire. A group of 16 men in army uniforms destroyed the transmitter of Radio Soleil.

The elections were followed several months later by the 1988 elections, which was boycotted by almost all the previous candidates, and saw a turnout of just 4%.

== See also ==
- List of massacres in Haiti
