= Haitians in South Florida =

Haitian migration to South Florida has been influenced by politics, economics, and social factors, as well as natural disasters. The 1980 Haitian boatlift brought thousands of refugees fleeing the Duvalier dictatorship, highlighting differences in U.S. treatment of Haitian and Cuban migrants. Many refugees were detained at facilities such as the Krome Avenue Detention Center, which led to legal challenges and protests, during the 1980s and 1990s. Over time, the Haitian community established social networks, and festivals, and supported disaster relief efforts, including those following the 2010 Haiti earthquake.

== 1980s ==
=== Mariel boatlift and refugee arrivals ===
In the early 1980s, the United States faced simultaneous Caribbean migration crises. The Mariel boatlift brought large numbers of Cubans and Haitians to U.S. shores, Haitians had been arriving even sooner than that with arrivals that were smaller but persistent (around 15,000–18,000 in 1980, and 35,500 in March 1981). These Haitian immigrants, the same as Cubans, were also fleeing political oppression, poverty, and the Duvalier dictatorship. Unlike Cubans, who were largely welcomed as political refugees, Haitians were frequently classified as “economic migrants,” when caught at sea, detained or deported. In the 1980s alone, over 25,000 Haitians were intercepted during different times.

The way the U.S. government’s handed Haitian migrants showed gaps in policy and practice. The Carter administration created the "Cuban Haitian entrant" status, a temporary category meant to treat both groups similarly, but for Haitians it lacked efficiency in practice. Under the Reagan administration, extraterritorial ban policies were implemented, allowing U.S. authorities to intercept Haitian vessels offshore and return many migrants without granting asylum, relying on foreign-policy agreements with Haiti rather than domestic immigration law.

Differences in the treatment of Haitian and Cuban migrants revealed political issues in the U.S. refugee policy. Haitian migrants often faced exclusion, while Cuban arrivals were more frequently granted entry and protections, reflecting the influence of Cold War Politics, social status, and broader political considerations. Local media and aid groups, including the Miami Times and the Haitian Refugee Center, responded to these issues through reporting, support efforts, and legal action, such as lawsuits seeking proper refugee classification.

=== Detention of Haitian refugees at Krome Avenue Detention Center (Miami) ===
In the early 1980s, Haitian refugees arriving in the United States were disproportionately detained at facilities such as the Krome Avenue Detention Center in Miami. Originally constructed as a Cold War missile base, Krome was repurposed to house migrants, becoming a central site in the federal government’s emerging detention system.

Conditions at Krome were frequently reported as overcrowded and unsanitary, with small access to medical care and prolonged confinement without fair hearings. Haitian detainees were often assigned the “entrant” status, which excluded them from asylum protections and due process, effectively criminalizing their presence. Many refugees protested through hunger strikes, riots and escape attempts asserting agency against restrictive and oppressive conditions.

Legal challenges brought national attention to the plight of Haitian refugees. Aid organizations, including the Haitian Refugee Center (HRC), alongside civil rights and religious groups, filed lawsuits such as Louis v. Nelson and Jean v. Nelson, arguing that U.S. detention practices violated basic rights and were racially discriminatory. While some temporary victories were achieved, these cases ultimately highlighted how the federal government relied on detention and helped shape a broader, more efficient immigration enforcement approach.

== 1990s Haitian refugee protests ==
The Haitian refugee protest of the 1990s built upon earlier struggles from the 1980s, when Haitians arriving alongside Cuban Mariel refugees were denied asylum and disproportionately detained at facilities like Krome Avenue Detention center in Miami. The 1980s established a precedent that Cubans were welcomed as political refugees of communism, while Haitians were treated as “economic migrants,” subject to exclusion, mass detention, and bans at sea.

By the early 1990s, the political crisis in Haiti once again intensified refugee flows. The 1991 Aristide coup that overthrew Haiti’s first democratically elected president, Jean-Bertrand Aristide, forced thousands to flee. Most Haitians caught at sea were sent back under the Reagan and Bush interdiction administration, with only a small fraction given access to asylum.

Haitian-American communities organized large protests throughout Miami, particularly targeting Immigration and Naturalization Service (INS) offices. Demonstrations included marches, hunger strikes, and sanctuary movements led by churches. These protests gained visibility in U.S. media, especially as civil rights and religious groups joined in solidarity. Activists highlighted the contrasts between U.S. support for Cuban refugees and the systematic exclusion of Haitians, framing the issues as one of racial discrimination and human rights.

== 2010 earthquake relief efforts in Florida ==
On January 12, 2010, a magnitude 7.0 earthquake struck near Port-au-Prince, Haiti, killing more than 200,000 people, injuring hundreds of thousands, and displacing millions. The disaster’s effects went far beyond Haiti. In South Florida, home to one of the largest Haitian populations in the United States, the earthquake triggered immediate humanitarian, legal, and emotional responses. With approximately 263,000 Haitian residents in the region, the crisis became an event that tested local institutions, federal policy.

Florida quickly emerged as a hub for relief efforts. Miami became the main entry point for international aid shipments, and hospitals such as Jackson Memorial treated severely injured evacuees despite strained resources. Local school districts adapted rapidly to accommodate newly arrived children, classifying many as “homeless” under federal law to ensure access to transportation and educational help. At the same time, federal authorities feared a mass migration but instead received a smaller influx of U.S. citizens, legal residents, and medical evacuees from Haiti.

Allowing them to remain and work legally. While uptake was hindered by high application fees, complex requirements, and fear of detection, TPS marked a step in recognizing Haitians’ burdens after repeated denials in earlier crises.

In neighborhoods such as Little Haiti in Miami, community organizations, churches, and nonprofits mobilized relief drives, fundraising campaigns, and legal clinics. Surveys conducted in the community revealed widespread grief. For example, more than two-thirds of residents reported losing or having relatives injured in the earthquake. Coping was rooted in spiritual and community practices, including prayer, and Bible reading, while professional counseling was rarely accessed due to stigma and limited availability.
