= Sadrac Saintil =

Haitian military officer

Chief of the General Staff of the Armed Forces of Haiti Chef de l'État-Major Général des Forces Armées d'Haïti (French)
- In office 27 March 2018 – October 2024
- Preceded by: vacant
- Succeeded by: Brigadier General Emmanuel Azémar

Personal details
- Born: 29 January 1953 (age 73) Haiti

Military service
- Allegiance: Haiti
- Branch/service: Haitian Army
- Years of service: ?-1994; 2017–2024
- Rank: Brigadier General

Sadrac Saintil is a Haitian military officer. He was named in a presidential decree by President Jovenel Moïse in 2017 to be part of the General Staff of the reestablished Armed Forces of Haiti. He last served as the Chief of the General staff of the Armed Forces.

Saintil, then a lieutenant colonel, participated in the official whitewash of the 1994 Raboteau massacre, during the military dictatorship of Raoul Cédras.
