= 1987 Haitian election massacre =

1987 massacre in Haiti

The 1987 Haitian election massacre (also known as the Ruelle Vaillant massacre) was a mass killing that occurred on 29 November 1987 in Port-au-Prince during Haiti's first attempted democratic election after the fall of the Duvalier dictatorship. Armed men, including paramilitaries and individuals linked to the National Intelligence Service, Haitian military and the former Duvalierist secret police Tonton Macoute, attacked voters gathered at polling stations, most notably on Ruelle Vaillant street in Port-au-Prince. The massacre resulted in dozens of deaths and led to the cancellation of the national election process.

Aftermath of the massacre in Ruelle Vaillant.
