= National Council of Government (Haiti) =

The National Council of Government (French: Conseil National de Gouvernement, CNG) was the ruling body of Haiti from 1986 to 1988.

== History ==
The council was first established on February 7, 1986, as a joint military and civilian provisional government following the exile of President for life Jean-Claude Duvalier, at the height of the anti-Duvalier protest movement. The council, under the presidency of Lieutenant General Henri Namphy, consisted of five members, three from the military and two civilians. The military members were Colonels Williams Régala, Max Valles, and Prosper Avril. In contrast the civilian members were Gérard Gourgue and Alix Cinéas.

Gourgue resigned from the council less than two months after it was formed, and Colonel Valles, Colonel Avril, and Cinéas were forced to resign soon after. The first National Council was officially dissolved on March 20, 1986. During its short life, the council took two important actions: it dissolved President Duvalier's paramilitary forces, the Tonton Macoute (French: Volontaires de la Sécurité Nationale, VSN) on February 15, and restored the blue and red flag of Haiti on February 17.

A second National Council with three constituents was established on March 21, 1986, the day after the first council was dissolved. The two remaining men of the first council, Henri Namphy and Williams Régala, kept their positions. Jacques A François joined the council as the second member. This version of the National Council ruled until February 7, 1988, when Leslie Manigat (elected in the 1988 general election) took office as President of Haiti.
