= Service d'Intelligence National =

Service d'Intelligence National (National Intelligence Service, SIN) was a Haitian intelligence agency created by the US Central Intelligence Agency after the 1986 overthrow of Jean-Claude Duvalier, at the height of the Anti-Duvalier protest movement. The unit, staffed by officers of the Armed Forces of Haiti, "engaged in drug trafficking and political violence". The CIA provided half a million to a million dollars per year to train SIN in counter-narcotics, but the group produced no intelligence and instead used their training against political opponents.

The 1987 Haitian general election was cancelled after troops led by SIN member Col Jean Claude Paul massacred 30 – 300 voters on election day. Jimmy Carter later wrote that

"Citizens who lined up to vote were mowed down by fusillades of terrorists' bullets. Military leaders, who had either orchestrated or condoned the murders, moved in to cancel the election and retain control of the Government."

Despite this the CIA continued to give the SIN up to $1m per year, even as the SIN continued to target political opponents. Between 1986 and 1991 SIN murdered up to 5000 members of democratic movements.

The CIA only cut its ties to SIN after the 1991 Haitian coup d'état which ended Jean-Bertrand Aristide's 8-month Presidency, following the 1990–91 Haitian general election. Its support for SIN, and SIN's involvement in drug trafficking, became public in 1993.

Emmanuel Constant has said that he helped found SIN.
