= St. Jean Bosco massacre =

Mass killing in Haiti

Coordinates: 18.516°N 72.285°W

The St. Jean Bosco massacre took place in Haiti on 11 September 1988. At least 13 people (it is impossible to say how many; some sources say 50) were killed and around 80 wounded in a three-hour assault on the Saint-Jean Bosco church in Port-au-Prince, which saw the church burned down.

The church was the parish of future President Jean-Bertrand Aristide, then a liberation theology Roman Catholic priest of the Salesians of Don Bosco order, and had been packed with 1000 people for Sunday mass. Aristide, who had survived at least six attempts on his life after a fiery 1985 Mass had helped spark the unrest which eventually led to the 1986 overthrow of the dictator Jean-Claude Duvalier, was evacuated from the church into a residence inside the church compound.

According to the Inter-American Commission on Human Rights, the following day, "five men and one woman appeared on the government controlled television station (Télé Nationale) and admitted their participation in the attack on the church. They threatened a 'heap of corpses' at any future mass celebrated by Aristide. Many people were outraged that these individuals could appear on television, without any disguise, confess their participation in these events and threaten future criminal acts with no fear of being arrested by the authorities."

The massacre contributed to the emergence a week later of the September 1988 Haitian coup d'état against the Henri Namphy regime, which brought to power Prosper Avril. In 1993 Antoine Izméry was assassinated at a mass commemorating the massacre.

== Responsibility ==
The massacre was carried out by unidentified armed men, probably former Tonton Macoute, and took place without resistance by police or army, despite the church being opposite a barracks. According to one witness, the police and army provided protection for the attackers, encircling the church. In November 1988 armed men led by a uniformed soldier murdered Michelet Dubreus and Jean Félix - two members of the popular organization Verité who had signed a public letter identifying participants in the massacre.

The Mayor of Port-au-Prince at the time, Franck Romain, a former Tonton Macoute leader, was accused of being involved. Romain, the former chief of police during the Duvalier regime, said Aristide had been "justly punished". One witness said he saw Romain himself at the massacre, alongside his men; a number of witnesses saw city hall employees among the attackers.

On New Year's Eve Romain, who had taken refuge in the embassy of the Dominican Republic after the September coup, was granted safe passage out of the country, having been granted political asylum by the Dominican Republic. Human Rights Watch said that the Avril regime's decision was a political, not a legal one, as the regime had the legal option of not granting safe passage, and had made no effort to challenge the Republic's asylum decision.

In 1991, after Aristide had been elected President in the Haitian general election, 1990–1991, his Minister of Justice accused Romain of responsibility, and sought his extradition from the Dominican Republic, where he was living in exile, without success.

== See also ==
- List of massacres in Haiti
