= Brenda Gayle Plummer =

American academic and historian

Brenda Gayle Plummer (born 1946) is an American academic and historian whose areas of research are the history of Haiti and African-American history. She is the Merze Tate Professor of History at the University of Wisconsin-Madison.

== Biography ==
Plummer was born in 1946. She earned a Bachelor of Arts from Antioch College, a Master of Arts from Columbia University, and a Ph.D. from Cornell University.

She has written and contributed to several books about the history of Haiti and African-American history in the United States.

She was a 1999–2000 fellow of the National Humanities Center. She was named the Merze Tate Professor of History at the University of Wisconsin-Madison in 2012.

== Selected works ==
=== As author ===
- Haiti and the Great Powers, 1902-1915. Louisiana State University Press, 1988.
- Haiti and the United States: The Psychological Moment. University of Georgia Press, 1992.
- Rising Wind: Black Americans and Foreign Affairs, 1935-1960. University of North Carolina Press, 1996.
- In Search of Power: African Americans in the Era of Decolonization, 1956–1974. Cambridge University Press, 2012.

=== As contributor ===
- "Making 'Brown Babies": Race and Gender after World War II'. Body and Nation: The Global Realm of U.S. Body Politics in the Twentieth Century. Edited by Emily S. Rosenberg and Shanon Fitzpatrick. Duke University Press, 2014.

=== As editor ===
- Window on Freedom: Race, Civil Rights, and Foreign Affairs, 1945-1988. University of North Carolina Press, 2003.
