= Alex Dupuy =

American sociologist

Alex Dupuy is a retired sociology professor emeritus and author in the United States. He chaired Wesleyan University’s African American Studies department and was its John E. Andrus Professor of Sociology. Born in Haiti, he has written books and essays on Haiti. An oral interview with him was recorded by Wesleyan in March 2019.

Dupuy's work engages with the writings of Karl Marx and the history of capitalism. He argues for the primary importance of class in understanding the Haitian Revolution, writing that race is a "purely ideological construct developed in the seventeenth and eighteenth centuries to justify the enslavement of Africans in the European colonies of the Americas". He criticized the common understanding of how the Revolution affected Hegel's concept of the "master-slave dialectic", arguing that Hegel's racism and his ignorance about slavery in the Americas makes this supposed influence profoundly unlikely.

== Writings ==
- “A Neo-Liberal Model for Post-Duvalier Haiti,” unpublished manuscript, 1995
- Haiti: From Revolutionary Slaves to Powerless Citizens: Essays on the Politics and Economics of Underdevelopment, 1804–2013, Westview Press (1988)
- The Prophet and Power; Jean-Bertrand Aristide, the international community, and Haiti, Rowman & Littlefield (2007)
- Haiti In The World Economy; Class, Race, And Underdevelopment Since 1700, Routledge (2019), reprint of 1989 book
- Rethinking the Haitian Revolution; Slavery, Independence, and the Struggle for Recognition Rowman & Littlefield (2019)
- Haiti in the New World Order; The Limits of Democratic Revolution Westview Press (1997)

=== Articles (selected) ===
- “Slavery and underdevelopment in the Caribbean: A critique of the “plantation economy” perspective” 1983
