= Defence Force of Haiti =

Planned armed forces of the Republic of Haiti

The Defence Force of Haiti (French: Force de Défense d'Haïti) was the envisaged name of the planned, reconstituted armed forces of the Republic of Haiti. Haiti had not had a regular armed forces since 1995; a process to reestablish them was initiated in 2011 and culminated in their remobilization under the old name, Forces Armées d'Haiti (FAd'H)), on November 18th, 2017.

== See also ==
- Gendarmerie of Haiti
- Military history of Haiti
- Armed Forces of Haiti
