= Michel François =

Colonel in the Haitian army

Joseph-Michel François (French pronunciation: [ʒozɛf miʃɛl fʁɑ̃swa]; 1957 – 2017) was a colonel in the Haitian army. As Haiti Chief of National Police he participated in the 1991 Haitian coup d'état, which overthrew Haiti's elected president, Jean-Bertrand Aristide. Former Haitian President candidate Michel "Sweet Mickey" Martelly is known to have associated with François.

== Background ==
François attended US command school at Fort Bragg.

== Chief of National Police (1991-94) ==
He helped topple Haiti's elected president, Jean-Bertrand Aristide. He then terrorized his country as chief of the police and secret police under dictator General Raoul Cédras; some 4,000 Haitians were killed. François fled the country in 1994 to the Dominican Republic. Though convicted in Haiti of assassinating an Aristide supporter, he was never extradited. When the Dominican Republic deported him for plotting another coup d'etat in Haiti, François landed in San Pedro Sula, Honduras.

He was convicted in absentia for his part in the 1993 murder of Antoine Izméry.

== Drug charges ==
A convicted drug dealer told the US Senate Foreign Relations Committee that he met François in Colombia, and that François told him he was arranging a cocaine deal. United States prosecutors indicted François in March, 1997 and charged him with smuggling 33 tons of cocaine and heroin into the U.S. from his private airstrip in Haiti, while taking millions in bribes from Colombian drug lords. François denied the charges and stayed in a Honduran prison until July, 1997, when the Honduran Supreme Court turned down U.S. extradition efforts for lack of evidence and subsequently released François.

== Death ==
Michel François died suddenly in February 2017 reportedly in Honduras. His legacy remains intertwined with Haiti’s complex political history and the human rights abuses committed during his time in power.
