= June 1988 Haitian coup d'état =

Military overthrow of Leslie Manigat

Date	20 June 1988
Location	Haiti
Status	Leslie Manigat overthrown

Belligerents
Armed Forces of Haiti	(Haiti) Haitian government

Commanders and leaders
(Haiti) Henri Namphy	(Haiti) Leslie Manigat

The June 1988 Haitian coup d'état took place on 20 June 1988, when Henri Namphy overthrew Leslie Manigat. Manigat, who won the military-controlled 1988 general election, had taken office on 7 February.

On 14 June 1988, a number of military reassignments were made by Henri Namphy, including transferring Colonel Jean-Claude Paul to army headquarters and making him Assistant Head of the General Staff. Paul telephoned President Leslie Manigat to protest the move, and the following day Manigat issued a statement cancelling the changes, and saying that he, as constitutional head of the Armed Forces of Haiti, had not been consulted. On 19 June Manigat retired Namphy, saying he had been preparing a coup. On 20 June Namphy ousted Manigat in a coup d'état, declaring himself President with Col. Jean-Claude Paul at his side.

The coup was followed some months later by the September 1988 coup d'état in which Prosper Avril overthrew Henri Namphy.
