= 1989 Haitian coup attempt =

Attempted military overthrow of Prosper Avril

1989 Haitian coup d'état attempt
Date	1–2 April 1989
Location	Haiti
Status	Coup attempt fails

Belligerents
Armed Forces of Haiti (loyalist faction)	Armed Forces of Haiti (rogue faction)

Commanders and leaders
(Haiti) Prosper Avril	(Haiti) Himmler Rebu

The 1989 Haitian coup d'état attempt was a bloodless military coup attempt that took place in Haiti on 1–2 April 1989, when a group of rebel army officers attempted to overthrow the military government of Lt. Gen. Prosper Avril.

The coup attempt, which included gunfire near the National Palace, was reportedly staged by Col. Himmler Rebu, commander of the elite Leopards battalion (stationed in Pétion-Ville, close to the capital Port-au-Prince). The attempt was foiled by loyalist troops, who rescued Avril as he was being driven away by rebel soldiers to the Port-au-Prince Airport, to be deported to the neighboring Dominican Republic.
