= Raoul Cédras =

Haitian military officer and politician

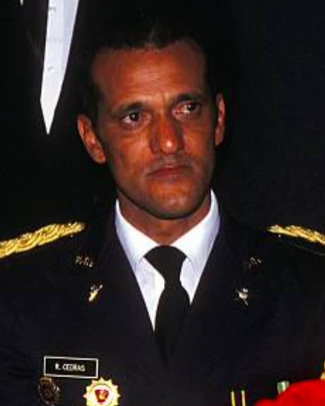
- Cédras, 1991–94

Leader of the Haitian military junta
- In office September 29, 1991 – October 12, 1994
- President: See list: Himself (de facto); Joseph Nérette (acting); Marc Bazin (acting); Jean-Bertrand Aristide; Émile Jonassaint (acting)
- Deputy: Philippe Biamby
- Preceded by: Junta established
- Succeeded by: Junta abolished

President of Haiti
- De facto
- In office September 29, 1991 – October 8, 1991
- Prime Minister: See list: René Préval; Jean-Jacques Honorat; Marc Bazin; Robert Malval
- Preceded by: Jean-Bertrand Aristide
- Succeeded by: Joseph Nérette (acting)

Personal details
- Born: Joseph Raoul Cédras; July 9, 1949 (age 77) Jérémie, Haiti
- Spouse: Yanick Prosper
- Occupation: Military officer

Military service
- Allegiance: Haiti
- Branch/service: Haitian Army
- Rank: Lieutenant General

Joseph Raoul Cédras (born July 9, 1949) is a Haitian former military officer who ruled his country de facto from 1991 to 1994. As the last military ruler of Haiti, Cédras took power in the 1991 Haitian coup d'état against President Jean-Bertrand Aristide before agreeing to relinquish control of the government back to Aristide during Operation Uphold Democracy in 1994.

== Background ==
A mulatto, Cédras was educated at the School of the Americas and was a member of the U.S.-trained "Leopard Corps". He also trained with the Spanish military. Cédras was chosen by the US and France to be in charge of security for the 1990–91 Haitian general election, and subsequently named Commander-in-Chief of the Armed Forces by Jean-Bertrand Aristide in early 1991. Under Aristide, Cédras "was one important source for the CIA, providing reports critical of President Aristide."

== Leadership ==
Cédras, Lieutenant General in the Forces Armées d'Haïti (FAdH; the Armed Forces of Haiti) at the time, was responsible for the 1991 Haitian coup d'état which ousted President Aristide on 29 September 1991.

Some human rights groups criticized Cédras' rule, alleging that innocent people were killed by the FAdH military and FRAPH paramilitary units. The US State Department said in 1995 that in the three years following the coup "international observers estimated that more than 3,000 men, women and children were murdered by or with the complicity of Haiti's then-coup regime."

While remaining the de facto leader of Haiti as commander of the country's armed forces, Cédras did not retain his position as head of state, preferring to have other politicians as official presidents. As required by Article 149 of the 1987 Haitian Constitution, Haiti's Parliament appointed Supreme Court Justice Joseph Nérette as provisional President, to fill in until elections could be held. The elections were planned for December 1991, but Nérette resigned and was replaced undemocratically by Supreme Court Justice Émile Jonassaint.

Under the delegation of U.S. President Bill Clinton and one of his predecessors Jimmy Carter, alongside Sam Nunn and Colin Powell, urged Provisional President Émile Jonassaint to relinquish his control in 1994, in order to avoid a potential invasion. Jonassaint resigned. Cédras had indicated his desire to remain in Haiti. However, the Americans did not think this was the best solution and convinced the General that in the national interest, he should consider departing for Panama. The United States reportedly gave Cédras $1 million and rented three properties as incentive to leave power.

== Later life ==
After leaving Haiti, Cédras went to Panama, where he remains. In Panama, he dedicated himself to private enterprise, setting up a color separation company that he himself directed. Aristide returned to power in Haiti in 1994, was re-elected to the presidency in 2000, and was forced into resigning again in a 2004 coup.

== Documentary ==
- Uden titel (1996)

== See also ==
- Operation Uphold Democracy

Political offices
| Preceded by Jean-Bertrand Aristide as President of Haiti | Leader of the Haitian Military Junta; 1991–1994 | Succeeded by Jean-Bertrand Aristide as President of Haiti |
Military offices
| Preceded by Hérard Abraham | Commander-in-Chief of the Armed Forces of Haiti; 1991–1994 | Succeeded by Jean-Claude Duperval; Acting |
