= Jean-Jacques Honorat =

Haitian politician (1931–2023)

3rd Prime Minister of Haiti
- In office October 11, 1991 – June 19, 1992
- President: Joseph Nérette (provisional)
- Preceded by: René Préval
- Succeeded by: Marc Bazin

Minister of Foreign Affairs and Worship
- In office October 15, 1991 – December 16, 1991
- President: Joseph Nérette
- Prime Minister: Jean-Jacques Honorat (himself)
- Preceded by: Jean-Robert Sabalat
- Succeeded by: Jean-Robert Simonise

Personal details
- Born: April 1, 1931 Port-au-Prince, Haiti
- Died: July 26, 2023 (aged 92) Port-au-Prince, Haiti
- Party: Independent
- Spouse: Yvelie Honorat
- Profession: Juris Doctor, Agronomist

Jean-Jacques Honorat (April 1, 1931 – July 26, 2023) was a Haitian politician who served as the prime minister of Haiti after the 1991 coup d'état from 1991 until 1992. He was a human rights activist and philanthropist for over 60 years. He was also an author having published 16 books, including a book titled Le manifeste du dernier monde in 1980.

== Biography ==
Honorat was born on April 1, 1931, in Port-au-Prince. After completing his degrees in agronomy and law, he became a human rights activist. He had been an activist for 40 years before becoming prime minister, while also working as a professor of law and human rights. The philanthropist and humanitarian was accused of having ties to François Duvalier. Honorat stated that their families were, indeed, close and in fact, there were family ties between them. However, in a December 1991 phone interview with correspondents from Washington D.C.'s EIR, he also stated that he quickly became an activist after Duvalier staged the 1961 coup, which was why he left his position as tourist director. The rift between families would lead to Honorat's eventual exile to New York after Francois' son, Jean-Claude Duvalier, unjustly expelled him from the country in 1980. Honorat became prime minister of Haiti on October 11, 1991. President Nérette and Honorat spoke out against the U.S.-led embargoes, calling them genocides. Like many other prime ministers since 1988, Honorat's term would be short-lived and ended after interference by corrupt military officials. He spent eight months in office. He also served as Minister of Foreign Affairs and Worship from October to December 1991.

Honorat continued to be praised in the diplomatic arena. His degrees in agronomy and law, along with his fluency in French, Spanish, Creole, Mandarin, German, and English, served him well throughout his career.

Honorat was also an author, publishing his first book Le manifeste du dernier monde in 1980.

Jean-Jacques Honorat died in Port-au-Prince on July 26, 2023, at the age of 92.
