= Prosper Avril =

Haitian political figure (born 1937)

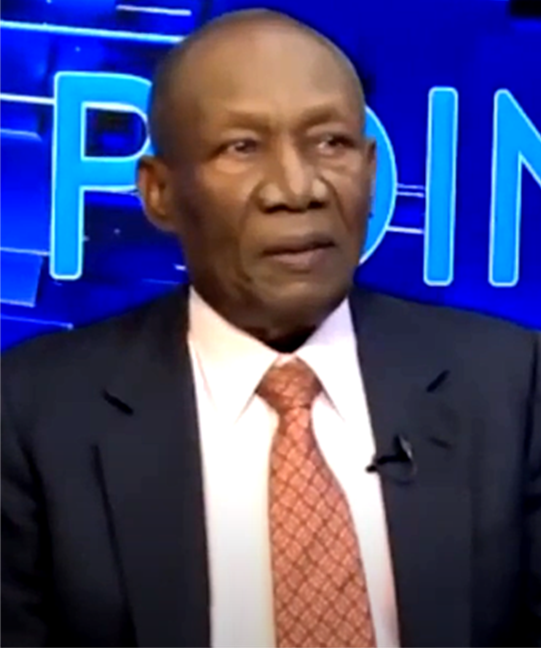

38th President of Haiti
- In office September 17, 1988 – March 10, 1990
- Preceded by: Henri Namphy
- Succeeded by: Hérard Abraham

Commander-in-chief of the Armed Forces of Haiti
- In office September 17, 1988 – March 10, 1990
- President: Himself
- Preceded by: Carl-Michel Nicolas
- Succeeded by: Herard Abraham

Member of the Provisional Government of Haiti
- In office February 7, 1987 – March 21, 1987
- President: Henri Namphy

Personal details
- Born: Matthieu Prosper Avril; December 12, 1937 (age 88) Thomazeau, Haiti
- Party: National Progressive Party
- Spouse: Marie-Ange Nazon

Matthieu Prosper Avril (born December 12, 1937) is a Haitian political figure who was President of Haiti from 1988 to 1990. A trusted member of François Duvalier's presidential guard and adviser to Jean-Claude Duvalier, Lt. Gen. Avril led the September 1988 Haitian coup d'état against a transition military government installed after Jean-Claude Duvalier's 1986 overthrow. He was president until March 1990, in a period which according to Amnesty International was "marred by serious human rights violations". He was arrested in 2001, but released in March 2004 after the 2004 Haitian coup d'état overthrew Jean-Bertrand Aristide.

== Background ==
Avril was born in the small town of Thomazeau, near Haiti's capital, Port-au-Prince. He joined the army, and graduated at the head of his class in the academy. His wife was a nurse.

== Career ==
As a junior officer, Avril served as a member of the presidential guard for François Duvalier. He then became an advisor to Jean-Claude Duvalier upon the latter's inauguration in 1971. Duvalier-era government officials told Reuters that Avril oversaw all of Duvalier's financial accounts. Avril was forced into retirement by Jean-Claude Duvalier in 1983, but was reinstated and promoted to Colonel in 1986 in the face of the popular revolt that lead to Duvalier's overthrow. In a March 1986 interview with the Manchester Guardian, Avril declared that Haitian refugees in other countries should be required to apply for visas when visiting Haiti; this would keep out "people who want to foment disorder." He also predicted that Haiti would have to wait for free elections.

Avril was viewed positively by many fellow members of the armed forces; he was also an academy classmate of Brig. Gen. Williams Regala, one of the leaders of the post-Duvalier military junta. Although the junta members allowed Avril to join the government as a political adviser, he was forced to resign after public demonstrations due to his Duvalier connections. He soon rejoined the presidential guard, and assisted junta chief Henri Namphy in the June 1988 Haitian coup d'état which overthrew Leslie Manigat. Manigat was a civilian president who had been elected in a military-controlled election; he had taken office in February 1988. Avril was first promoted to brigadier general, then to lieutenant general by Namphy.

=== Presidency ===
In September 1988, a week after the St. Jean Bosco massacre, Avril overthrew his former ally Namphy in a bloodless coup. As Avril had given few interviews, foreign media sources were unfamiliar with his political views. American policy analyst Larry Birns described Avril as being "particularly corrupt" among the members of the Duvalier regime, but also "intelligent and crafty."

Avril served as President of Haiti from September 17, 1988 to March 10, 1990. Amnesty International described his rule as "marred by serious human rights violations." He initially raised goodwill by meeting with social and religious leaders and appointing a civilian cabinet. He also restored the 1987 Constitution of Haiti in March 1989. However, the U.S. government required Avril to crack down on drug trafficking in exchange for foreign aid; his arrests of involved army members dented his popularity. Avril put down a coup attempt by disgruntled officers in April 1989. Civilian opposition groups also demanded that Avril deliver on his promise to hold elections; in response, he began deporting their leaders. He traveled to Taiwan in January 1990 for his first foreign visit. Before his arrival, civil activists informed Taiwan via Telex that any contracts with the military regime would not be recognized by a civilian government. Avril returned home empty-handed; in retaliation, he ordered feces to be dumped outside the offices of opposition groups.

After mass public protests, Avril transferred power to the army chief of staff, Gen. Hérard Abraham, on March 10, 1990. Avril went into exile in Miami, Florida; he moved to the Dominican Republic after he was refused entry into Haiti in 1992. He returned to Haiti in 1993. He fled again in 1995 after the Haitian government moved to arrest him in connection with the assassination of a government official during his time in power. He was finally arrested in 2001, shortly after Jean-Bertrand Aristide was elected president, for allegedly plotting against the state. Avril was released in 2002 after an appeals court ruled that the government presented "insufficient evidence"; he was immediately rearrested and charged with organizing a 1990 massacre of farmers. He was freed after Aristide was ousted in the 2004 Haitian coup d'état.

=== Miami ===
At the time Aristide came to power, Prosper Avril lived in Miami despite the fact that he would be easily recognizable. This high-profile also made him the target of rumors, and so when two Haitian radio journalists were assassinated during the first weeks and month after Aristide took power, Avril became the target of rumors that declared his involvement. He recounts this experience in his book, An Appeal to History: The Truth about a Singular Lawsuit.

== Publications in English ==
- An Appeal to History: The Truth about a Singular Lawsuit. Universal-Publishers, 1999.
- From Glory to Disgrace: The Haitian Army, 1804–1994. Universal-Publishers, 1999.
- Haiti (1995–2000): The Black Book on Insecurity. Universal-Publishers, 2004.
- Justice Versus Politics in Haiti (2001–2004). Universal-Publishers, 2007.

== See also ==
- List of heads of state of Haiti

Political offices
Preceded by Henri Namphy	President of Haiti; 1988–1990	Succeeded by Hérard Abraham
