= 1988 Haitian general election =

- 17 January 1988
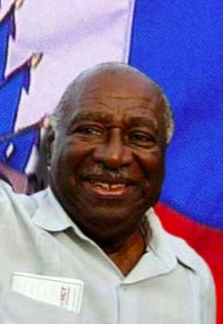
| Nominee | Leslie Manigat | Hubert de Ronceray | Gérard Philippe Auguste |
| Party | RPND | MDN | MOP |
| Popular vote | 534,110 | 209,526 | 151,391 |
| Percentage | 50.22% | 19.70% | 14.23% |
President before election
Henri Namphy
Military regime
Elected President
Leslie Manigat
RPND

General elections were held in Haiti on 17 January 1988, after the 1987 general elections had been cancelled due to an election day massacre of voters either orchestrated or condoned by the military. The elections were boycotted by most candidates who had contested the previous elections, and while the official voter turnout figure was stated to be around 35%, observers and foreign officials estimated it to be no more than 10%, with some putting it at lower than 4%.

The official results were made public on 24 January, and it was a victory for Leslie Manigat of the Rally of Progressive National Democrats. However, six months later, he was removed from office in a military coup on 20 June.

== Results ==
=== President ===
| Candidate | Party | Votes | % |
|---|---|---|---|
| Leslie Manigat | Rally of Progressive National Democrats | 534,110 | 50.22 |
| Hubert de Ronceray | Movement for National Development | 209,526 | 19.70 |
| Gérard Philippe Auguste | Peasant Worker Movement | 151,391 | 14.23 |
| Grégoire Eugène | Social Christian Party | 97,556 | 9.17 |
| Alphonse Lahèns | Haitian Progressive National Movement | 34,371 | 3.23 |
| Michel Lamartinière Honorat | National Union of Democratic Forces | 16,550 | 1.56 |
| Jean Théagène | National Union of Haitian Democrats | 15,113 | 1.42 |
| Hugo Noël | | 2,892 | 0.27 |
| Arnold Dumas | National Party of Workers' Defence | 1,264 | 0.12 |
| Hector Estimé | | 471 | 0.04 |
| Dieuveuil Joseph | | 149 | 0.01 |
| Lysias Verret | | 77 | 0.01 |
| Edouard Francisque | Union for Haitian Renewal | 59 | 0.01 |
| Raphaël François | | 8 | 0.00 |
| Total | | 1,063,537 | 100.00 |
Source: Nohlen
