= Henri Namphy =

Haitian military officer and politician (1932–2018)

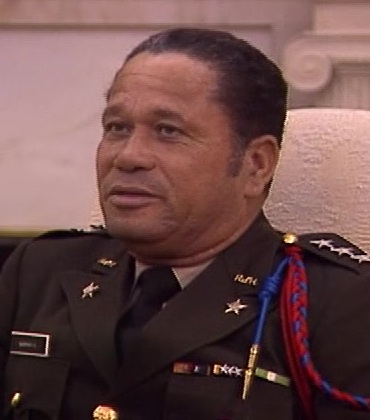
- Namphy in the Oval Office of the White House, 20 November 1986

36th President of Haiti
- In office 20 June 1988 – 17 September 1988
- Preceded by: Leslie Manigat
- Succeeded by: Prosper Avril
- In office 7 February 1986 – 7 February 1988 (Provisional)
- Preceded by: Jean-Claude Duvalier
- Succeeded by: Leslie Manigat

Commander-in-chief of the Armed Forces of Haiti
- In office 4 November 1987 – 17 June 1988
- President: Himself; Leslie Manigat
- Preceded by: Himself (as Chief of the General Staff of the Army)
- Succeeded by: Morton Gousse (Interim)

Chief of the General Staff of the Army
- In office 23 March 1984 – 4 November 1987
- President: Jean-Claude Duvalier; Himself
- Preceded by: Roger Saint-Albin
- Succeeded by: Himself (as Commander-in-chief of the Armed Forces of Haiti)

Personal details
- Born: 2 October 1932 Grande-Rivière-du-Nord, Haiti
- Died: 26 June 2018 (aged 85) Dominican Republic
- Resting place: Cristo Redentor cemetery, Santo Domingo
- Spouse(s): Gisèle Célestin, Therese Gabrielle Célestin, Altagracia Marte
- Relations: Elisabeth Delatour Préval (niece)
- Children: 2

Military service
- Allegiance: Haiti
- Branch/service: Haitian Army
- Rank: Lieutenant General

Henri Namphy (French pronunciation: [ɑ̃ʁi nɑ̃fi]; 2 October 1932 – 26 June 2018) was a Haitian general and political figure who served as President of Haiti's interim ruling body, the National Council of Government, from 7 February 1986 to 7 February 1988. He served again as President of Haiti from 20 June 1988 after the June 1988 coup that he led, until his deposition on September 17, 1988 in the September coup.

Following the fall of the government headed by President-for-Life Jean-Claude Duvalier, who fled the country with his family in 1986, Lieutenant General Namphy became president of the interim governing council, made up of six civilian and military members, which promised elections and democratic reforms. His regime was given the moniker "duvalierism without Duvalier".

Namphy, who enjoyed a reputation for being honest and apolitical, had trouble in his early weeks in power; Haitians ceased their celebrations over the departure of Duvalier and started rioting and looting. In March 1986, as violence swept the capital, Port-au-Prince, the popular justice minister resigned from the ruling council and Namphy dismissed three other members who had close ties with the Duvalier regime. The new council had two other members apart from Namphy. The council had difficulty in exerting its authority because of frequent strikes and demonstrations.

An election held in October for a constituent assembly to prepare a draft constitution reflected a lack of public interest in determining the country's political future. The first attempt at elections, in November 1987, ended when some three dozen voters were massacred. In January 1988 Leslie Manigat won an election that was widely considered fraudulent, and Namphy overthrew him on 20 June in the June 1988 Haitian coup d'état after Manigat had dismissed Namphy as army commander, after Namphy had made moves that Manigat did not approve of. Namphy remained in power until 17 September 1988, when he was deposed by a group of young officers organized by General Prosper Avril.

He died from lung cancer on 26 June 2018 in the Dominican Republic, after 30 years in exile. He told his family that he wanted to be buried in the Dominican Republic. In his testament, he bequeathed his personal library to the Fundación Global Democracia y Desarrollo foundation.

Namphy was tetralingual (he spoke Haitian Creole, French, Spanish and English). He had married twice and had two daughters, one based in Martinique and the other in the Dominican Republic.

Political offices
Preceded by Leslie Manigat	President of Haiti; 1988	Succeeded by Prosper Avril
