= Leslie Manigat =

President of Haiti (1930–2014)

Leslie François Manigat
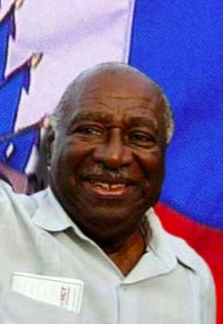

37th President of Haiti
- In office February 7, 1988 – June 20, 1988
- Prime Minister: Martial Célestin
- Preceded by: Henri Namphy
- Succeeded by: Henri Namphy

Personal details
- Born: Leslie François Saint Roc Manigat; August 16, 1930 Port-au-Prince, Haiti
- Died: June 27, 2014 (aged 83) Port-au-Prince, Haiti
- Party: Progressive National Democrat
- Spouse(s): 1) Marie-Lucie Chancy; 2) Mirlande Hyppolite (1970–2014; his death)
- Profession: Professor

Leslie François Saint Roc Manigat (French pronunciation: [lɛsli fʁɑ̃swa sɛ̃ ʁɔk maniɡa]; August 16, 1930 – June 27, 2014) was a Haitian politician who was elected as President of Haiti in a tightly controlled military held election in January 1988. He served as President for only a few months, from February 1988 to June 1988, before being ousted by the military in a coup d'état.

== In education ==
Leslie Manigat was a professor at the prestigious l'Université de Paris-VIII Vincennes, where he gave courses on World History. He also published articles on education in various Haitian newspapers: Le Nouvelliste, La Phalange, and Le Matin.

== 1988 Haitian presidential elections ==
According to the Provisional Electoral Council (Conseil Electoral Provisoire, or CEP) he won the presidential election of January 17, 1988 with 50.29% of the votes, defeating ten other candidates. However, voter turnout was well under 10%. Few historians and vote monitors consider this election to have been democratic. He was inaugurated on February 7, 1988, and named Martial Célestin as his Prime Minister in March. He was overthrown by general Henri Namphy on June 20, 1988, in the June 1988 Haitian coup d'état. He ran for president again in the February 2006 election but was defeated, receiving 12.40% of the vote and placing a distant second behind René Préval.

== Death ==
He died on June 27, 2014, at the age of 83.

== Family ==
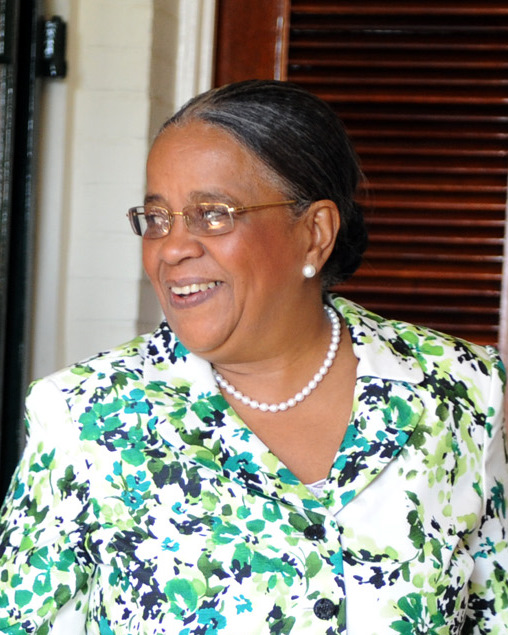
Mirlande Manigat

Manigat was born in Port-au-Prince. His second wife, Mirlande Manigat, whom he married in 1970, was a candidate in the 2010 presidential election.

== Award ==
Leslie Manigat won The Haiti Grand Prize of literature 2004, given at the Miami Book Fair International of 2004. Nominees for the Prize were: Edwidge Danticat, René Depestre, Jean-Claude Fignolé, Odette Roy Fombrun, Frankétienne, Gary Klang, Dany Laferrière and Josaphat-Robert Large.

== Selected works ==
- Une date littéraire, un événement pédagogique - Essay, Port-au-Prince, 1962
- L'Amérique latine au XXe Siècle - History, Université de Paris I Sorbonne, 1973

== Sources ==
Political offices
Preceded by Henri Namphy	President of Haïti; 1988	Succeeded by Henri Namphy
