= Cuba–Haiti relations =

- Cuba: Haiti

Cuba–Haiti relations refer to the bilateral relations between Cuba and Haiti. Cuba has an embassy in Port-au-Prince and Haiti has an embassy in Havana. Spanish is the principal language of Cuba while Haiti spoke French and Haitian Creole primarily, as Cuba and Haiti have a significant African heritage as well as a religion like Haitian Vodou and Santería. Both islands experienced a massive influx of enslaved Africans during the French and Spanish colonial era, contributing significantly to their demographics.

== History ==
Both flags such as "Cuba" used by Fulgencio Batista and "Haiti" used by the Duvalier family including Papa Doc and Baby Doc Duvalier who ruled as authoritarian dictators.

In 1492, Christopher Columbus had landed on the Cuban shores of Holguín which declared as "the most beautiful land human eyes had ever seen". Columbus had also landed on the island of Hispaniola (present-day Haiti) on his first voyage to the Americas, establishing a settlement called "La Navidad" near the coastal city of Cap-Haïtien which became the first European colony established in the New World during the Age of Exploration as the Spanish began to create permanent settlements on Cuba and Hispaniola. While Cuba remained Spanish control, the Western third of Hispaniola was ceded to France of what will become known as the new French colony of Saint-Domingue, which imported thousands of African slaves from their homelands and bought them into the Americas to work on sugar plantations with coffee, cotton, tobacco and rum for Europe. The British siege of Havana had decided to attack the Spanish fortress as well as the naval base and would remain under British control until 1763 during the Seven Years' War against the French that happened at the Battle of Cap-Français. In 1791, with the French Revolution commenced that affected Toussaint Louverture, Jean-Jacques Dessalines and Henri Christophe along with their black soldiers, the Haitian Revolution had begun starting in Bois Caïman led by Boukman Dutty with the practice of Voodoo to declare war on not with the French, but with the whites that caused a massive slave revolt. In Cuba, several thousand French and Haitian-born French citizens sought refugee to escape the war and genocide of which 20,000 French, creoles and former slaves immigrated from Saint-Domingue to Cuba. In 1803, following Toussaint's death in Fort de Joux in France by Napoleon's forces, Dessalines had manage to defeat the French for once more with a famous Haitian victory at the Battle of Vertières. On 1 January 1804, Saint-Domingue finally achieved independence from France and renamed the country as Ayiti meaning "Land of High Mountains", Haiti became the world's first and oldest black-led republic in the world, the first country in the Caribbean, the first in the Greater Antilles, the first nation to abolish slavery and the first state in Caribbean as a whole as well as the second oldest independent republic in the modern-era after the United States. Cuba's slaveholders were concerned that Haiti's independence would threaten their maritime trade and their profits from the slave trade. After the revolution in Haiti, Cuba was able to take advantage of the implosion of former Saint-Domingue's sugar industry. In 1886, slavery was finally abolished after Cuba stopped officially participating in the slave trade back in 1867 which led the Spanish Cortes passed the "Preparatory Law for the Abolition of Slavery in the Spanish Antilles". This law, also known as the vientres libres law, freed children born in 1870 or later and freed slaves who were 60 or older. Cuba had declared independence from Spain on 10 December 1898 and the United States on 20 May 1902 after the Spanish–American War concluded. The United States occupation of Haiti had lasted until the American troops had left Haiti to become independent in 1934. Haiti and Cuba have both been ruled by dictators, including François Duvalier (Papa Doc) of the Duvalier government in Haiti and Fulgencio Batista (El Hombre) became "El Presidente" in Cuba. The United States supported these dictatorships at different times, in part to counter the spread of communism. Batista's fascist government was sabotaged by Fidel Castro and the 26th of July Movement as they entered and captured the capital on New Year's Day 1959 which marked the Triumph of the Revolution. In 1959, Cuba and Haiti broke diplomatic relations during the dictatorship of François Duvalier. Duvalier broke off relations first after the United States urged member-states of the Organisation of American States to cut ties with Cuba after the Cuban Revolution. In 1964, Duvalier had won the constitutional referendum and named himself as "President for Life of Haiti". In 1977, despite having no official diplomatic ties, the Caribbean Nations signed Cuba–Haiti Maritime Boundary Agreement setting the official maritime border in the Windward Passage between Jean-Claude Duvalier (Baby Doc) and Fidel Castro. Following the overthrow of the Duvalier regime on 7 February 1986, like Batista's overthrow in Cuba back in 1959 that became swift and decisive, Jean-Bertrand Aristide and Fidel Castro agreed to reestablish relations in 1997 and later that year, a Cuban Embassy opened up in Port-au-Prince. Haiti maintains a vital diplomatic presence in Cuba, primarily through its embassy located in Havana.

== Aid and development ==
Since Hurricane Georges, Cuba has sent medical aid to Haiti in the form of doctors, education and medical supplies. Over 3,000 doctors have been sent to Haiti since 1998 and have educated 550 Haitians at Medical School in Havana with 567 Haitians studying at ELAM as of 2010. From 1998 to 2010, Cuba performed over 207,000 surgeries, restored eyesight to 45,000, 14.6 million patient-doctor consultations, taught 100,000 how to read and helped in the birth of 100,000 children. In the aftermath of the 2010 Haiti Earthquake, Cuba was among the first responders sending medical teams seeing hundreds of thousands of patients, and performing over 70,000 surgeries. There has been documented change in infant mortality and life expectancy in Haiti due to Cuba's medical aid.

== Haitians in Cuba ==
Haitian Cubans number 300,000 in Cuba, with Haitian Creole being the second most spoken language in the country. Many have arrived in recent years due to natural disasters in Haiti such as the 2010 Haiti Earthquake.
