= 1984 Haitian parliamentary election =

← 1979	12 February 1984	1986 →

All 59 seats in the Chamber of Deputies 30 seats needed for a majority
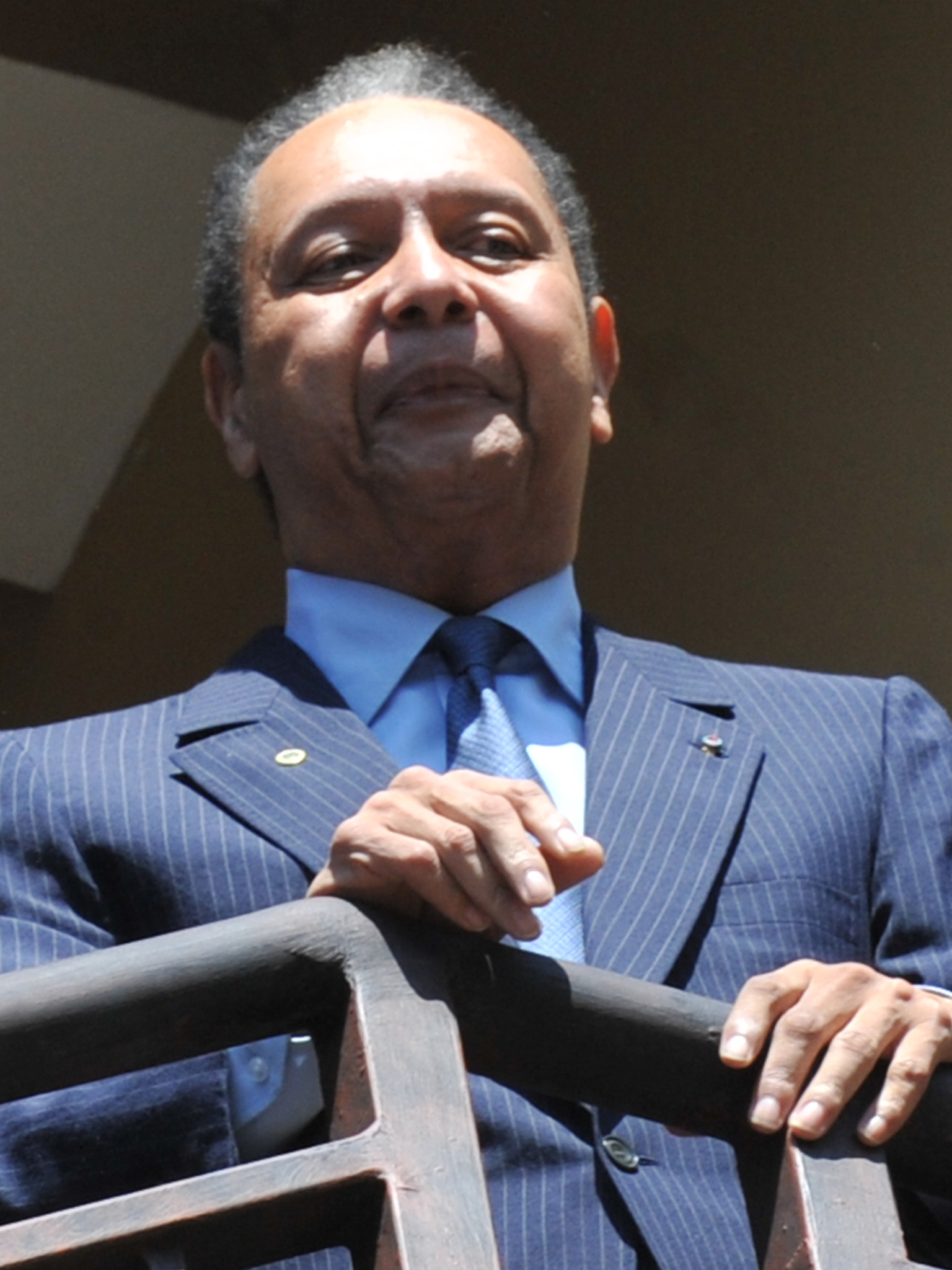
	First party
Leader	Jean-Claude Duvalier
Party	PUN
Last election	57
Seats won	59
Seat change	▲2

Parliamentary elections were held in Haiti on 12 February 1984. All but one of the candidates were members of the National Unity Party (PUN) of President Jean-Claude Duvalier. The PUN subsequently won all 59 seats.

== Results ==
Party	Seats
National Unity Party	59
Independents	0
Total	59
Source: Nohlen
