= Luckner Cambronne =

Duvalier-era Haitian state-terrorist (1930–2006)

Luckner James Cambronne (30 October 1930 – 24 September 2006) was a high-ranking political figure in François Duvalier's regime in Haiti.

== Biography ==
Cambronne was born the son of a poor preacher and had a career as a bank teller. His alliance with François Duvalier, the Haitian politician who became President of Haiti, led to Cambronne's rising to the number two position in power.

In his political career, Cambronne started out as a messenger for Duvalier. After developing a reputation for enforcement and cruelty, he quickly rose in his administration. He served two terms in Parliament, being elected in 1961 and 1967, and was appointed Minister of the Interior (1963) and of National Defense (1971) under Duvalier.

Cambronne became Duvalier's second in command and head of his fearsome private militia, popularly known as the Tonton Macoutes. Cambronne's reign was characterized by extensive embezzlement: the use of public funds for his personal businesses and enterprises. As head of the Tonton Macoutes, Cambronne led a campaign of state terrorism against all opposition, having opponents threatened, attacked, murdered and "disappeared".

He was known as the "Vampire of the Caribbean" for his profiting from the sale of Haitian blood and cadavers to the West for medical uses. Critics accused his forces of picking people to murder to provide bodies for such shipments.

Cambronne was co-owner of Hemo-Caribbean, a plasma center in Port-au-Prince that operated from 1971 to 1972, and which had poor hygiene standards. A 1972 New York Times story reported that Hemo-Caribbean exported 5,000–6,000 litres of plasma to the United States a month. Without appropriate preventive action, diseases can easily be transferred from one donor to another through the reuse of blood tubing. The book The Origin of AIDS by Jacques Pépin argues that Hemo-Caribbean was a major "amplifier" of the HIV/AIDS crisis, which he says had likely crossed over from Africa to Haiti through a single carrier around 1966.

After the death of François Duvalier in 1971, Cambronne was said to be interested in becoming Prime Minister under his son and successor, Jean-Claude Duvalier. Jean-Claude's mother, Simone Duvalier, outmaneuvered Cambronne and insisted on his exile. He was replaced by Roger Lafontant as leader of the Tonton Macoutes and Minister.

Cambronne moved to Miami, Florida, US in 1972. He died there in exile on 24 September 2006. With his wife, Ina, he had seven children.

== Cultural references ==
- A character loosely based on Cambronne, named Captain Dargent Peytraud, appears in the cult horror film The Serpent and the Rainbow. The Peytraud character is additionally depicted as a bokor (priest) in Haitian Vodou.
