= Duvalier =

Duvalier is a French surname, and may refer to:

- François Duvalier (1907–1971), nicknamed "Papa Doc", President of Haiti 1957–71
- Jean-Claude Duvalier (1951–2014), nicknamed "Baby Doc", son of François Duvalier and President of Haiti 1971–86
- Simone Ovid Duvalier (1913–1997), nicknamed "Mama Doc", widow of François Duvalier and mother of Jean-Claude Duvalier
- Michèle Bennett Duvalier (b. 1950), former wife of Jean-Claude Duvalier 1980–90
