= Constitution of Haiti =

Constitution of 2012

The Constitution of Haiti (French: Constitution d'Haïti, Haitian Creole: Konstitisyon Ayiti) is the supreme law of the Republic of Haiti. It was modeled after the constitutions of the United States, Poland and France. The latest version of the document was approved by Parliament in March 2011 and came into effect on June 20, 2012.

== History ==
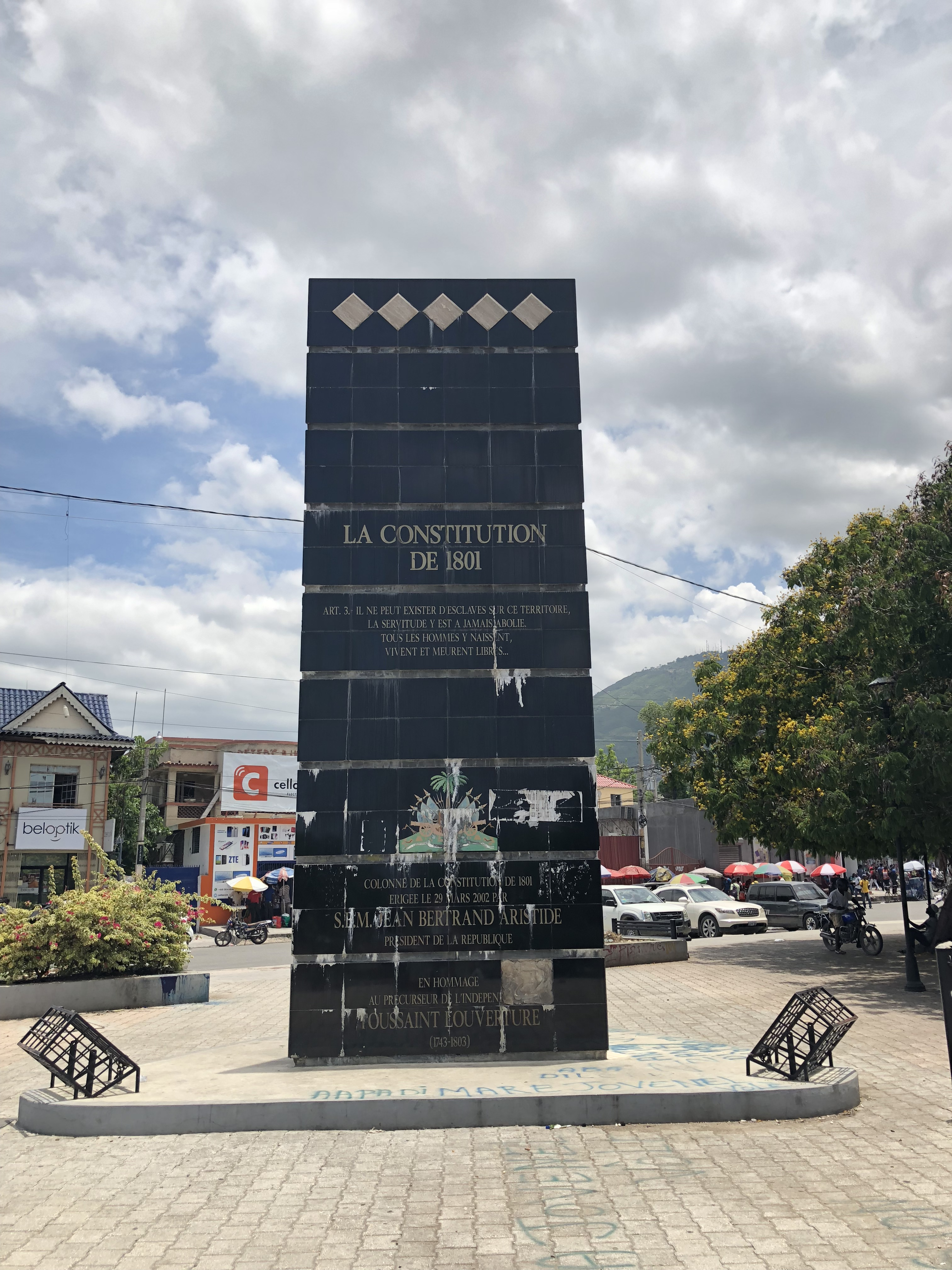
Constitution Monument in the Haitian capital Port-au-Prince

A total of 22 constitutions have been promulgated throughout Haiti's history, before the first constitution, a colonial constitution was promulgated under the short-lived government of then-Governor-General in 1801 Toussaint Louverture, who had become one of the leaders of the revolutionary forces in the Haitian Revolution.

- First Constitution of Hayti as a free country promulgated by Jacques I.
- Constitution of 1806, for the southern Republic of Haiti, written largely by Alexandre Pétion.
- Constitution of 1807 formalized a northern State of Haiti with Christophe as its President for Life and a small appointed Council of State, composed primarily of generals. Banned divorce and public exercise of any religion other than Catholicism, and suspended operation of the constitution at any location attended by the army. Unusual in its omission of any prohibition against white ownership of land.
- Constitution of 1811 for the northern State of Haiti, establishing a hereditary monarchy under Christophe. Again, prohibition against white ownership of land was omitted.
- Revision of the Haitian Constitution of 1806 (1816). Created a bicameral legislature of a House of Representatives ("composed of Three Members for the Capital of the Republic, of Two for the Capital of each Department, and of One Member for each Commune") and a Senate, established Pétion as President for Life, restricted the legislature to only consider bills proposed by the president, and provided for laws by presidential order, except for taxation. The Senate was no longer directly elected, but selected by the lower house from a list of nominees provided by the president. This constitution also provided automatic Haitian citizenship to any black, Indian, or person of mixed race who resided in the nation for more than a year.
- Constitution of 1843 under Charles Rivière-Hérard.
- Constitution of 1816 restored by Jean-Baptiste Riché.
- Constitution of 1846, under Jean-Baptiste Riché.
- Constitution of 1849. Re-established Haïti as an empire under Faustin I.
- Constitution of 1874 under Michel Domingue. Granted the executive had the power to dissolve the Chambers and to establish a Council of State to aid the Government. Power was given to the president for one year to change the judges and magistrates.
- Constitution of 1867
- Constitution of 1874
- Constitution of 1879
- Constitution of 1888
- Constitution of 1889
- Constitution of 1902
- Constitution of 1918, acclaimed by U.S.-backed plebiscite: 98,225 for, 769 against. Restored direct elections by universal male suffrage for the Senate. Revised in 1927-1928.
- Constitution of 1932
- Constitution of 1935. Anti-democratic. Allowed Sténio Vincent broad powers, including the ability to succeed himself.
- Constitution of 1932 reinstated (1942.)
- Constitution of 1946, Nov. 22. Constitution of Dumarsais Estime. Heinl, p. 552.
- Constitution of 1950. Enfranchised women. Established direct elections for President.
- Constitution of 1957.
- Constitution of 1964. Established François Duvalier as President for Life. Established a unicameral Legislature of 58 deputies.
- Constitution of 1983
- Constitution of 1987. Banned dual citizenship, effectively restricting Haitian-Americans (such as Samir Mourra and Dumarsais Simeus) from running for president in Haiti. Was ratified in March 1987, but it was completely suspended from June 1988 to March 1989 and was only fully reinstated in October 1994.
- Constitution of 2012. Currently in force. Re-legalizes dual citizenship, run for Haitian political office (except for offices of president, prime minister, senator or member of the lower house of Parliament). Also demands the establishment of a permanent constitutional court to resolve disputes between Parliament and the executive, a new permanent electoral council to replace the provisional CEP, and that 30 percent of government jobs be held by women.

== See also ==
- Haitian constitutional referendums: 1918, 1928, 1935, 1939, 1964, 1971, 1985, 1987
- 2021–25 Haitian constitutional referendum attempt
