= Ministry of Interior and Territorial Communities (Haiti) =

Government minister of Haiti

- Coat of arms of Haiti

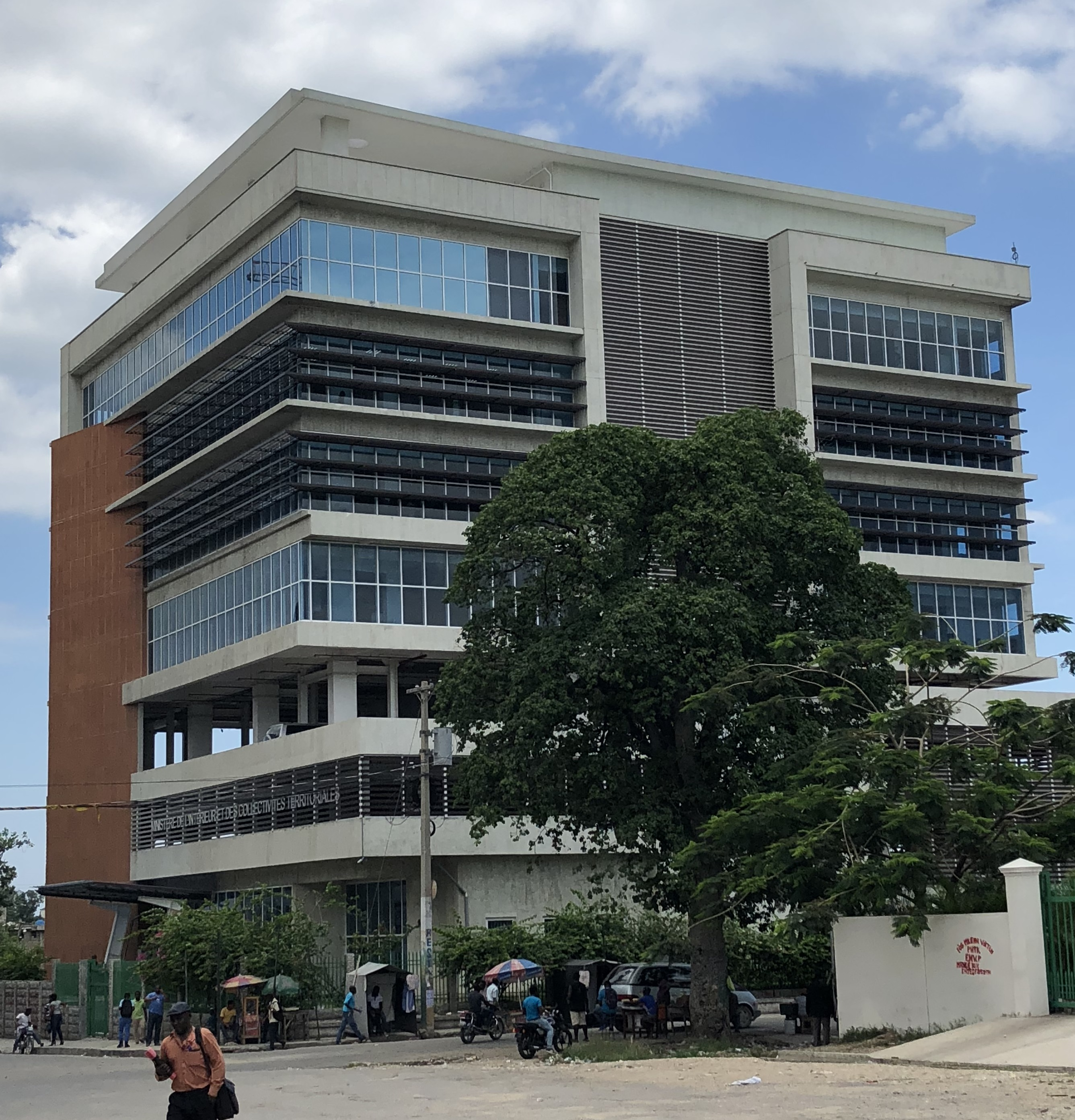

Agency overview
- Jurisdiction: Government of Haiti
- Minister responsible: Paul Antoine Bien-Aimé
- Child agency: The Directorate for Civil Protection
- Website: http://www.mict.gouv.ht/

The Ministry of Interior and Territorial Communities (French: ministère de l'Intérieur et des Collectivités territoriales, MICT) is a ministry of the Government of Haiti. An interior ministry, it is mainly responsible for the maintenance of internal security and domestic policy. In addition, the ministry is part of the Prime Minister's Cabinet.

== List of ministers ==
This page lists Interior Ministers of Haiti since 1932.

- 1932–1934: Elie Lescot
- 1934–1936: Joseph Titus
- 1936–1937: Frédéric Duvigneau
- 1937–1940 : Christian Lanoue
- 1940: Amilcar Duval
- 1940–1941: Alfred Nemours
- 1941: Jean-Chrisostome Lélio-Joseph
- 1941–1946: Vély Thébaud
- 1946: Paul Magloire
- 1946–1948: Georges Honorat
- 1948–1950: Louis Raymond
- 1950: Castel Démesmin
- 1950: Paul Magloire
- 1950: Luc Fouché
- 1950–1952: Arsène Magloire
- 1952–1953: Paracelse Pélissier
- 1953–1954: Ducasse Jumelle
- 1954–1955: Luc Prophète
- 1955–1956: Adelphin Telson
- 1956: Alphonse Racine
- 1956–1957: Rodolphe Barau
- 1957: Thézalus Pierre-Etienne
- 1957: Léonce Bernard
- 1957: Gaston Georges
- 1957–1959: Frédéric Duvigneau
- 1959: Jean A. Magloire
- 1959–1961: Aurèle Joseph
- 1961–1962: Boileau Méhu
- 1962–1964: Luc D. François
- 1964–1967: Jean M. Julmé
- 1967: Morille Figaro
- 1967–1971: Aurèle Joseph
- 1971–1972: Luckner Cambronne
- 1972–1973: Roger Lafontant
- 1973–1974: Breton Nazaire
- 1974–1976: Paul Blanchet
- 1976–1977: Pierre Biamby
- 1977–1978: Aurélien Jeanty
- 1978–1979: Achille Salvant
- 1979: Bertholand Edouard
- 1979–1980: Claude Raymond
- 1980–1981: Frantz Médard
- 1981–1982: Edouard Berrouet
- 1982: Joseph Alexis Guerrier
- 1982–1985: Roger Lafontant
- 1985: François Guillaume
- 1985: Jean-Marie Chanoine
- 1985–1986: Pierre Merceron
- 1986–1988: Williams Régala
- 1988: Yves Auguste
- 1988: Williams Régala
- 1988–1989: Carl Dorsainville
- 1989: Acédius Saint-Louis
- 1989–1990: Fritz Romulus
- 1990–1991: Joseph Maxi
- 1991: René Préval
- 1991–1992: Gracia Jean
- 1992: Serge M. Charles
- 1992–1993: Carl-Michel Nicholas
- 1993–1994: René Prosper
- 1994: Willio Noailles
- 1994: Carl-Michel Nicholas
- 1994–1995: René Prosper
- 1995: Mondésir Beaubrun
- 1995–1996: Wilthan Lhérisson
- 1996–1999: Jean-Joseph Molière
- 1999–2001: Jacques-Édouard Alexis
- 2001–2002: Henri-Claude Ménard
- 2002–2004: Jocelerme Privert
- 2004–2005: Hérard Abraham
- 2005: Georges Moïse
- 2005–2006: Gustave Magloire
- 2006–2011: Paul Antoine Bien-Aimé
- 2011–2012: Thierry Mayard-Paul
- 2012–2013: Ronsard Saint-Cyr
- 2013–2014: David Bazile
- 2014–2015: Réginald Delva
- 2015: Ariel Henry
- 2015–2016: Ardouin Zéphirin
- 2016: Pierrot Delienne (acting)
- 2016–2017: François Anick Joseph
- 2017–2018: Max Rudolph Saint-Albin
- 2018–2019: Jean-Marie Reynaldo Brunet
- 2019–2020: Pierre Josué Agénor Cadet (acting)
- 2020–2021: Audain Fils Bernadel
- 2021: Louis Gonzague Edner Day
- 2021–2022: Liszt Quitel
- 2022–2024: Ariel Henry (acting)
- 2024: Garry Conille
- 2024-present: Paul Antoine Bien-Aimé

== See also ==
- Haiti
  - List of heads of state of Haiti
  - Prime Minister of Haiti
  - List of colonial governors of Saint-Domingue
