= Fort Dimanche =

Monument and prison in Port-au-Prince, Haiti

Coordinates: 18.569°N 72.345°W

Fort Dimanche is a fortress and former prison in Haiti located near La Saline in Port-au-Prince that was notorious for torture and murder during the reign of François Duvalier. It was declared a monument in 1987.

The original Fort Dimanche was built by the French when Haiti was a colony prior to 1804 and fell into disrepair. It became a military facility built by the US Marines in the 1920s during the American occupation of Haiti. Already prior to Duvalier it may have been used for the handling of political prisoners. During the reign of Duvalier he and his Tonton Macoutes used the facility as an interrogation center and prison to incarcerate, torture, and murder political opponents. Also people who tried to escape from the island and were caught were brought to Fort Dimanche. His son, Jean-Claude Duvalier, continued to use it as an instrument of terror.

Crammed into tiny cells, three by three by four feet, inmates slept in shifts in their own filth. Gruel as food was placed on the floor, water was given out infrequently, in addition, inmates drank some of the water when they were hosed down once a week. Dead bodies were often not removed for days and then dumped into mass graves outside the prison. Prisoners died from torture, dehydration, malnutrition, and infections. Most did not survive. It has been estimated that about 3,000 inmates died.

When Lieut. Gen. Raoul Cédras led a military coup against Jean-Bertrand Aristide in September 1991, Fort Dimanche was turned temporarily into an armory.

== See also ==
- Madame Max Adolphe

== Books ==
- Lemoine, Patrick, Fort-Dimanche, Dungeon of Death (October 1977)
