= National Unity Party (Haiti) =

Haitian political party

National Unity Party Parti de l'unité nationale
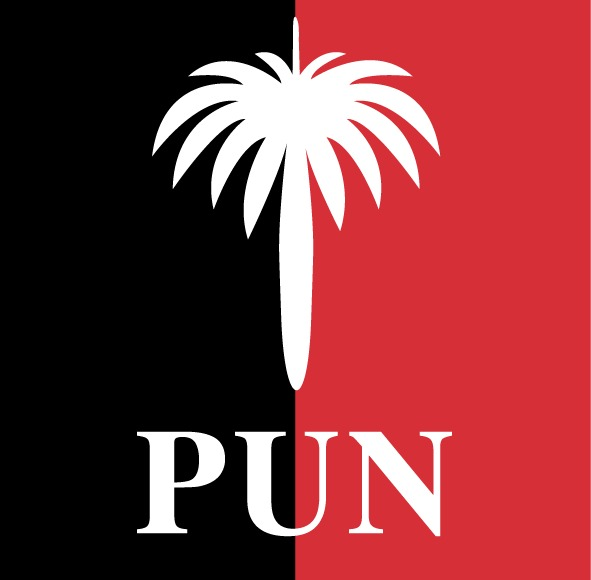
- Abbreviation: PUN
- Leader: François Duvalier (1957–1971); Jean-Claude Duvalier (1971–1986)
- Founder: François Duvalier
- Founded: 14 June 1957 22 April 2014 (Reconstituted)
- Dissolved: 7 February 1986
- Headquarters: Port-au-Prince, Ouest department
- Paramilitary wing: Tonton Macoute (1959–1986)
- Ideology: Black nationalism Haitian nationalism Totalitarianism; Anti-communism; Right-wing populism Historical: Anti-Americanism (until 1971)
- Political position: Far-right
- Colors: Black; Red; White
- Chamber of Deputies: 0 / 119
- Senate: 0 / 30

Party flag

The National Unity Party (French: Parti de l'unité nationale, PUN) is a far-right political party in Haiti. It was the de facto sole legal political party under the Duvalier family (French: Dynastie des Duvalier), the autocratic family dictatorship of François "Papa Doc" Duvalier and his son Jean-Claude "Baby Doc" Duvalier, which lasted from 1957 to 1986.

== History ==
The PUN was founded in 1957 as a political platform to support the presidential candidacy of "Papa Doc" Duvalier in the 1957 general election. In the aftermath of the July 1958 coup attempt, the Tonton Macoute — officially named Volunteers of the National Security (French: Volontaires de la Sécurité Nationale, VSN) — was formed as the paramilitary wing of the PUN. In 1963, other political parties in Haiti were outlawed, making the PUN the single political party of the nation.

When "Papa Doc" Duvalier died in 1971, his son "Baby Doc" Duvalier succeeded him as the President of the country and the leader of the party. The party would remain in power until the fall and exile of "Baby Doc" Duvalier in 1986, at the height of the Anti-Duvalier protest movement, after which the party would enter a low profile stage, including the change of its name to National Progressive Party (French: Parti progressiste national, PPN).

After the return of "Baby Doc" Duvalier from exile in 2011, the party began a process of reconstitution under its original name from 2014, and started opening departmental offices. Suffering a setback with the death of "Baby Doc" Duvalier in 2014, the party nominated Marc-Arthur Drouillard as its candidate in the 2015 presidential election. Towards that time, the legal representative of the party was Philomène Exe.

== Electoral history ==
=== Presidential elections ===
Election	Party candidate	Votes	%	Result
1957	François Duvalier	680,509	72,36%	Elected ✓
1961 (referendum)	François Duvalier	1,320,748	100%	Elected ✓
1964 (referendum)	François Duvalier	2,800,000	99,88%	Elected ✓
1971 (referendum)	Jean-Claude Duvalier	2,239,917	100%	Elected ✓
1985 (referendum)	Jean-Claude Duvalier	2,375,011	99,98%	Elected ✓
2015	Marc-Arthur Drouillard	929	0,06%	Lost ✗
2016	Marc-Arthur Drouillard	970	0,09%	Lost ✗

=== Chamber of Deputies elections ===
Election	Party leader	Seats	+/–	Position	Result
1957	François Duvalier	35 / 37	New	1st	Supermajority government
1961	François Duvalier	67 / 67	▲32	1st	Supermajority government
1964	François Duvalier	Unknown		1st	Sole legal party
1967	François Duvalier	Unknown		1st	Sole legal party
1973	Jean-Claude Duvalier	58 / 58		1st	Sole legal party
1979	Jean-Claude Duvalier	57 / 58	▼1	1st	Sole legal party
1984	Jean-Claude Duvalier	59 / 59	▲2	1st	Sole legal party

== See also ==
- Dominican Party, the ruling party of the neighboring Dominican Republic under Rafael Trujillo between 1930–1961.
