= Aviole Paul-Blanc =

Haitian politician

Member of Parliament
- In office 1961–
- Constituency: Hinche 1

Aviole Paul-Blanc, also known as Madame Ulrick Paul-Blanc, was a Haitian politician. She and Madame Max Adolphe were elected to Parliament in 1961, becoming the first female parliamentarians in Haiti.

== Biography ==
Paul-Blanc was a candidate of National Unity Party in the first constituency of Hinche in the 1961 parliamentary elections. With the PUN being the only party to contest the election, she was returned unopposed to Parliament, becoming one of the first two female MPs alongside Madame Max Adolphe.

In 1975 she was arrested and jailed after a shipment of illegal arms in her name was uncovered. Her husband was also jailed and died in prison in July 1976. She was released in December 1976 as part of a Christmas amnesty.
