= Ecumenical Center for Human Rights =

The Ecumenical Center for Human Rights (Centre Oecumenique des Droits de L'Homme) is a human rights organisation founded in Santo Domingo, Dominican Republic in 1979 to monitor the situation in Haiti under the dictatorship of Jean-Claude Duvalier. The center became a leading critic of the abject living conditions of Haitian cane cutters in the Dominican Republic, known as "Braceros". When in 1980, the center's Director was barred from Dominican Republic, its activities were transferred to San Juan, Puerto Rico. From 1986 onwards it has been based in Port-au-Prince, Haiti.

The Director, Jean-Claude Bajeux, was forced to flee because of his anti-government activities in 1993, but went back to Haiti following the return of Jean-Bertrand Aristide.

The organization is one of the founding members of the Caribbean Human Rights Network.
