= 1973 Haitian parliamentary election =

- 11 February 1973

All 58 seats in the Chamber of Deputies 30 seats needed for a majority
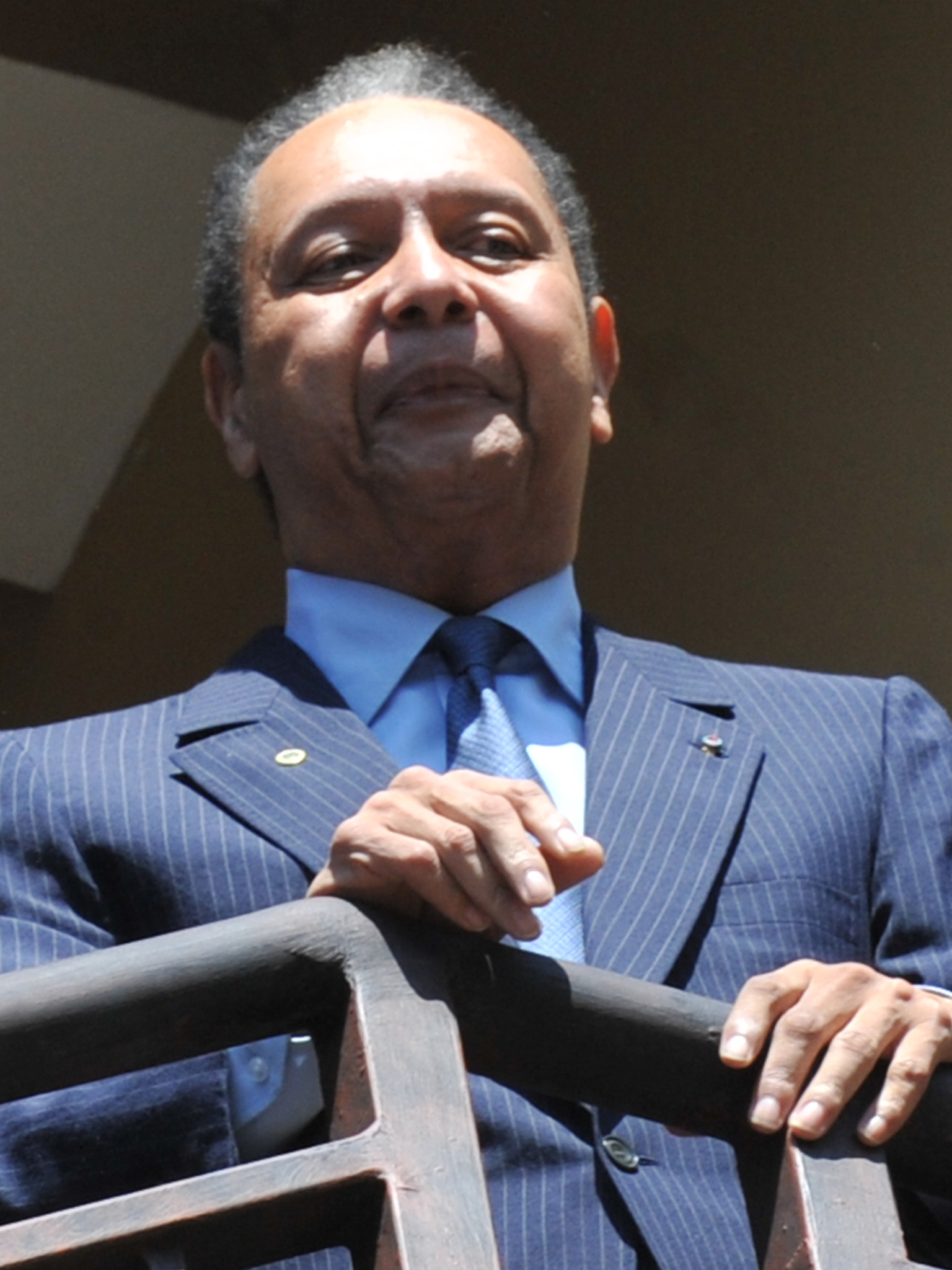
	First party
Leader	Jean-Claude Duvalier
Party	PUN
Seats won	58
Percentage	100%

Parliamentary elections were held in Haiti on 11 February 1973. Over 300 candidates contested the election, all of whom were members of the National Unity Party and supporters of President Jean-Claude Duvalier.

== Results ==
Party	Seats
National Unity Party	58
Total	58
Source: IPU
