= Anti-Duvalier protest movement =

Movement to overthrow Jean-Claude Duvalier

- Part of the History of Haiti
- Date: 23 May 1984 – 7 February 1986
- Location: Haiti
- Result: Opposition victory: Fall of the Duvalier family

Parties
(Haiti) Haitian opposition	Duvalier family

Lead figures
(Haiti) Sylvio Claude (Haiti) Grégoire Eugène	(Duvalier family) Jean-Claude Duvalier

The Anti-Duvalier protest movement was a series of demonstrations in Haiti from 23 May 1984 to 7 February 1986 that led to the overthrow of President Jean-Claude Duvalier and the Duvalier family regime and the readoption of the original flag and coat of arms of the country.

The protests were sparked by economic hardship, and widespread human rights abuses, the protests marked a significant turning point in Haitian political history. Duvalier fled into exile on 7 February 1986, ending nearly three decades of dynastic rule by the Duvalier family and paving the way for a new transitional government.

== History ==
The flag of Haiti from 1964 to 1986, used by the Duvalier dynasty

François Duvalier was elected to presidency in the 1957 Haitian general election, and he declared himself "President for life" following the 1964 Haitian constitutional referendum. In the aftermath of the July 1958 Haitian coup d'état attempt, to keep the populace subservient, Duvaller created a paramilitary force called the Tonton Macoutes (Haitian Creole: Bogeymen), notorious of its use of violence and intimidation. In 1970, the force was renamed the Militia of National Security Volunteers (French: Milice de Volontaires de la Sécurité Nationale). When Duvalier died in 1971, his son Jean-Claude Duvalier took over (confirmed by the 1971 Haitian constitutional referendum) and the force continued throughout his regime and maintained the same violent presence. Widespread problems of starvation and unemployment soon grew rampant.

On 23 May 1984, citizens in the city of Gonaïves began protests against Duvalier's government calling it "Operation Déchoukaj" (Haitian Creole: Operation Uprising), which consequently led to police officers publicly beating a pregnant woman, who soon died. Activists' listed grievances under Duvalier's regime, including general brutality against civilians and rising food costs, while some went to an aid warehouse to demand food. Law enforcement from the capital of Port-au-Prince came and quickly stopped the protests violently. The government imposed a curfew on the city. However, the protests soon spread to other cities.

The protests came after the regime had loosened some of its restrictive laws. Duvalier said that state violence in prisons would no longer be allowed, and loosened press censorship. The United States, a big source of monetary aid for Haiti, said that Duvalier should be less brutal than his father had been, and granted a large annual aid package under the condition that Haiti improve its human rights situation. Haiti was dependent on foreign aid, primarily from the United States, for 70% of its budget. Leadership in the criticism of Duvalier included Sylvio Claude, head of one opposition party, and Gregoire Eugene, the head of the other opposition party, as well as some other opposition politicians. Bishops in the predominantly Catholic nation also denounced the regime. 2,000 people signed a petition saying that the regime was enslaving the masses. The protests continued in towns and villages nationwide through November 1984.

== Referendum and opposition ==
The 1985 Haitian constitutional referendum increased Duvalier's power, angering much of the populace. In November 1985, opposition held protests in cities around the country, which led to many protesters to be arrested and killed by law enforcement. That same month, protesters held a demonstration with popular slogans and signs. The troops shot at the protesters, killing at least three students. The protests continued through December in two main towns, but did not reach the capital. Students started to boycott classes. Church radio stations, the only independent news sources, stopped broadcasting, making it very difficult for much of the country to get any information about the strikes. It seemed that some news outlets closed voluntarily, while the government closed the more outspoken ones down itself. In December 1985, increased state violence led the U.S. to threaten to cut off aid.

On 7 January, when students of most age groups returned to school from break, there were a significant number of protests. The government responded by closing schools across the country. It also responded to protests by arresting people, and forcing businessmen, civil servants, and military officials to swear loyalty to Duvalier in the palace. Nevertheless, the army threatened to turn against the regime if Duvalier failed to resolve the political crisis. Duvalier declared a nationwide day of mourning for the students murdered in November, and swore to try the police officers that had killed them. He also drove around the capital throwing money from his car window, and fired some officials, but many people declared that the efforts to improve his image had not appeased them. On 13 January 1986, opposition called for a general strike and both Catholic and Protestant church officials in the predominantly Catholic nation denounced Duvalier's rule, declaring their opposition to the injustice and oppression that the dictatorship exercised. In the capital city, protesters handed out leaflets calling for Operation Déchoukaj, to organize a general strike against the regime. Activists set up roadblocks separating Port-au-Prince from the rest of the country. Citizens continued expressing their unhappiness by painting slogans on walls, speaking more openly with international reporters, and occasional expressions of violence. The U.S. threatened to cut aid, and four senior officials stepped down from the government.

By the end of January 1986, there had been demonstrations in over a dozen towns since the murder of the students in November. Administrators from 24 schools sent an open letter to the Education Minister demanding that the schools reopen, and 111 teachers signed a similar letter. The government did not respond, although armed soldiers often watched the political processions. Campaigners set fire to a court building and threw rocks at a Duvalier's home, although it is not known whether anyone was injured. Protesters also looted hospitals and aid deports. As the end of January approached, protests increased in size, and became almost constant. Protesters took over and destroyed government offices in some outer towns, and blocked major roadways around the country. Rumors had circulated that said Duvalier had fled, but were found untrue. State violence increased, and Duvalier suspended certain civil liberties, declaring a state of siege. Stores closed and remained shut. Graffiti carrying certain popular slogans increased on walls around the capital in early February. Activists defaced a large statue of Duvalier in front of city hall. For several consecutive days in early February, Duvalier traveled around the capital as a symbol of his continuing control. Stores and businesses stayed closed, ignoring Duvalier's demand that business should proceed as usual.

== Exile ==
The original flag of Haiti was readopted in 1986 (in a modified form) after the exile of Duvalier.

On 7 February 1986, Duvalier fled to France in a United States-supplied plane; however, before leaving, he set up the six-member National Council of Government (CNG) under the leadership of Army Commander Henri Namphy to rule the country after his exile. The Duvaliers settled in France and lived comfortably, though they were denied a request of political asylum by the French authorities. Jean-Claude soon lost most of his wealth in his 1993 divorce with his wife.

A private citizen, Jacques Samyn, unsuccessfully sued to expel Duvalier as an illegal immigrant (the Duvaliers were never officially granted asylum in France). In 1998, a Haitian-born photographer, Gérald Bloncourt, formed a committee in Paris to bring Duvalier to trial. At the time, the French Ministry of the Interior said that it could not verify whether Duvalier still remained in the country due to the recently enacted Schengen Agreement which had abolished systematic border controls between the participating countries. However, Duvalier's lawyer Sauveur Vaisse said that his client was still in France and denied that the exiled leader had fallen on hard times.

The 2004 Global Transparency Report listed Duvalier as one of the World's Most Corrupt Leaders. He was listed sixth, between Slobodan Milošević and Alberto Fujimori, and was said to have amassed between $300 million to $800 million. Following the ousting of president Jean-Bertrand Aristide in February 2004, Duvalier announced his intention to return to Haiti to run for president in the 2006 elections for the National Unity Party. His remaining supporters in the country founded the François Duvalier Foundation that year to promote positive aspects of his presidency, including the creation of most of Haiti's state institutions and improved access to education for the country's black majority. However, Duvalier ultimately did not become a presidential candidate.

On 23 September 2007, Duvalier delivered an address to Haitians by radio. He said that exile had "broken" him, though what he described as the improving fortunes of the National Unity Party had "reinvigorated" him; he urged readiness among his supporters, without saying whether he intended to return to Haiti. President René Préval rejected Duvalier's apology and, on September 28, he said that while Duvalier was constitutionally free to return to Haiti, he would face trial if he did so. Duvalier's radio broadcast address was given in French and not Haitian Creole, the language spoken by the majority of Haitians.

In February 2010, a Swiss court agreed to release more than US$4 million to Jean-Claude Duvalier, although the Swiss Foreign Ministry said it would continue to block the release of the money. Duvalier lived in Paris with Véronique Roy, his longtime companion and chief public-relations representative, until his return to Haiti in late January 2011. Roy is the granddaughter of Paul Magloire, President of Haiti from 1950 to 1956.

== See also ==
- Haitian crisis (2018–present)
