= 1961 Haitian parliamentary election =

- 30 April 1961

All 67 seats in the Chamber of Deputies 34 seats needed for a majority
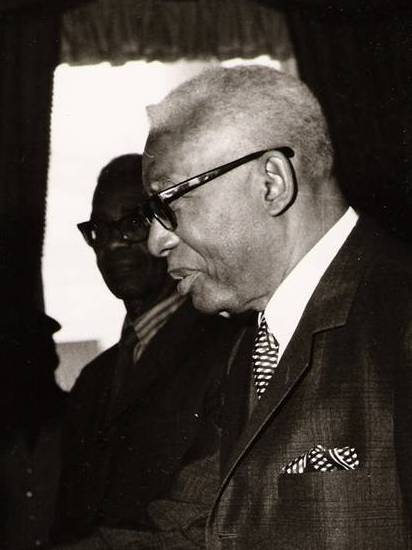
	First party
Leader	François Duvalier
Party	PUN
Seats won	67
Percentage	100%

Parliamentary elections were held in Haiti on 30 April 1961. They followed the dissolution of Parliament by President François Duvalier and the abolition of the Senate, making the Chamber of Deputies a unicameral body. Duvalier's National Unity Party won all 67 seats in the elections, which were later re-interpreted as presidential elections in order to give Duvalier a six-year presidential term and avoid the need for scheduled presidential election in 1963.

For the first time in Haitian history, two women were elected as deputies: Madame Max Adolphe and Aviole Paul-Blanc.

== Results ==
Party	Seats
National Unity Party	67
Total	67
Source: Nohlen
