= MVSN =

MVSN may refer to:

== Paramilitary organizations ==
- Milizia Volontaria per la Sicurezza Nazionale, better known as the Blackshirts, the Italian Fascist paramilitary groups
- Milice de Volontaires de la Sécurité Nationale, better known as the Tonton Macoute, a Haitian paramilitary force created in 1959

== Companies ==
- Macrovision, the former name of the software company Rovi Corporation.
