= Madame Max Adolphe =

Head of the Tonton Macoute

Madame Adolphe
- Born: Rosalie Bosquet; 10 September 1925; Mirebalais, Haiti
- Disappeared: February, 1986 (aged 60)
- Status: Missing for 40 years, 7 months and 3 days

Madame Max Adolphe (née Rosalie Bosquet, also known as Max Rosalie Auguste) (born September 10, 1925) was the right hand woman of former Haitian president François Duvalier, who used the nickname "Papa Doc". In 1961 she and Aviole Paul-Blanc were elected to Parliament, becoming the first female MPs in Haiti. She was born in Mirebalais, Haiti.

== Biography ==
Adolphe, then known as Rosalie Bosquet, came to the attention of Duvalier during an attempt on his life. While she was a low ranking officer in the Tonton Macoute, her courage impressed the president so much that he promoted her to the position of warden at Fort Dimanche. At the prison, Adolphe continued her strong support of the government and was known for her violent interrogations of political prisoners. She was not viewed as a political threat to the President because of her sex. After marrying Health Minister Max Adolphe, she assumed his full name.

Daily killings, torture, and beatings were typical at the prison during her tenure. She developed a "gruesome reputation for herself as she designed inventive sexual tortures" in Fort Dimanche. She was later promoted to the Supreme Head of the Fillettes Laleau, the female branch of the Tonton Macoutes. She also collected a monthly rent check from US Special Forces for the use of her compound. She was reported to have supervised the torture of children and elderly, and to have kept video tapes of the horrors. She liked to arm herself with an Uzi submachine gun.

== Disappearance ==
When Papa Doc died in 1971, and his son, Jean-Claude Duvalier, succeeded him, he had Adolphe removed from her post as head of Fort Dimanche. By May 1972 she had been appointed mayor of Port-au-Prince, which brought her attention to the city's sewage disposal. Prior to the end of the Duvalier dynasty in 1986, when the Duvaliers fled the capital, she said "[i]t seems Jean-Claude is leaving the country soon. All militia members will be in danger. Much blood will be shed". Vengeful Haitians killed scores, if not hundreds of former militiamen who used to report to Madame Max. On 10 February 1986 a soldier guarding her vacant house from looters reported that she was being held prisoner in an army barracks next to the national palace. By February 1986 she left the country, but her current whereabouts are unknown.

Her daughter, Magalie Racine (née Adolphe), lives in Haiti and married former Secretary of State and president of the Tèt Kale Party Georges Racine. She was Minister of Youth and Sport in 2013–14 under Prime Minister Laurent Lamothe and President Michel Martelly, known for his neo-Duvalierist sympathies.

== See also ==
- List of people who disappeared mysteriously: post-1970
