= Lafontant =

Lafontant may refer to:

- Roger Lafontant, leader of the Tonton Macoutes
- Jewel Lafontant
