= Cuba–Haiti Maritime Boundary Agreement =

1977 treaty between Cuba and Haiti

Agreement between the Republic of Haiti and the Republic of Cuba Regarding the Delimitation of Maritime Boundaries between the Two States
- Type: Boundary delimitation
- Signed: 27 October 1977
- Location: Havana, Cuba
- Effective: 6 January 1978
- Parties: Cuba; Haiti
- Depositary: United Nations Secretariat
- Languages: French; Haitian Creole; Spanish

The Cuba–Haiti Maritime Boundary Agreement is a 1977 treaty between Cuba and Haiti which delimits the maritime boundary between the two countries.

Despite no official diplomatic relations at the time between the two countries, the treaty was signed in Havana on 27 October 1977. The text of the treaty sets out a boundary that is an approximate equidistant line between the two islands in the Windward Passage. The boundary consists of 50 straight-line maritime segments defined by 51 individual coordinate points. Navassa Island, which is off the west coast of Haiti and which is claimed by Haiti and by the United States, was disregarded in calculating the approximate equidistant line of the boundary.

The treaty came into force on 6 January 1978 after it had been ratified by both countries. The full name of the treaty is Agreement between the Republic of Haiti and the Republic of Cuba Regarding the Delimitation of Maritime Boundaries between the Two States.
