= 1979 Haitian parliamentary election =

- 11 February 1979

All 58 seats in the Chamber of Deputies 30 seats needed for a majority
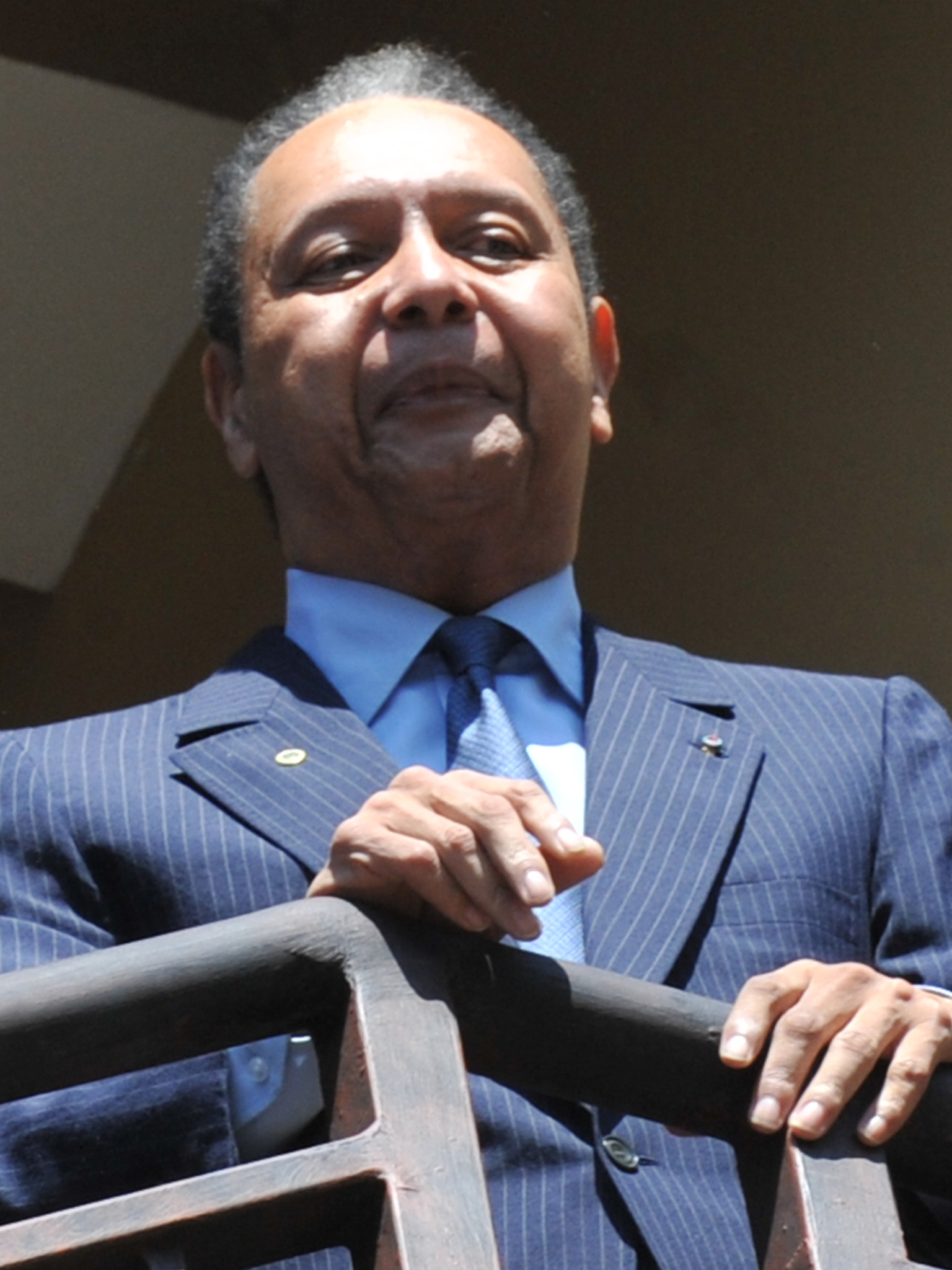
	First party
Leader	Jean-Claude Duvalier
Party	National Unity Party
Last election	58
Seats won	57
Seat change	▼1

Parliamentary elections were held in Haiti on 11 February 1979. Around 300 candidates contested the election, almost all of whom were supporters of President Jean-Claude Duvalier. All but one of the seats in the Chamber of Deputies were won by candidates of the National Unity Party (the sole legal party at the time), whilst the other was won by an independent in Cap-Haïtien.

== Results ==
Party	Seats
National Unity Party	57
Independents	1
Total	58
Source: Nohlen
