= 1918 Haitian constitutional referendum =

- 12 June 1918

Results
Choice	Votes	%
Yes	98,294	99.22%
No	769	0.78%

A constitutional referendum was held in Haiti on 12 June 1918. Voters were asked to approve or reject a new constitution, which was imposed by the United States government. It was approved by 99% of voters, although less than 5% of the population voted.

== Background ==
Haiti was occupied by the United States in 1915. Assistant Secretary of the United States Navy Franklin D. Roosevelt claimed to have drafted a new constitution, which introduced direct election of the Senate, freedom of assembly and the press, and trial by jury. Controversially it initially included a right for non-citizens to own land, and for the American military to intervene in domestic politics.

The National Assembly elected in 1917 refused to adopt the draft constitution and drafted one itself, which excluded the right of non-citizens to own land. While the Assembly was debating its draft, Major Smedley Butler interrupted the session to announce that President Philippe Sudré Dartiguenave had dissolved the legislature, after he forced Dartiguenave to sign a decree to that effect. As there was no legislature in place to adopt the document, it was decided to hold a referendum.

== Campaign ==
The American military government issued orders to arrest anyone publicly opposing adoption of the constitution.

== Results ==
Choice	Votes	%
For	98,294	99.22
Against	769	0.78
Total	99,063	100.00
Source: Nohlen
