= 1928 Haitian constitutional referendum =

A constitutional referendum was held in Haiti on 10 and 11 January 1928 during the United States occupation of Haiti. Voters were asked to approve or reject thirteen amendments to the constitution. Each amendment was voted on separately, with all approved by at least 97% of voters.

== Background ==
The thirteen proposed amendments were:

#	Article	Old text	New text
I	2	The number and boundaries of these divisions are determined by law.	The number, boundaries, organization and functioning of these divisions and subdivisions are determined by law.
II	16	Everyone has the right to express opinions in all matters, write, print and publish his thoughts. The writings can not be subjected to prior censorship. The abuse of these rights are defined and punishable under the law, but may not be deprived of freedom of the press.	Freedom of the press is guaranteed under the conditions determined by law.
III	19	The jury is established in criminal and political offences of the press	The jury is established in criminal cases to be determined by law.
IV	36	The Senate shall consist of fifteen Senators. Their duties last six years and begin the first Monday in April of even years. They are re-elected indefinitely.	The Senate shall consist of fifteen Senators. Their duties last four years and begin the first Monday in April of even years. They are re-elected indefinitely.
V	37	The Senators represent the departments, which are five in number, namely: Four Senators for the Western Department; three for each department of the North, South and Artibonite; two for the Northwest Department; Senators are elected by universal suffrage and direct primary assemblies in various departments, in conditions and a manner determined by law. The candidates who obtained the greatest number of votes in the departments are elected. At the first election after the adoption of this Constitution, the elections will be held as follows:	The Senators represent the departments. They are elected by universal suffrage and direct from primary assemblies of various departments, depending on conditions and method determined by law. The candidates who obtained the greatest number of votes in the departments are elected.
VI	72	The President of the Republic is elected for four years. He takes office on 15 May, except when elected to fill a vacancy, in which case, he is elected to the rest of time to run and he takes office immediately after his election. The President is eligible for immediate re-election. A President who was re-elected can not be re-elected for a third term until a period of four years has elapsed. A citizen who was elected president three times is no longer eligible for this function.	Subject to the reservation set out below, the President of the Republic is elected for six years. He is not eligible for immediate re-election. He takes office on 15 May, except when elected to fill a vacancy, in which case he shall take office upon election and his term ends after six years from 15 May immediately preceding his election. A citizen who has served as President is not eligible for re-election until an interval of six years from his first term. And if twice elected and having served his mandate, he is no longer eligible for this function.
VII	77	In case of vacancy of the office of President, the Council of Secretaries of State is temporarily invested as the Executive. He immediately convenes the National Assembly to elect the successor to the remainder of the presidential term. If the Legislature is in session, the National Assembly shall be convened without delay. If the Legislature is not in session, the National Assembly be convened pursuant to Article 45.	In case of vacancy of the office of President, the Council of Secretaries of State is temporarily invested as the Executive. He immediately convenes the National Assembly to elect the President of the Republic. If the Legislature is in session, the National Assembly shall be convened without delay. If the Legislature is not in session, the National Assembly be convened pursuant to Article 45.
VIII	83	Secretaries of State are five in number. They are divided between the Government departments that require the services of the State. A decree will fix this distribution according to law.	Secretaries of State are five in number. The President of the Republic may, when deemed necessary, add to them Deputy Secretaries of State whose responsibilities will be determined by law. State Secretaries and Deputy Secretaries of State are divided between the Government departments that require the services of the State. A decree will fix this distribution according to law.
IX	89	The judiciary is vested in a Supreme Court and lower courts, the mode and extent of whose jurisdiction will be established by law.	The judiciary is vested in a Supreme Court and lower courts, whose number, the organisation and jurisdiction of which shall be regulated by law. The President of the Republic appoints the Judges of all courts. He appoints and dismisses officers of the Attorney General's Office, the Court of Appeals and other courts, the magistrates and their alternates. Judges of the Court of Cessation are appointed for ten years, and those of the permanent courts other than the magistrates are appointed for seven years. These judges, once appointed, can not be subject to revocation by the Executive branch. However, the Judges remain subject to the provisions of articles 100, 101 and 102 of the constitution and the provisions of special laws determining the causes that may put an end to their functions. A Judge of Appeal who has served as judge for 25 years at least, of which at least eight as a Judge of Appeal, will be irremovable, except as provided in the preceding paragraph.
X	109	Taxes to the benefit of the state and municipalities can not be established except by law. Any communal tax can not be established without their formal consent.	Taxes to the benefit of the state and municipalities can not be established except by law.
XI	16	An armed force known as the Gendarmerie of Haiti is established to maintain order, guarantee the rights of the people and exercising the police in the cities and countryside. It is the only armed force of the Republic.	A public force, under the designations set by law, is established for the internal and external security of the Republic, guaranteeing the rights of the people, the maintenance of order and police in the cities and countryside. It is the only armed force of the Republic. Regulations relating to discipline, punishment of crimes in this organisation will be established by the Executive Branch. They will become law. These regulations establish courts martial, prescribe their powers and determine their members' obligations and rights of individuals to be judged by it. The judgments of courts martial shall not be subject to review by the Court of Cassation, and only on questions of jurisdiction and abuse of power.
XII	E	The tenure of judges is suspended by a period of six months from the promulgation of this Constitution.	Within twelve months from the implementation of these amendments, the Government is authorized to proceed with all changes it deems necessary in the current court personnel. Judges will be maintained, as new, fitted with a commission whose date will be the starting point for the duration of their duties under Article 89. To establish courts in the periodic succession of Judges, the Government is authorised, regarding first appointments, to fix shorter terms than the terms mentioned above for some judges. A law will determine in which appointments.
XIII	90, 91, 92, 93, 94, 95, 104, 105, 119	Functioning of the courts, local government and police	Deleted

== Results ==
Amendment	For		Against		Total	
Amendment	Votes	%	Votes	%	Votes	%
I	177,642	98.1	3,369	1.9	181,011	100
II	176,642	97.9	3,843	2.1	180,485	100
III	178,133	97.9	3,797	2.1	181,930	100
IV	178,370	98.2	3,287	1.8	181,657	100
V	177,879	98.5	2,738	1.5	180,617	100
VI	178,295	98.1	3,500	1.9	181,795	100
VII	181,488	98.5	2,799	1.5	184,287	100
VIII	178,419	98.2	3,321	1.8	181,740	100
IX	175,179	97.6	4,251	2.4	179,430	100
X	177,919	97.8	4,021	2.2	181,940	100
XI	177,534	97.8	4,072	2.2	181,606	100
XII	176,683	97.2	5,007	2.8	181,690	100
XIII	175,613	97.0	5,387	3.0	180,991	100
Source: Nohlen
