= 1985 Haitian constitutional referendum =

22 July 1985
- Please express your views through this Referendum on both the amendments to the existing Constitution of 1983 and on the new law regulating the functioning of political parties. The most significant of these changes include: A. A Presidency-for-Life including the right to designate a successor. B. The creation of the post of Prime Minister. C. An increase in legislative influence over the government. D. An official encouraging of the development of political pluralism. Do you agree with this new political system?

Results
Choice	Votes	%
Yes	2,375,011	99.98%
No	448	0.02%
Valid votes	2,375,459	100.00%
Invalid or blank votes	0	0.00%
Total votes	2,375,459	100.00%
Registered voters/turnout	2,600,000	91.36%

A constitutional referendum was held in Haiti on 22 July 1985. The amendments to the new constitution would restore multi-party politics, although only on the condition that all parties swore allegiance to President Jean-Claude Duvalier, as well as re-confirming Duvalier as President for Life and allowing him to single-handedly appoint the Prime Minister and his successor. The changes were reportedly approved by 99.98% of voters, although it was widely considered a sham and led to Duvalier being overthrown the following year.

== Results ==
Choice	Votes	%
For	2,375,011	99.98
Against	448	0.02
Invalid/blank votes		–
Total	2,375,459	100
Source: Direct Democracy
