= 1967 Haitian parliamentary election =

Parliamentary elections were held in Haiti on 22 January 1967. The National Unity Party of President-for-life François Duvalier was the sole legal party at the time, all other parties having been banned in 1963.
