= 1987 Haitian constitutional referendum =

Referendum that approved a new constitution

29 March 1987

Results
Choice	Votes	%
Yes	1,258,980	99.83%
No	2,167	0.17%
Valid votes	1,261,147	99.99%
Invalid or blank votes	187	0.01%
Total votes	1,261,334	100.00%

A constitutional referendum was held in Haiti on 29 March 1987. A new constitution had been drafted by a Constitutional Assembly elected the year before, and was reportedly approved by 99.8% of voters.

== Results ==
Choice	Votes	%
For	1,258,980	99.83
Against	2,167	0.17
Total	1,261,147	100.00
Valid votes	1,261,147	99.99
Invalid/blank votes	187	0.01
Total votes	1,261,334	100.00
Source: Nohlen
