= Paul Antoine Bien-Aimé =

Haitian politician

Paul Antoine Bien-Aimé is a Haitian politician and former priest who has served since November 15, 2024 as Minister of Interior and Territorial Communities in the cabinet of Acting Prime Minister Alix Didier Fils-Aimé. He previously held this position from 2006 to 2011 after he was appointed to the Cabinet by Jacques-Édouard Alexis on June 6, 2006. The appointment was approved by the Senate on the 7th and Bien-Aimé was sworn in on the 9th.

Bien-Aimé retained his post after Alexis resigned from the post of Prime Minister in 2008.
