= 1964 Haitian parliamentary election =

Parliamentary elections were held in Haiti on 14 June 1964, alongside a constitutional referendum. The National Unity Party of President François Duvalier was the sole legal party at the time, with all other parties having been banned the previous year.
