= Williams Régala =

Haitian politician (died 2018)

Williams Régala was a former member of Haiti's National Council of Government. He was a member of the short-lived first council (7 February 1986 – 20 March 1986), as well as the second council, which ruled until 7 February 1988, when Leslie Manigat took office

Régala had been the head of the secret service under Jean-Claude Duvalier, and was Interior Minister under the National Council. When Manigat took office he appointed Régala Minister of Defense.

In a 1996 report, Human Rights Watch wrote that Colonel Régala had "boasted a long history of abuse" as part of Duvalier's secret police. In 1991, under President Jean-Bertrand Aristide, a warrant for Régala's arrest was issued, the Haitian government accused Régala of having ordered the 1987 Election Day massacre. However, Régala fled the country, going to the Dominican Republic, which denied an extradition request from Haiti.

He died on 23 December 2018, at his residence, Port-au-Prince.
