= 1935 Haitian constitutional referendum =

2 June 1935

Results
Choice	Votes	%
Yes	614,217	99.95%
No	297	0.05%

A constitutional referendum was held in Haiti on 2 June 1935. The amendment would extend the term of President Sténio Vincent, and was reportedly approved by 99.95% of voters, with just 297 against.

== Results ==
Choice	Votes	%
For	614,217	99.95
Against	297	0.05
Total	614,514	100.00
Source: Nohlen
