= Duvalier family =

1957–1986 hereditary dictatorship in Haiti

The Duvalier family (French: Famille Duvalier; Haitian Creole: Fanmi Duvalier) ruled Haiti as a totalitarian hereditary dictatorship for almost 29 years, from 1957 until 1986, spanning the rule of the father-and-son duo François Duvalier ("Papa Doc") and Jean-Claude Duvalier ("Baby Doc").

== History ==
Direct elections, the first in Haiti's history, were held in October 1950, and Paul Magloire, an elite black Colonel in the military, was elected. Hurricane Hazel hit the island in 1954, devastating the nation's infrastructure and economy. Hurricane relief was inadequately distributed and misspent, and Magloire jailed opponents and shut down newspapers. After he refused to step down after his term ended, a general strike shut down Port-au-Prince's economy, and Magloire fled, leaving the government in a state of chaos. When elections were finally held in September 1957, François Duvalier, a rural doctor running under the National Unity Party banner, was elected, on a platform of activism on behalf of Haiti's poor.

=== François Duvalier ===
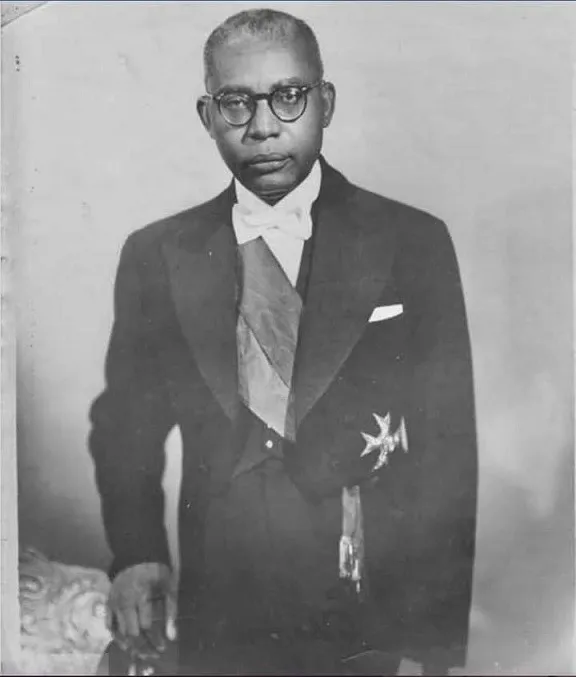
François Duvalier

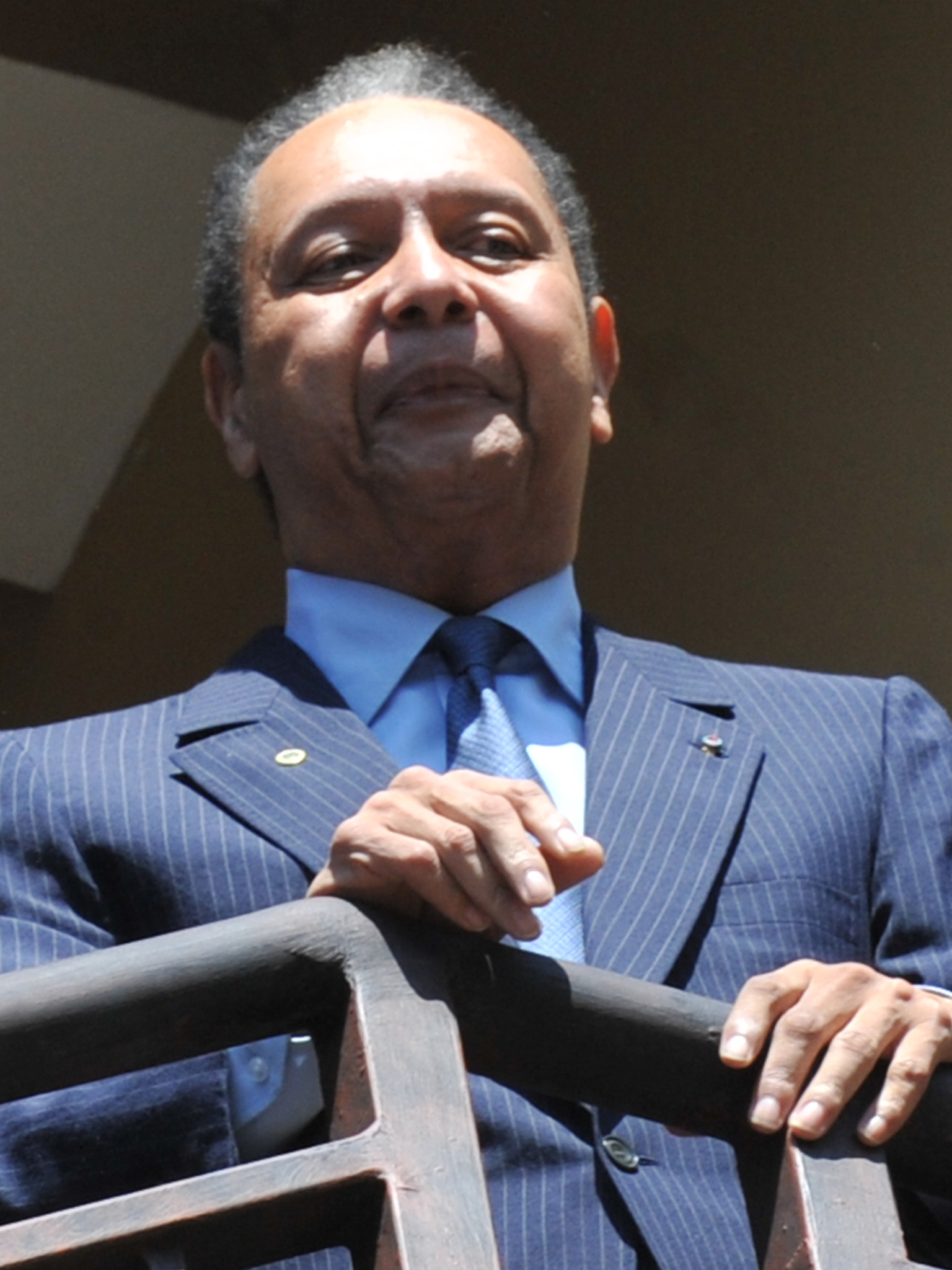
Jean-Claude Duvalier

François Duvalier (Papa Doc) produced a constitution to solidify power and replaced the bicameral legislature with a unicameral one. On 14 June 1964, following a constitutional referendum, Duvalier declared himself president for life and changed the color of the national flag and arms from red and blue to red and black. He fired the chief of the military and established a Presidential Guard to maintain his power. He also established the Volontaires de la Sécurité Nationale (National Security Volunteers), commonly referred to as the Tonton Macoute, named after a bogeyman in Haitian mythology. The Tonton Macoute became Haiti's secret police and wielded pervasive influence throughout Haiti's rural countryside. Duvalier used his newly gained influence within the military to establish his own elite. Corruption was endemic, and he stole money from government agencies and used it to reward officials who were loyal to him. Duvalier also exploited popular Vodou beliefs, creating a cult of personality surrounding himself. Owing to his extremely repressive rule, U.S. President John F. Kennedy revoked American aid to Duvalier and recalled U.S. Marine Corps missions in 1962. However, after the assassination of Kennedy, relations with Duvalier eased, partially owing to Haiti's strategic location near Cuba.

=== Jean-Claude Duvalier ===
François Duvalier died on 21 April 1971. During his rule, an estimated 30,000 citizens were killed by the government, and hundreds of thousands of Haitians emigrated to the United States, Cuba, Canada and the Dominican Republic. François was succeeded by his son, Jean-Claude (Baby Doc), as the country's new leader following a constitutional referendum. Still a teenager when he ascended to public office, Jean-Claude Duvalier was said to be reckless and dissolute, raised in elite isolation and uninterested in politics. The first few years of his administration saw him leaving administrative duties to his mother, Simone, while he lived as a playboy. He was initially well liked, because his rule was considered gentler and less formidable than that of his father. Foreign nations became more generous with economic assistance, and the United States restored its aid program to Haiti in 1971. However, endemic corruption continued to exist just as it had under his father's rule. Much of the Duvalier family's hundreds of millions of dollars in personal wealth came from the Régie du Tabac (Tobacco Administration). Originally established as a tobacco monopoly, in practice it was used as a slush fund, and few or no records were kept of its activities.

The neglect of Jean-Claude's regime, coupled with a lack of adequate infrastructure, left the nation vulnerable to health crises. The outbreak of HIV/AIDS devastated tourism in the early 1980s, and an epidemic of African swine fever devastated livestock and destroyed local farming. The USDA feared the disease's spread to North America, and it pressured Duvalier to slaughter Haiti's population of native creole pigs and replace it with animals that would be provided by international aid agencies. The Haitian government complied, but the decision caused outrage among the nation's farmers. Their pigs were well suited to the Haitian climate and environment and did not require special feed or care; the new pigs required both. In May 1980, Duvalier married Michèle Bennett, a light-skinned, mulatto divorcée. This was perceived as a betrayal of his father's legacy of supporting the black middle class, and it had an unexpected, drastically negative effect on Duvalier's popularity. The wedding's extravagant cost, which was rumored to be in excess of US$3,000,000, further alienated the black masses. A schism formed in the government between older, more conservative Duvalierists and appointees of Jean-Claude. This eventually resulted in the expulsion of Duvalier's mother, Simone, reportedly at Michèle's request.

Discontent and economic hopelessness reached a head when Pope John Paul II visited Haiti in March 1983. Declaring that "something must change here," in a speech in Port-au-Prince, the Pope called for equitable distribution of income and a more egalitarian social and political structure. Revolts broke out, revitalized by the Catholic Church, and riots also began to break out in the city of Gonaïves, with crowds attacking food distribution centers. From October 1985 to January 1986, the Anti-Duvalier protest movement spread throughout the country, to the south. A revolt began in the provinces two years later. The city of Gonaïves was the first to have street demonstrations and raids on food-distribution warehouses. The protests spread to six other cities across the country, including Cap-Haïtien. By the end of that month, Haitians in the south had revolted. The most significant rioting there broke out in Les Cayes.

Duvalier responded to riots by firing cabinet officials and cutting food prices. He also closed several independent radio stations, and deployed police units and army guards to quell the uprisings. However, these moves failed to pacify demonstrators, and in January 1986, the administration of U.S. President Ronald Reagan began to pressure Duvalier to renounce power and leave Haiti. Negotiations stalled, and while Duvalier initially accepted an offer of asylum in Jamaica, he rescinded his offer and decided to remain in Haiti. As a result, the US State Department cut back aid to Haiti, and violence in the streets spread to Port-au-Prince. On 5 February 1986, members of the military confronted the Duvalier regime and demanded his departure. With no support from the military or the legislature left, Duvalier consented, and he and his family departed by plane from Haiti to France on 7 February. He named an interim governing body, the National Governing Council (French: Conseil National de Gouvernement, CNG) which was made up of three civilians as well as two military officials. This began a shaky period of transition to full democratic rule.

== See also ==
- Empire of Haiti
- Kingdom of Haiti
- History of Haiti
- Assad family
