= Windward Passage =

Strait in the Caribbean Sea, between the islands of Cuba and Hispaniola

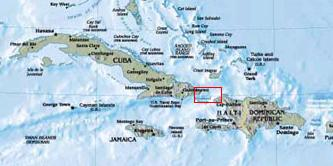
- The Windward Passage marked in red.

- Location within Haiti Location within Cuba Location within the Caribbean
- Coordinates: 20°N 74°W
- Basin countries: Cuba; Haiti
- Max. width: 80 kilometres (50 mi)
- Average depth: 1,700 metres (5,600 ft)

The Windward Passage (French: Passage au Vent; Spanish: Paso de los Vientos) is a strait in the Caribbean Sea, between the islands of Cuba and Hispaniola. The strait specifically lies between the easternmost region of Cuba and the northwest of Haiti. 80 km (50 mi) wide, the Windward Passage has a threshold depth of 1,700 m (5,600 ft).

With Navassa Island on its southern approach, it connects the Atlantic Ocean to the Caribbean Sea, and is in the direct path of shipping between the Panama Canal and the eastern seaboard of the United States. From both the eastern tip of the Guantánamo Province of Cuba and from the western tip of Haiti's Nord-Ouest Department, one can see lights on the other side of the Windward Passage.

== Territorial dispute ==
For decades, Cuba and Haiti had disputes over where the maritime boundary between the two nations was. In 1977, they settled by signing the Cuba–Haiti Maritime Boundary Agreement, which set the official boundary.

== Geology ==
The Septentrional-Oriente fault zone passes through the Windward Passage from the southern coast of Cuba to the northern coast of Hispaniola. During the Holocene the slip rate between these two islands was 9 ± 3 mm (0.35 ± 0.12 in)/year. The Septentrional Fault extends east at least to the still active Mona Rift in the Mona Passage, where extension occurs between Hispaniola and Puerto Rico. The last rupture of this fault occurred in 1842; the resulting earthquake and tsunami devastated Cap Haitien. Considerable seismic hazard continues to exist on this fault:

The results of trenching across the Septentrional Fault in the Ciabo valley have identified large earthquakes, similar in character to that in 1842, at around 1230 and another historical event in 1562. Assuming that these earthquakes were caused by displacement on the same segment of the fault, a recurrence interval of about 300 years is indicated, similar to that proposed for the Enriquillo fault in the southern part of the island.

The Windward Passage region was studied in detail by a voyage of the EV Nautilus in August 2014, assisted by the ROV Hercules. This expedition provided measurements of water circulation through the straight, as well as observations of animal life on the deep continental shelf.

== See also ==
- Leeward Passage – Channel in the United States Virgin Islands
