= PEPPADEP =

1980s pig health and farming development program in Haiti

The Program to Eradicate African Swine Fever and to Develop Pig Raising (French: Programme pour l’éradication de la peste porcine africaine et pour le développement de l'élevage porcin, PEPPADEP) was a development project which took place in Haiti in the 1980s. It was launched in 1981 by the Food and Agriculture Organization of the United Nations; the Instituto Interamericano de Ciencias Agrícolas (IICA), a branch of the Organization of American States; the International Development Bank; the governments of Mexico, Canada, the United States; and the government of Haiti to "eliminate the debilitating effects of African swine fever (ASF) in Haiti and to begin development of a productive swine industry".

African swine fever is a highly infectious and deadly disease of pigs, which decimates swine populations because neither vaccinations nor treatment are available. When ASF first appeared in the Dominican Republic, the Haitian government ordered the extermination of all Haitian swine on the border within a radius of 15 kilometers. 100,000 pigs were slaughtered. The peasants received no compensation for the losses they suffered and the preventive measure failed to stop the disease from spreading. In late 1978 ASF spread to Haiti. Haiti's northern neighbors watched the spread with apprehension. Studies indicated that if African swine fever ever came to the United States it could wreak $150 million to $5 billion worth of damage. This fear led the American, Canadian, and Mexican governments, through IICA, to impose a swine fever eradication plan on the Haitian government. This plan, PEPPADEP, was simple: kill all the swine in Haiti and restock the swine population with foreign pigs—either from the United States, Canada, or Mexico.

ASF is a highly contagious viral disease infecting domestic pigs, warthogs and bush pigs, as well as soft ticks. The virus causes a lethal haemorraghic disease in domestic pigs; some strains can cause death of animals within as little as a week after infection. The disease was first recorded in Kenya in 1921 and is found in most sub-Saharan African countries. It spread to southern Europe in 1957 and the Caribbean in the 1970s. ASF made its way from Europe or Africa to the Dominican Republic, and the spread to Haiti.

The eradication efforts were nearly complete when it was discovered that populations of feral swine existed throughout the rural countryside. The Southeastern Cooperative Wildlife Disease Study (SCWDS) worked in concert with the USDA to identify and eliminate feral swine populations which harbored the ASF virus in Haiti. Numerous feral populations were identified and one particular population north of Gonaives tested positive for the virus. SCWDS enlisted the use of American and Haitian hog-hunting dogs to reduce the populations. Wildlife Biologist and seasoned hog hunter Mark W. Hall lead the effort for SCWDS with wildlife technician Matthew Knox. Dozens of feral swine were eliminated in the areas of Jacmel, Gonaives, Petit-Trou-de-Nippes, and Cap-Haitien. Hall and Knox sampled a dead boar known as the "Voodoo Hog" that was killed by a group of Haitiens armed with machetes in a cane field west of Cap-Haitien, and biologist Peter K. Swiderek wrapped up the feral swine disease investigation for SCWDS.

President Jean-Claude Duvalier declared the disease eradicated in the country on April 28, 1982, and the PEPPADEP program was officially closed the following year. Roughly 384,000 pigs ended up being culled at a cost of around $9.5 million.
