= Christmas amnesty =

German tradition of amnesty in late December

Christmas amnesty (German: Weihnachtsamnestie) or Grace (German: Gnadenerweis) is the process of early amnesty of prisoners and their deeds in the run-up to 24 December (Christmas) in Germany and Austria. This process is intended to facilitate reintegration into society.

== Germany ==
A reform of the system of federalism in 2006 made Christmas amnesty a matter for the states (German: Länder). Therefore, they individually decide how and to what extent they implement a Christmas amnesty. Bavaria does not conduct any Christmas amnesty, they reason that the Christmas amnesty would give some prisoners unfair advantages.

Only prisoners whose prison term would end anyway in the period between mid-November and the first week of January can be released early. Usually prisoners with substitute custodial sentences benefit from this regulation, these are imposed on people who have not paid their fines. Excluded are those who have committed serious offences such as narcotics, violent or sexual offences, who have not attracted any negative attention in prison, or have to serve a long prison sentence. The prisoners have to agree on their release but accommodation and subsistence must be also provided by the prisoners. The early releasement allows prisoners to finish officials visits (e.g. unemployment office) early before the national holidays or to visit support services and counselling centres.

Prisoners do not always want to be released early. In 2019, 69 out of 963 total early released prisoners declined their early amnesty.

In 2021, 790 prisoners were released early from prisons in Germany.

== Other countries ==
Some states, such as the USA, conduct one-time Christmas amnesties.
