= 1939 Haitian constitutional referendum =

23 July 1939

Results
Choice	Votes	%
Yes	230,949	99.76%
No	566	0.24%

A constitutional referendum was held in Haiti on 23 July 1939. The changes abolished the direct election of the President and referendums as President Sténio Vincent considered them a "waste of time". The proposals were approved a reported 99.9% of voters, and put into effect by Parliament on 8 August.

== Results ==
Choice	Votes	%
For	230,949	99.76
Against	566	0.24
Total	231,515	100.00
Source: Le Nouvelliste.
