= 1986 Haitian Constitutional Assembly election =

Constitutional Assembly elections were held in Haiti on 19 October 1986. Voters elected 41 of the 61 seats, with the remaining 20 appointed by the National Council of Government (CNG). The CNG claimed that voter turnout was 9.2%, although it was widely reported to be under 5%. A total of 101 candidates contested the 41 seats, which were based on the country's arrondissements.

== Aftermath ==
The Assembly started meeting on 1 December, and drafted a new constitution, which was approved in a referendum the following year.
