= Creole pig =

Breed of pig

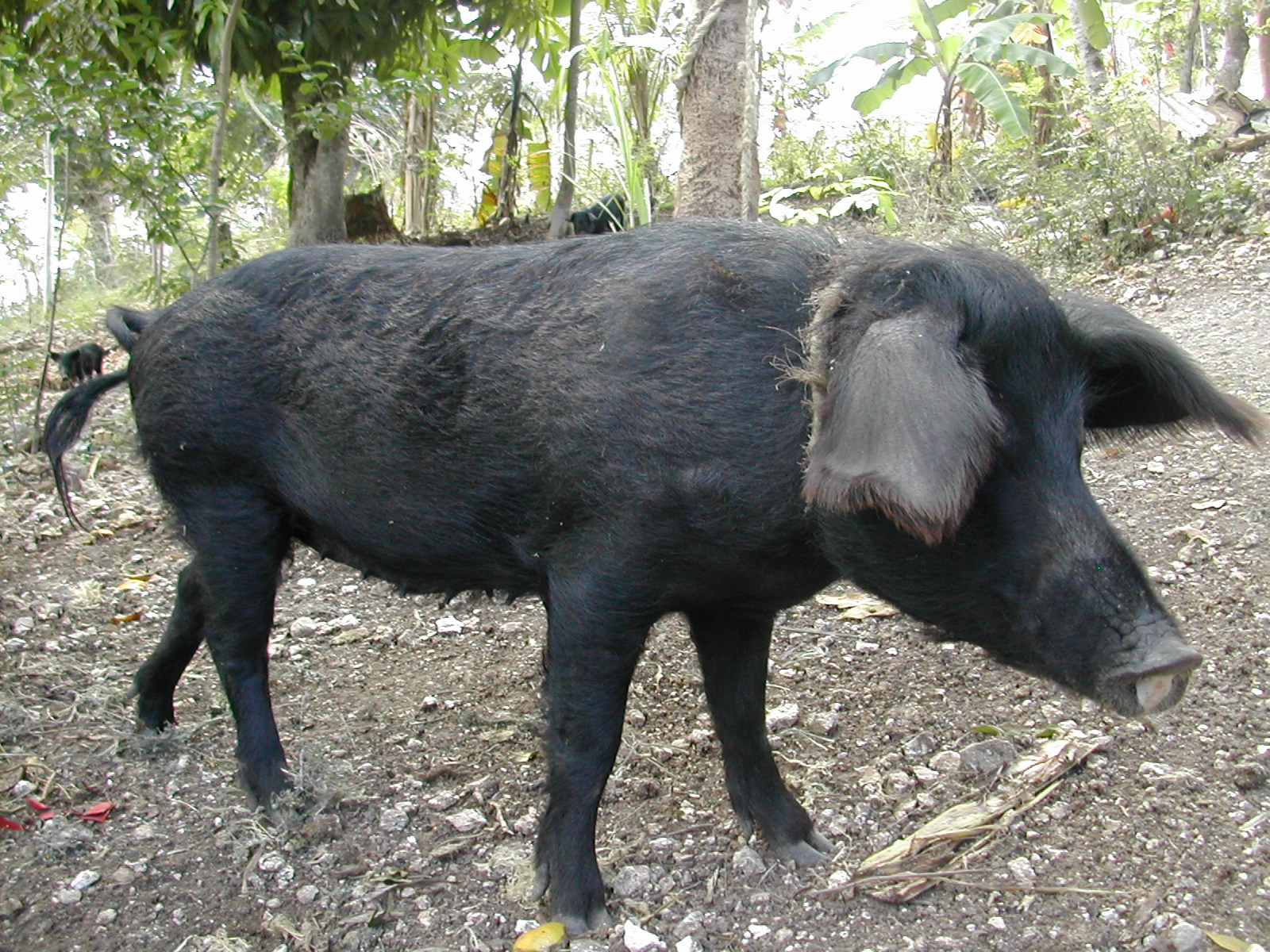
- Conservation status: Extant
- Country of origin: Haiti

Traits

The Creole pig is a landrace of pig indigenous to Hispaniola.

Creole pigs are well adapted to local conditions, such as available feed and conditions needed for their management as livestock, and were popular with the Haitian peasant farmers until an extermination campaign in the 1980s. They served as a type of savings account for the Haitian peasant: sold or slaughtered to pay for marriages, medical emergencies, schooling, seeds for crops, or Voodoo ceremonies. The dark black pigs are known for their boisterous nature and have been incorporated into elements of vodou folklore and the oral history of the Haitian Revolution.

In the late 1970s an outbreak of African swine fever hit the neighboring Dominican Republic and spread to Haiti. Officials feared it would spread to the United States, where it could devastate the pork industry. The United States Agency for International Development, USAID, and the Haitian government led a campaign, known by the French acronym PEPPADEP (French: Programme pour l’éradication de la peste porcine africaine et pour le développement de l'élevage porcin), to exterminate Haiti's pigs. Farmers who were compensated received pigs imported from the United States that were far more vulnerable to Haiti's environment and expensive to keep. In the year following the slaughter, levels of enrollment in schools were dramatically lower throughout Haiti's countryside.

In the Haitian peasant community, the government's eradication and repopulation program was highly criticized. The peasants protested that they were not fairly compensated for their pigs and that the breed of pigs imported from the United States to replace the hardy Creole pigs was unsuitable for the Haitian environment and economy.

In recent years, Haitian and French agronomists have bred a new variety of pig similar to Haiti's Creole pig. An effort to repopulate Haiti with these pigs is underway. The original creole pig is reported to have survived in small numbers in the Haitian countryside.
