= Tonton Macoute =

Haitian paramilitary force under the Duvalier family (1959–1986)

Volontaires de la Sécurité Nationale
- Tonton Macoute; Tonton Makout

Paramilitary organization overview
- Formed: 1959
- Preceding agencies: Cagoulards; Milice Civile
- Dissolved: 1986
- Superseding paramilitary organization: Several semi-legal paramilitary organizations
- Type: Secret police
- Jurisdiction: Haiti
- Headquarters: Port-au-Prince
- Employees: 25,000 in 1959
- Paramilitary organization executives: Clément Barbot; Luckner Cambronne; Roger Lafontant
- Parent paramilitary organization: PUN
- Agency ID: VSN

The Tonton Macoute (Haitian Creole: Tonton Makout [tɔ̃tɔ̃ makut]) or simply the Macoute, was a Haitian paramilitary and secret police force during the Duvalier family rule, created in 1959 by dictator François "Papa Doc" Duvalier. Haitians named this force after the Haitian mythological bogeyman, Tonton Macoute ("Uncle Gunnysack"), who kidnaps and punishes unruly children by snaring them in a gunny sack (macoute) before carrying them off to be consumed for breakfast. The Macoute were known for their brutality, state terrorism, and assassinations. In 1970, the militia was renamed the Volontaires de la Sécurité Nationale (VSN, English: National Security Volunteers). Though formally disbanded in 1986, its members continued to terrorize the country.

== History ==
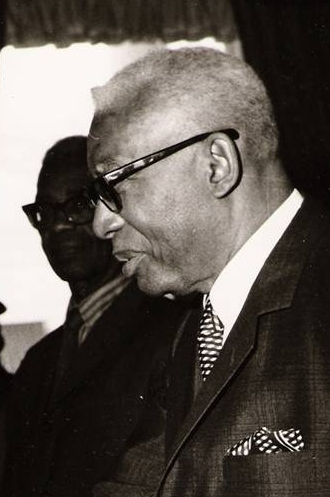
"Papa Doc" Duvalier created the Tontons Macoutes because he perceived the regular military to be a threat to his power.

After the July 1958 Haitian coup attempt against President François Duvalier, he purged the Haitian Army and law enforcement agencies in Haiti and executed numerous officers perceived to be a threat to his regime. To counteract such activity, he created a military force that bore several names. In 1959, his paramilitary force was called the Cagoulards ("Hooded Men"). They were renamed to Milice Civile (Civilian Militia) and, after 1962, Volontaires de la Sécurité Nationale (National Security Volunteers, or VSN). They began to be called the Tonton Macoute when people disappeared or were found dead for no apparent reason. This group answered to him only.

Duvalier authorized the Tontons Macoutes to commit all manner of systematic violence, terrorism, and human rights abuses to suppress political opposition. They were responsible for unknown numbers of murders and rapes in Haiti. Political opponents often disappeared overnight, or were sometimes attacked in broad daylight. Tontons Macoutes stoned and burned people alive. Many times they put the corpses of their victims on display, often hung in trees for everyone to see and take as warnings against opposition. Family members who tried to remove the bodies for proper burial often disappeared. Anyone who challenged the VSN risked assassination. Their unrestrained state terrorism was accompanied by corruption, extortion, and personal aggrandizement among the leadership. The victims of Tontons Macoutes could range from a woman in the poorest of neighborhoods who had previously supported an opposing politician to a businessman who refused to comply with extortion threats (ostensibly taken as donations for public works, but which were in fact the source of profit for corrupt officials and even President Duvalier). The Tontons Macoutes murdered between 30,000 and 60,000 Haitians.

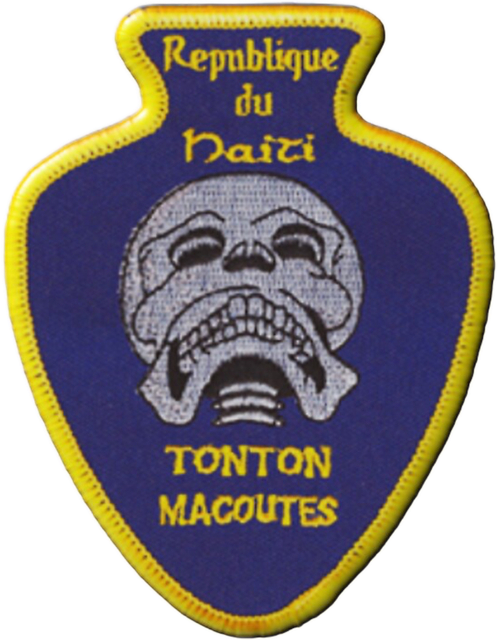
A patch attributed to the Tonton Macoutes

Luckner Cambronne led the Tontons Macoute throughout the 1960s and the beginning of the 1970s. His cruelty earned him the nickname "Vampire of the Caribbean". He extorted blood plasma from locals for sale for his profit. Cambronne did this through his company "Hemocaribian"; he shipped five tons of plasma per month to US labs. He also sold cadavers to medical schools after buying them from Haitian hospitals for $3 per corpse. When the hospital could not supply bodies, he used local funeral homes.

In 1971, after Duvalier died, his widow Simone and son Jean-Claude "Baby Doc" Duvalier ordered Cambronne into exile. Cambronne moved to Miami, Florida, US, where he lived until his death in 2006.

When François Duvalier came to power in 1957, Vodou was becoming celebrated as authentic Haitian culture by intellectuals and the griots, after it had been dropped for years by those with education. The Tonton Macoute were strongly influenced by Vodou tradition and adopted denim uniforms resembling clothing like that of Azaka Medeh, the patron of farmers. They carried and used machetes in symbolic reference to Ogun, a great general in Vodou tradition.

Some of the most important members of the Tontons Macoute were Vodou leaders. This religious affiliation gave the Tontons Macoute a kind of unearthly authority in the eyes of the public. From their methods to their choice of clothes, Vodou always played an important role in the paramilitary's actions. The Tonton Macoutes wore straw hats, blue denim shirts and dark glasses, and were armed with machetes and guns. Both their allusions to the supernatural and their physical presentations were used to instill fear and respect among the common people, including any opposition actors. Their title of Tonton Macoute was embedded in Haitian lore of a bogeyman who took children away in his sack, or Makoute.

The Tontons Macoute were a ubiquitous presence at the polls in 1961, when Duvalier held a presidential referendum in which the official vote count was an "outrageous" and fraudulent 1,320,748 to 0, electing him to another term. They appeared in force again at the polls in 1964, when Duvalier held a constitutional referendum that declared him president for life.

== Legacy ==
From 1985, the United States began to stop funding aid to Haiti, cutting nearly a million dollars within a year. Nonetheless, the Baby Doc regime pushed forward and even had a national party for the Tontons Macoute. Tonton Macoute day was 29 July 1985; among the festivities, the group was bestowed new uniforms and was honored by all of Baby Doc's cabinet. In the exuberance, the Tonton Macoute went out into the streets and shot 27 people for the national party.

The lack of funds going to the Tonton Macoute was a result of those funds being intercepted by the Duvalier family. It sometimes took nearly 80 percent of international aid to Haiti, but paid only 45 percent of the country's debts. This continued until the Tonton Macoute was left on its own when Baby Doc fled the country with an estimated $900 million.

The Tonton Macoute remained active even after the presidency of Baby Doc ended in 1986, at the height of the anti-Duvalier protest movement. Massacres led by paramilitary groups spawned from the Macoutes continued during the following decade. The most feared paramilitary group during the 1990s was the Front for the Advancement and Progress of Haïti (FRAPH), which Toronto Star journalist Linda Diebel described as modern Tonton Macoutes, and not the legitimate political party it claimed to be.

Led by Emmanuel Constant, FRAPH differed from the Tonton Macoute in its refusal to submit to the will of a single authority and its cooperation with regular military forces. FRAPH extended its reach far outside that of the Haitian state and had offices present in New York City, Montreal, and Miami until its disarmament and disbandment in 1994.

== Representation in other media ==
- In Wolfen (1981), the bodyguard killed by the Wolfen at the beginning of the film is referred to as being tough and formerly of the Tonton Macoute.
- The Comedians (1966) is a novel by Graham Greene about the struggle of a former hotel owner against the Tonton Macoute. It was adapted as a feature film starring Richard Burton, Elizabeth Taylor, Peter Ustinov and Alec Guinness.
- Ton-Ton Macoute!, a 1970 album by Johnny Jenkins.
- "Heaven Knows," a song by Robert Plant on his album Now and Zen, references the Tonton Macoute.
- The Serpent and the Rainbow (1988), a horror film directed by Wes Craven, loosely based on the book of the same name, deals with Haitian Vodou and political repression under the Duvaliers.
- The Dew Breaker (2004) is a novel by Edwidge Danticat that features the Tonton Macoute as important in the plot.
- Prior to her solo career, Sinéad O'Connor sang in a band called Ton Ton Macoute.
- The Tonton Macoute is also mentioned in season 1, episode 9 of the television series Dexter. In the episode, an ex-Cagoulard is recognized and killed by Miami-Dade police sergeant James Doakes, who was formerly stationed in Haiti as an Army Ranger. Despite having evidence that Sergeant Doakes lied about firing his weapon in self-defense, the DA's office drops the investigation into the killing at the request of the federal government.
- Don Byron mentions the Tonton Macoute while describing Haitian immigrant Abner Louima's brutal interrogation by the NYC Police in his song "Morning 98 (Blinky)" from the 1998 album Nu Blaxploitation.
- The track "Tonton Macoutes" appears on the 1987 album Coup d'État by Muslimgauze.
- In the 2016 video game Mafia III, the New Bordeaux Haitian Mob is composed mainly of refugees who fled Haiti to escape from persecution by the Tonton Macoute.
- In the television series The Thick of It, the character Malcolm Tucker jokes in response to why he enters a room without knocking that it is due to his "time with the Haitian death squads".
- In NSV, the character Nasalis states that in 1974 he felt sympathetic towards the Haitian national football team, not being aware of Jean-Claude Duvalier at the time. The character Erik replied that the Tonton Macoute was already keeping an eye on him.
- In Toni Morrison's essay, "The Habit of Art", she refers to the practice of the Tonton Macoute targeting those people who attempted to bury their loved ones who had been murdered and displayed by the paramilitary.
- Shrunken Heads (film), features the character Aristide Sumatra, a voodoo priest and former member of the Tonton Macoute. He uses that background to train three shrunken heads to fight criminals.
- In Shannon Mayer's Forty-Proof series, the 4th installment (titled Midlife Ghost Hunter) uses a voodoo zombie army called the Tonton Macoutes as the main villain's army. The story takes place in New Orleans, also a center of Vodou.
- In the TV series Justified, Season 5, Episode 01, "A Murder of Crows", Raylan, the protagonist, mentions the Tonton Macoute while questioning a Haitian suspect. He says that the man's appearance and attitude suggests he had been a member of the paramilitary.
- In the TV series Two and a Half Men, Season 3 Episode 17: "The Unfortunate Little Schnauzer", Archie Baldwin makes a reference to Tonton Macoute in his UN jingle for orphaned children.
- Roxane Gay's short story "A Cool, Dry Place" (in ayiti Creole language) features characters who recall losing their parents to the Tonton Macoute.

== See also ==
- General Security Directorate, a similar paramilitary organization and the secret police to the Duvalier regime by the Assad family
- Blackshirts
- Mongoose Gang
- Shower Posse
