= Michèle Bennett =

Former First Lady of Haiti (born 1950)

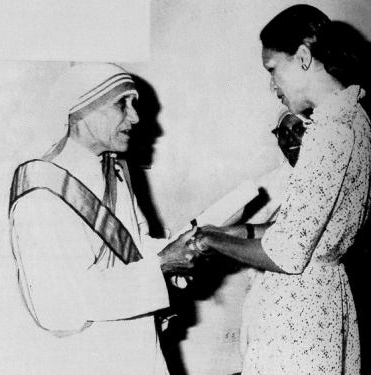
- Bennett (right) in 1981

First Lady of Haiti
- In role 27 May 1980 – 7 February 1986
- President: Jean-Claude Duvalier
- Preceded by: Simone Duvalier
- Succeeded by: Gisèle Célestin Namphy

Personal details
- Born: 15 January 1950 (age 76) Port‑au‑Prince, Haiti
- Citizenship: Haiti
- Spouses: Alix Pasquet Jr. (m. 1973; div. 1978) Jean‑Claude Duvalier (m. 1980; div. 1990)
- Children: Alix Pasquet III, Sacha Pasquet, Francois-Nicolas Duvalier and Anya Michele Duvalier
- Occupation: First Lady of Haiti

Michèle Bennett (born 15 January 1950) is the former First Lady of Haiti and the ex‑wife of former President of Haiti, Jean‑Claude Duvalier. They fled to France together when he resigned in 1986; they divorced in 1990.

== Early life ==
Michèle Bennett was born in Port-au-Prince, Haiti, in 1950, the daughter of Aurore (née Ligondé) and Ernest Bennett, a Haitian businessman and descendant of King Henry I of Haiti. Her father owned more than 50,000 acres (20,000 ha) of land, growing mostly coffee, and employing 1,600 estate workers in addition to 900 more in his business. Her uncle was Haiti's Roman Catholic Archbishop, François-Wolff Ligondé. At 15, Bennett moved to New York, where she was educated at St. Mary's School in Peekskill. She went on to work as a secretary at a slipper company in New York City's Garment District. In 1973, she married Alix Pasquet, Jr., the son of Captain Alix Pasquet, a well-known mulatto officer and Tuskegee Airman who, in 1958, led a coup attempt against François Duvalier. By Pasquet, she had two children, Alix III and Sacha. After her 1978 divorce from Pasquet, she had a career in public relations for Habitation LeClerc, an upscale hotel in Port‑au‑Prince.

== Marriage ==
Although Bennett met Jean‑Claude Duvalier in high school, the pair did not become romantically engaged until ten years later. She was first married to Alix Pasquet Jr. in 1973, whom she divorced in 1978. In 1980, Bennett married President Duvalier. Their wedding, Haiti's social event of the decade, cost an unprecedented US $ 2 million and was reported to be received enthusiastically by the majority of Haitians. Michèle Duvalier at first endeared herself to the population by distributing clothes and food to the needy as well as opening several medical clinics and schools for the poor. In the six weeks following the wedding, Michèle and Jean‑Claude toured Haiti, turning up unannounced at meetings, marketplaces, and other gathering places, which garnered "approving glances and words most everywhere". On a visit to Haiti, Mother Teresa remarked that she had "never seen the poor people being so familiar with their head of state as they were with [Michèle]". With Jean‑Claude, Michèle had her third and fourth children: Francois-Nicolas and Anya.

The marriage represented a symbolic alliance with the mulatto elite, the families Jean‑Claude's father had opposed. This resulted in her husband's mother, Simone Duvalier, who opposed the match, being sidelined politically, which in turn created new factional alliances within the ruling group since the Duvalierist Old Guard opined that the new First Lady's power appeared to exceed her husband's. While Jean‑Claude often dozed through Cabinet meetings, his wife, frustrated at his political ineptitude, reprimanded ministers herself.

== First lady ==
Accusations of or associations with corruption plagued the Duvalier–Bennett marriage. Michèle's father, Ernest Bennett, took advantage of his presidential connection to extend interests into his businesses, from his BMW dealership, to his coffee and cocoa export concerns, to Air Haiti, in whose planes Bennett was rumored to be transporting drugs. In 1982, Frantz Bennett, Michèle's brother, was arrested in Puerto Rico for drug trafficking, and began a three‑year jail term.

She was instrumental in the conception, inauguration and permanent collection of the Musée du Panthéon National Haïtien, which opened under her husband's presidency in Port-au-Prince in 1983.

Michèle Duvalier's family amassed wealth during the later part of Jean‑Claude's dictatorship. By the end of his 15‑year rule, Duvalier and his wife had become notorious for their corruption. The National Palace became the scene of opulent costume parties, where the young President once appeared dressed as a Turkish sultan to dole out ten‑thousand‑dollar jewels as door prizes.

While on a visit to Haiti in 1983, Pope John Paul II declared that "things must change in Haiti", and he called on "all those who have power, riches and culture so that they can understand the serious and urgent responsibility to help their brothers and sisters". Popular uprising against the regime began soon after that. Duvalier responded with a 10% reduction in staple food prices, the closing of independent radio stations, a cabinet reshuffle, and a crackdown by police and army units, but these moves failed to dampen the momentum of the popular uprising.

His wife and advisers urged him to put down the rebellion in order to remain in office. In response to widening opposition to 28 years of Duvalier rule, on 7 February 1986, the Duvaliers fled the rioting country in an American C-141 plane accompanied by 19 other people.

== Exile ==
The governments of Greece, Spain, Switzerland, Gabon and Morocco all refused the Duvalier family's requests for asylum. France agreed to give the Duvaliers temporary entry but also denied them asylum. Soon after their arrival in France, their home was raided as part of an investigation into pillaging Haiti's treasury. Bennett was found trying to flush documentation down a toilet. Her papers documented recent spending including US $168,780 for Givenchy clothing, US $270,200 for Boucheron jewelry and US $9,752 for two children's horse saddles at Hermès. In 1987, a French civil court dismissed Haiti's lawsuit against the Duvaliers, which sought to have the Duvaliers held responsible to repay money to Haiti.

In 1990, Jean‑Claude Duvalier filed for divorce from Bennett in the Dominican Republic, accusing her of immoral acts. Bennett, who was living with another man in Cannes at the time, contested the decision, flying to the Dominican Republic to obtain a reversal before her husband prevailed in a third court. She was awarded alimony and child support. She moved with her children to Paris.

In the wake of the 2010 Haiti earthquake, Bennett returned to Haiti with a search and rescue team to look for her brother Rudy Bennett in the rubble of the Hôtel Montana. Bennett returned to Haiti for Jean‑Claude Duvalier's funeral on 11 October 2014. She organized and attended the service with her children from their marriage, at a chapel on the grounds of the Institution Saint-Louis de Gonzague school in the Delmas district of Port‑au‑Prince after then-president Michel Martelly promised, then refused, a state funeral for the former head of state.

In 2021, she gave an interview to Polo Lifestyles magazine, her first interview since Barbara Walters flew to Mougins in 1986 to interview her. In the interview, she spoke openly about her upbringing, her faith, her wedding, her marriage, the events leading to exile and life in France.

Honorary titles
Preceded by Simone Duvalier	First Lady of Haiti; 1980–1986	Succeeded by Gabrielle Namphy
