= Roger Lafontant =

Haitian minister and leader of the Tonton Macoutes

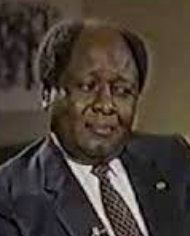
Roger Lafontant

Roger Lafontant (1931– 29 September 1991) was the former leader of the Tonton Macoutes and a former minister in the government of Haitian dictator Jean-Claude Duvalier. He was the leader of an attempted coup d'état in January 1991, an effort which ultimately led to his death.

== Early life ==
As a student studying to become a gynecologist, he founded the student branch of the Tontons Macoutes, a paramilitary organization which supported the dictatorship of President François Duvalier and his son Jean-Claude Duvalier.

== Duvalier era ==
In November 1972, he became Minister of the Interior and National Defense. Jean-Claude Duvalier then demoted him because of Lafontant’s personal ambitions. He was then sent as consul to Montreal, Canada. He returned in August 1983, and was appointed Minister of State for the Interior and National Defense.

In 1986, with the fall of Jean-Claude Duvalier, he went again into exile to the Dominican Republic.

== Return to Haiti after exile ==
He reappeared 7 July 1990, to enter the race for the presidency at the head of the Union for National Reconciliation. Radio Liberté, founded by Serge Beaulieu, which was nostalgic for the Duvalier era, supported the candidacy of Lafontant on AM and FM bands. His candidacy was rejected by the Provisional Electoral Council (CEP). On 18 July 1990 an arrest warrant was issued against him following a court proceeding against him.

== Attempted coup d'état ==
During the democratic elections in Haiti from 1990 to 1991, Lafontant attempted a coup on the night of 6–7 January 1991. While Lafontant claimed to have the support of the army, General Hérard Abraham and the military high command immediately condemned the coup. In a statement to the public, Abraham spoke on Monday morning, on the mutiny of a group "in the pay of Roger Lafontant" who hijacked the provisional President of the Republic, Ertha Pascal-Trouillot and "forced (her) to resign." Abraham said that "the armed forces of Haiti, faithful to their constitutional responsibilities", condemned the "terrorist act" and "take all steps to ensure that the situation returns to normal." He called on the population to remain calm."

The international community and the Organization of American States condemned the attempt to overthrow the provisional government of Haiti. The day of the coup, the OAS Permanent Council held an emergency meeting to discuss the situation in Haiti and decided to support the interim government. Some 75 people were killed and over 150 others were injured in the violence that erupted in Port-au-Prince during the attempted coup. Lafontant was arrested with a dozen accomplices, soldiers, and militia members of the Tontons Macoutes.

== Aftermath and death ==
On 31 July 1991, Lafontant was sentenced to life in prison for his attempted coup against the government of Haiti. He was killed in prison later that year on 29 September 1991, while Aristide's government was being toppled by Raoul Cédras's military junta.

In 1994, his wife, Gladys (who moved to Queens), filed a lawsuit against Aristide (then in exile in the US) where she alleged that Aristide had personally ordered the execution of Lafontant immediately prior to his fleeing to Venezuela. The military junta charged Aristide with the assassination. As the US still recognized Aristide as the lawful President of Haiti and he thus enjoyed head-of-state immunity, Gladys's lawsuit was dismissed.
