= Simone Duvalier =

Former First Lady of Haiti

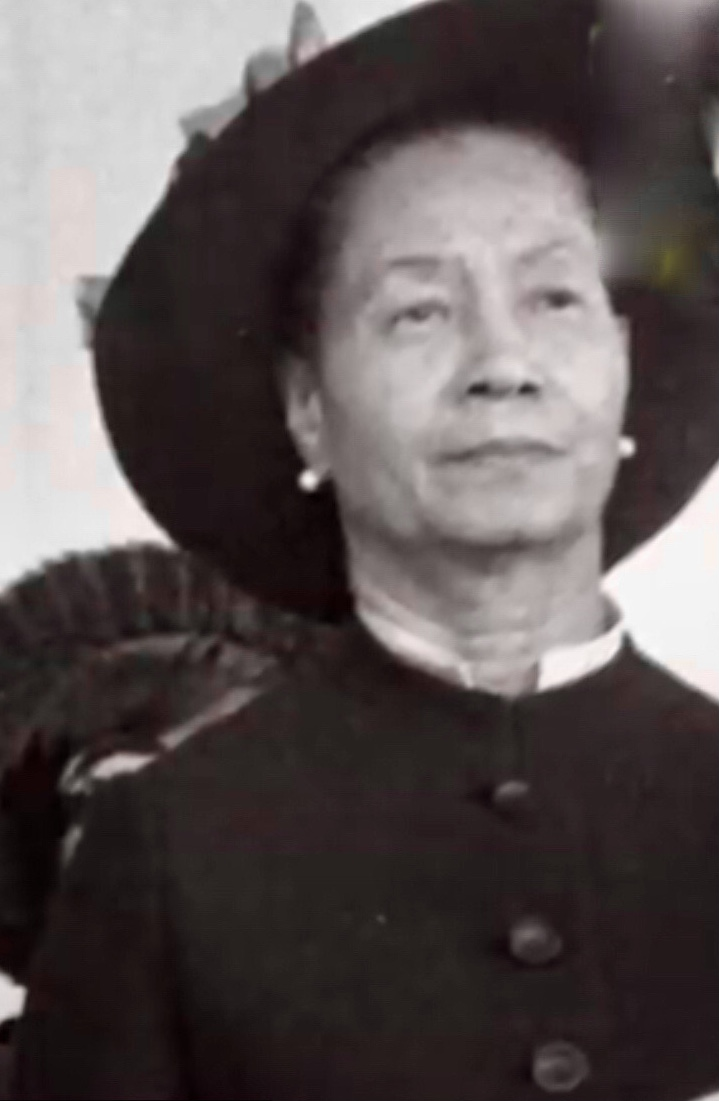
- Duvalier in 1971

First Lady of Haiti
- In role 22 October 1957 – 27 May 1980
- President: François Duvalier; Jean-Claude Duvalier
- Preceded by: Marie Yvonne Charles Kébreau
- Succeeded by: Michèle Bennett

Personal details
- Born: Simone Ovide; 19 March 1913 Léogâne, Haiti
- Died: 26 December 1997 (aged 84) Paris, France
- Spouse: François Duvalier (m. 1939; died 1971)
- Children: 4, including Jean-Claude

Simone Duvalier (French pronunciation: [simɔn dyvalje]; née Ovide; 19 March 1913 – 26 December 1997), also known as Mama Doc, was the wife of Haitian leader François "Papa Doc" Duvalier and the First Lady of Haiti.

== Early life ==
She was born Simone Ovide in about 1913 near the Haitian town of Léogâne, the daughter of a mulatto merchant and writer, Jules Faine, and Célie Ovide, one of the maids in his household. At an early age her mother gave her up, and she spent much of her childhood in an orphanage in Pétion-Ville, an exclusive suburb in the hills above Port-au-Prince. The orphans were encouraged to acquire vocational skills and Simone Ovide was trained as a nurse's aide. While working as a nurse she met a young doctor named François Duvalier (Papa Doc). The couple was married on 27 December 1939, and had four children: Marie Denise, Nicole, Simone “Queen”, and Jean-Claude, their only son.

== First Lady ==
After their marriage, François Duvalier became minister of public health and labor in 1949 and won election to the presidency in 1957. Throughout his 14 years in office, his wife guarded access to her husband and developed and promoted her own palace favorites.

Because of her acquired status and her imperious bearing, Haitians referred to her as "Mama Doc". She was, like her husband, reported to be a Vodou expert. She cultivated the image of a benefactor; dispensing charity to inhabitants of "Cite Simone", a planned settlement named for her that is known today as Cité Soleil, one of the most miserable slums in Latin America.

Simone Duvalier's influence reached its peak after the death of her husband on 21 April 1971, when her nineteen-year-old son Jean-Claude Duvalier (Baby Doc) succeeded his father as Haiti's "President for Life". Simone Duvalier retained the title of First Lady, and relished the power it conferred. According to a number of her associates, she deeply resented having to relinquish that role after Jean-Claude Duvalier married in 1980 and she was demoted to "Guardian of the Duvalierist Revolution".

== Exile and death ==
When her son was ousted from power in February 1986, Simone Duvalier joined him and his wife, Michèle Bennett, in exile in France. She was rarely seen in public. After her son's bitter divorce from his wife, Simone Duvalier lived with her son in relative poverty in the suburbs of Paris.

She died on 26 December 1997 at the age of 84.

Honorary titles
| Preceded by Marie Yvonne Charles | First Lady of Haiti; 1957–1980 | Succeeded by Michèle Bennet |
