= 1971 Haitian constitutional referendum =

30 January 1971
- Citizen Dr. François Duvalier has chosen Citizen Jean-Claude Duvalier to succeed him as Life President of the Republic. Does this choice meet your aspirations and desires? Do you ratify it?

Results
Choice	Votes	%
Yes	2,319,916	100.00%
No	1	0.00%
Valid votes	2,319,917	100.00%
Invalid or blank votes	2	0.00%
Total votes	2,319,919	100.00%

A constitutional referendum was held in Haiti on 30 January 1971. Before the referendum, the Haitian parliament had voted in favour of lowering the age limit for becoming president from 40 years to 20, as well as confirming Jean-Claude Duvalier, son of ailing dictator François Duvalier at 21 years of age, which would allow him to succeed his father.

Ballots were printed with the "yes" option already filled in. Although the official count was 2,391,916 in favour and no votes against, it was reported that there were two blank ballots and one "no" vote.

== Results ==
Choice	Votes	%
For	2,319,916	100.00
Against	1	0.00
Total	2,319,917	100.00
Valid votes	2,319,917	100.00
Invalid/blank votes	2	0.00
Total votes	2,319,919	100.00
Source: Manchester Evening Herald
