= 1964 Haitian constitutional referendum =

14 June 1964

Results
Choice	Votes	%
Yes	2,800,000	99.88%
No	3,235	0.12%

A constitutional referendum was held in Haiti on 14 June 1964 alongside general elections. The new constitution made President François "Papa Doc" Duvalier president for life, with absolute power and the right to name his successor. It also changed the country's flag from blue and red to black and red, with the black symbolising the country's ties to Africa.

The referendum was rigged, with all ballots already marked yes, and no limit on how many times each person could vote. A total of 2.8 million people voted for the proposal and only 3,235 against. The National Assembly approved the vote on 21 June and Duvalier was sworn in the following day.

== Results ==
Choice	Votes	%
For	2,800,000	99.88
Against	3,235	0.12
Total	2,803,235	100.00
Source: Nohlen
