= Jean-Claude Duvalier =

President of Haiti from 1971 to 1986

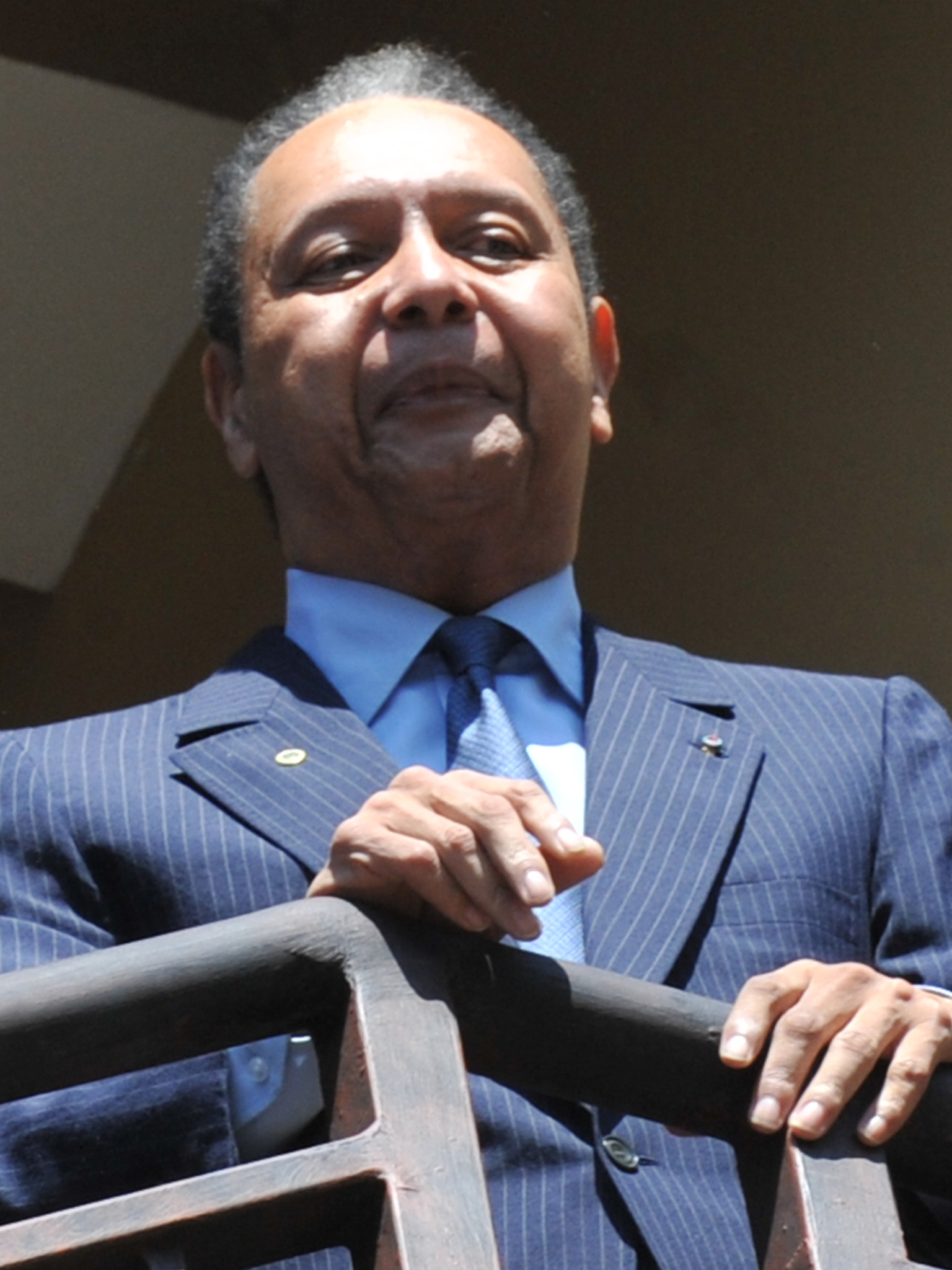
- Duvalier in 2011

35th President of Haiti
- In office 22 April 1971 – 7 February 1986
- Preceded by: François Duvalier
- Succeeded by: Henri Namphy

Personal details
- Born: 3 July 1951 Port-au-Prince, Haiti
- Died: 4 October 2014 (aged 63) Port-au-Prince, Haiti
- Party: PUN
- Spouse: Michèle Bennett (m. 1980; div. 1990)
- Domestic partner(s): Véronique Roy (1990–2014)
- Children: 2
- Parents: François Duvalier (father); Simone Ovide (mother)
- Education: University of Haiti
- Nickname: Baby Doc

Jean-Claude Duvalier (French: [ʒɑ̃klod dyvalje]; 3 July 1951 – 4 October 2014), nicknamed "Baby Doc" (Haitian Creole: Bebe Dòk, French: Bébé Doc), was a Haitian dictator who held the presidency of Haiti from 1971 until he was overthrown by a popular uprising in February 1986. He succeeded his father François "Papa Doc" Duvalier as the ruler of Haiti after his death in 1971. After assuming power, he introduced cosmetic changes to his father's regime and delegated much authority to his advisors. Thousands of Haitians were tortured and killed, and hundreds of thousands fled the country during his presidency. He maintained a notoriously lavish lifestyle (including a state-sponsored US$2 million wedding in 1980) while poverty among his people remained the most widespread of any country in the Western Hemisphere.

Relations with the United States improved after Duvalier's ascension to the presidency, and later deteriorated under the Carter administration, only to normalize under Ronald Reagan due to the strong anti-communist stance of the Duvaliers. Rebellion against the Duvalier regime broke out in 1985, and Duvalier fled to France in 1986 on a U.S. Air Force flight.

Duvalier unexpectedly returned to Haiti on 16 January 2011, after two decades in self-imposed exile in France. The following day, he was arrested by Haitian police, facing possible charges for embezzlement. On 18 January, Duvalier was charged with corruption. On 28 February 2013, Duvalier pleaded not guilty to charges of corruption and human rights abuse. He died of a heart attack on 4 October 2014, at the age of 63.

Transparency International determined that the money embezzled by Duvalier was the sixth most embezzled by a sitting head of government between 1984 and 2004.

== Early life ==
The son of Simone Ovide, a Mulatto-Haitian woman, and François Duvalier, a black nationalist anti-mulatto leader who became dictator of Haiti, Duvalier was born in Port-au-Prince and was brought up in an isolated environment. He attended Nouveau College Bird and Institution Saint-Louis de Gonzague. Later, he studied law at the University of Haiti under the direction of several professors, including Maître Gérard Gourgue.

== President of Haiti ==
In April 1971, he assumed the presidency of Haiti at the age of 19 upon the death of his father, François Duvalier (nicknamed "Papa Doc"), becoming the world's youngest president, as well as the only non-royal state leader under the age of 20. Initially, Jean-Claude Duvalier resisted the dynastic arrangement that had made him Haiti's leader, having preferred that the presidency go to his older sister Marie-Denise Duvalier. He was content to leave substantive and administrative matters in the hands of his mother, Simone Ovide Duvalier, and a committee led by Luckner Cambronne, his father's Interior Minister, while he attended ceremonial functions and lived as a playboy.

=== Political and economic factors ===
Duvalier was invested with absolute power by the constitution. He took some steps to reform the regime, by releasing some political prisoners and easing press censorship. However, there were no substantive changes to the regime's basic character. Opposition was not tolerated, and the legislature remained a rubber stamp.

Much of the Duvaliers' wealth came from the Régie du Tabac (Tobacco Administration). Duvalier used this "non-fiscal account", established decades earlier, as a tobacco monopoly, but he later expanded it to include the proceeds from other government enterprises and used it as a slush fund for which no balance sheets were ever kept.

By neglecting his role in government, Duvalier squandered considerable domestic and foreign goodwill and facilitated the dominance of Haitian affairs by a clique of hardline Duvalierist cronies, the so-called "dinosaurs". Foreign officials and observers also seemed tolerant toward Duvalier in areas such as human rights monitoring and foreign countries were more generous to him with economic assistance. The Nixon administration restored the United States aid program for Haiti in 1971.

=== Marriage ===
On 27 May 1980, Duvalier married divorcee Michèle Bennett in a wedding that cost US$2 million. The extravagance of the couple's wedding was criticized both by Haitian dissidents and the international press; though The Christian Science Monitor reported that "the event ... was enthusiastically received by a majority of Haitians". Discontent among the business community and elite intensified in response to increased corruption among the Duvaliers and the Bennett family's dealings, which included selling Haitian cadavers to foreign medical schools and trafficking in narcotics. Increased political repression added to the volatility of the situation.

The marriage also estranged the old-line Duvalierists in the government from the younger technocrats whom Duvalier had appointed, including Jean-Marie Chanoine, Frantz Merceron, Frantz-Robert Estime and Theo Achille. The Duvalierists' spiritual leader, Duvalier's mother, Simone Ovide Duvalier, was eventually expelled from Haiti, reportedly at the request of Michèle. With his wife Duvalier had two children, François Nicolas and Anya.

Over time, Michèle grew to become a power in her own right. For example, she dressed down ministers at cabinet meetings while her husband dozed.

=== Destabilisation ===
In response to an outbreak of African swine fever virus on the island in 1978, U.S. agricultural authorities insisted upon total eradication of Haiti's pig population in 1982. The Program for the Eradication of Porcine Swine Fever and for the Development of Pig Raising (PEPPADEP) spread already-serious economic devastation among the peasant population, who bred pigs as an investment.

In addition, reports that HIV/AIDS was becoming a major problem in Haiti caused tourism to decline dramatically in the early 1980s. By the mid-1980s, most Haitians expressed hopelessness and despair, as economic conditions further worsened and hunger and malnutrition spread.

Widespread discontent began manifesting further in March 1983, when Pope John Paul II visited Haiti. The pontiff declared that "things must change in Haiti", and he called on "all those who have power, riches and culture so that they can understand the serious and urgent responsibility to help their brothers and sisters". He called for a more equitable distribution of income, a more egalitarian social structure, and increased popular participation in public life. This message revitalized both laymen and clergy, contributed to increased popular mobilization and expanded political and social activism.

A revolt began in the provinces in 1985. The city of Gonaïves was the first to have street demonstrations and raids on food-distribution warehouses. From October 1985 to January 1986, the protests spread to six other cities, including Cap-Haïtien. By the end of that month, Haitians in the south had revolted. The most significant rioting there broke out in Les Cayes.

Duvalier responded with a 10 percent cut in staple food prices, the closing of independent radio stations, a cabinet reshuffle, and a crackdown by police and army units, but these moves failed to dampen the momentum of the popular uprising against the dynastic dictatorship. Duvalier's wife and advisers, intent on maintaining their grip on power, urged him to put down the rebellion and remain in office.

=== Departure ===
In January 1986, the Reagan administration began to pressure Duvalier to renounce his rule and to leave Haiti. Representatives appointed by Jamaican prime minister Edward Seaga served as intermediaries who carried out the negotiations. At this point a number of Duvalierists and business leaders met with the Duvaliers and pressed for their departure. The United States rejected a request to provide asylum for Duvalier, but offered to assist with their departure. On 30 January 1986, Duvalier had initially accepted, and President Reagan actually announced his departure based on a report from the Haitian CIA Station Chief who saw Duvalier's car head for the airport. Duvalier's party returned to the palace unnoticed by the U.S. intelligence team due to their motorcade being blocked by a gun battle. Duvalier declared "we are as firm as a monkey tail" and decided against abdication. However, the Duvaliers made another attempt to depart on 7 February 1986, and this time they succeeded, flying to France on a U.S. Air Force aircraft.

== Exile ==
The Duvaliers settled in France. For a time they lived a luxurious life, but eventually separated on 19 June 1990. Although he formally applied for political asylum, his request was denied by French authorities. Duvalier lost most of his wealth with his 1993 divorce from his wife.

In his years of exile, Duvalier made no known attempts to find employment or gain self-employment, nor did he ever try to get a book written about his experience. "All I know about is politics", he was quoted when asked about the lack of effort. Duvalier did take some courses at a university in France in an effort to sharpen his leadership skills.

A private citizen, named Jacques Samyn, unsuccessfully sued to expel Duvalier as an illegal immigrant (the Duvaliers were never officially granted asylum in France). In 1998, a Haitian-born photographer, Gérald Bloncourt, formed a committee in Paris to bring Duvalier to trial. At the time, the French Ministry of the Interior said that it could not verify whether Duvalier still remained in the country due to the recently enacted Schengen Agreement, which had abolished systematic border controls between France and the other participating countries. However, Duvalier's lawyer Sauveur Vaisse said that his client was still in France and denied that the exiled leader had fallen on hard times.

The 2004 Global Corruption Report listed Duvalier as the sixth-most corrupt world leader – between Slobodan Milošević and Alberto Fujimori – having amassed between US$300 million and US$800 million.

Following the ousting of president Jean-Bertrand Aristide in February 2004, Duvalier announced his intention to return to Haiti to run for president in the 2006 elections for the National Unity Party; however, he did not become a candidate.

While apparently living modestly in exile, Duvalier did have supporters, who founded the François Duvalier Foundation in 2006 to highlight positive aspects of the Duvalier presidency, including the creation of most of Haiti's state institutions and improved access to education for the country's black majority.

On 22–23 September 2007, an address by Duvalier to Haitians was broadcast by radio. Although he said exile had "broken" him, he also said that what he described as the improving fortunes of the National Unity Party had "reinvigorated" him, and he urged readiness among his supporters, without saying whether he intended to return to Haiti. President René Préval rejected Duvalier's apology and, on 28 September, he said that, while Duvalier was constitutionally free to return to Haiti, he would face trial if he did so. Duvalier's radio broadcast address was given in French and not Haitian Creole, the language spoken by the majority of Haitians.

In February 2010, a Swiss court agreed to release more than US$4 million to Duvalier, although the Swiss Foreign Ministry said it would continue to block the release of the money.

Duvalier lived in Paris with Véronique Roy, his longtime companion, until his return to Haiti in late January 2011.

== Return and death ==
On 16 January 2011, during the presidential election campaign, Duvalier returned to Haiti after 25 years. Accompanied by Roy, he flew in from Paris, indicating that he wanted to help: "I'm not here for politics. I'm here for the reconstruction of Haiti", he said. However, many argued that Duvalier returned to Haiti to gain access to the US$4 million frozen in his Swiss bank account. Haiti also claimed this money, arguing that the assets were of a "criminal origin" and should not be returned to Duvalier. Under Swiss law, however, states claiming money in Switzerland have to demonstrate that they have started criminal investigations against offenders holding money in the country. According to an article by Ginger Thompson in The New York Times, "if Mr. Duvalier had been able to slip into the country and then quietly leave without incident ... he may have been able to argue that Haiti was no longer interested in prosecuting him—and that the money should be his." According to Mac McClelland of Mother Jones magazine:

The former dictator was greeted at the Port-au-Prince airport with cheering and celebratory chanting ... The word from Duvalier is that he's come to help his country. According to everyone on the street and on the radio, the Americans and the French conspired to bring him here to upset current president René Préval, who's been accused of fixing his country's recent elections.

On 18 January 2011, he was taken into custody at his hotel by Haitian authorities. He was charged with corruption, theft, and misappropriation of funds committed during his 15-year presidency. He was released but was subject to recall by the court.

On 22 September 2011, legal procedures against him had stalled. He was reported to be living under poorly enforced house arrest, enjoying a life of luxury in a suburb of Port-au-Prince. By 30 January 2012, it was announced that the former president would face charges of corruption, but not of human rights abuses.

After the former president failed to appear for three previously scheduled court hearings, a Haitian judge issued a warrant ordering him to appear before the court 28 February 2013. Duvalier did so and for the first time pleaded not guilty to charges of corruption and human rights abuse.

On 4 October 2014, Duvalier died of a heart attack at the age of 63.

Political offices
Preceded by François Duvalier	President of Haiti; 1971–1986	Succeeded by Henri Namphy
