= Haitian National Police =

National police service of Haiti

Haitian National Police Police Nationale d'Haïti
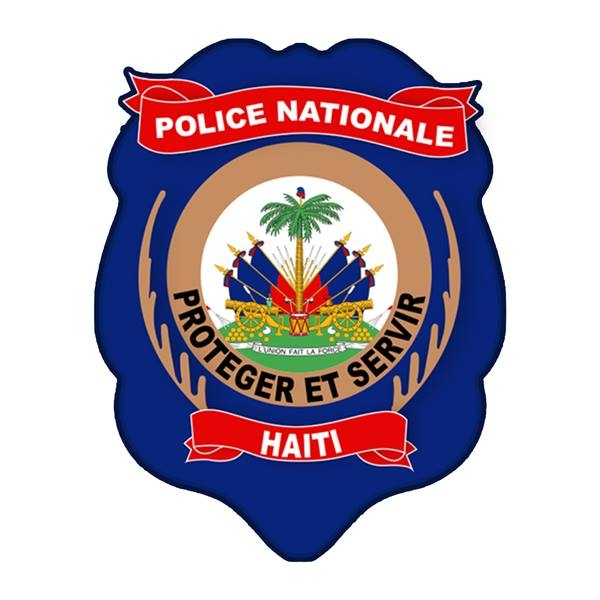
- Common name: Police nationale
- Abbreviation: PNH
- Motto: Proteger et Servir; Protect and Serve

Agency overview
- Formed: June 1995
- Preceding agency: Interim Public Security Force (1994–1995)
- Employees: 13,500 (2025)

Jurisdictional structure
- National agency: Haiti
- Operations jurisdiction: Haiti
- Area: 27,750 km²
- Population: 11.9 million
- Governing body: Cabinet of Haiti
- General nature: Local civilian police

Operational structure
- Headquarters: Port-au-Prince, Haiti
- Minister responsible: Patrick Pelissier, Minister of Justice and Public Security
- Agency executive: Vladimir Paraison (acting), Director-General of the National Police

Facilities
- Cars: Fiat Siena, Dodge Ram, Nissan Frontier, Lenco Bearcat, Toyota Landcruiser, Roschel senator

Website
- Official website (in French)

The Haitian National Police (HNP or PNH; French: Police Nationale d'Haïti, lit. 'National Police of Haiti'; Haitian Creole: Polis Nasyonal Ayiti) is the civil law enforcement agency of Haiti, part of the Ministry of Justice and Public Security. It was created in 1995 to bring the police force under civilian control as required by the Haitian constitution, and is headquartered in Port-au-Prince. In addition to basic policing, its duties include border control, maritime security, and correctional services.

The PNH was established by the 1994 law on the creation of the National Police, after Operation Uphold Democracy restored the administration of President Jean-Bertrand Aristide in September and October 1994. The National Police Academy was opened in January 1995, and its first class graduated in June 1995. An Interim Public Security Force of former soldiers and volunteers from Haitian refugee camps existed until December 1995, when enough police officers completed training and were deployed. The PNH was the only institution responsible for Haiti's internal and external security while the Armed Forces of Haiti were abolished from 1995 until 2017, and is still the main security force.

The PNH is Haiti's first civilian and professional law enforcement agency. However, throughout its existence, the National Police has been understaffed, under-equipped, and had low levels of training and professionalism. After being relatively functional from 1995 to 1997, the force became politicized and involved with drug trafficking. It nearly collapsed during the armed rebellion against Aristide in February 2004. The PNH began to be rebuilt and adopted a reform plan in August 2006. The force was increased from 2,300 officers after the rebellion to just over 9,000 in 2008 and about 13,000 in 2016. During the Haitian economic and political crisis that began in July 2018, the PNH faced mass demonstrations against the government as well as increasing gang activity. Since 2020 the police force has been overwhelmed as allied gangs have taken over most of Port-au-Prince, including locations that are vital for the functioning of the economy and the state.

== History ==
=== 19th and early 20th centuries ===
The Haitian Rural Code of 1865 created a chief-of-section in each rural district that was tasked with supervising the rural police, and was subordinated to the commander of the commune and of the arrondissement. The municipal or communal police answered to city mayors, responsible for communal matters only. The arrondissement police was subordinated to the ministry of war. In the Port-au-Prince Arrondissement, it was headquartered at the National Penitentiary, the country's largest prison. The administrative police, operating in major cities, was based in stations known as commissariats, and answered to the ministry of the interior. The Haitian constitution of 1889 established the Public Force of Haiti, consisting of the Armed Forces, the National Guard, and the police forces. This system was dismantled during the United States occupation of Haiti that began in 1915. In accordance with the treaty signed by the Republic of Haiti and the United States of America on 16 September 1915, the Haitian government would replace the existing structure with a gendarmerie that would be organized and led by American officers.

The Haitian secretary of the interior, Constantin Mayard, signed on 22 January 1916 a notice to all arrondissement commanders announcing that the posts of commune commander and rural chief-of-section have been abolished, and that their post own was reduced to civil functions, with all military and police responsibilities transferred to the Gendarmerie. The change went into effect on 1 February 1916. The old public force was completely dismantled, and police stations were demolished. Initially, the main role of the Gendarmerie was as a police force, despite being a military organization. A Gendarmerie major served as chief of police in Port-au-Prince, assisted by a captain and two lieutenants, with two companies of gendarmes serving as patrol policemen and being rotated each day. From 1920, a Gendarmerie district was organized to serve as a permanent police force in Port-au-Prince. The 4th Company was assigned to the task. From 1923, the 1st Company of gendarmes was given the same assignment in Cap-Haïtien.

The Bureau of Criminal Investigations and Identification (Bureau de Recherche et d'identification des Criminel, BRIC) was created in 1921 as a detective and domestic intelligence force. It operated outside the regular military structure, answering to the highest levels of government. The chiefs-of-section were officially reestablished on 16 December 1922 as the Rural Police of the Gendarmerie, now being under military command. The Gendarmerie was renamed the Guard of Haiti on 24 October 1928, and the constitution of 1932 gave it the responsibility for policing in the cities and the countryside. As of 1931, there were 28 districts of the Guard, two of which were police districts (Port-au-Prince and Cap-Haïtien), separate from the rural police. The 1946 constitution renamed the Guard as the Army of Haiti, and called for the separation of police functions from the military. A law passed on 28 March 1947 for the creation of the Urban and Rural Police, and this measure was also included the constitution of 1950, but was never implemented.

=== Duvalier and military dictatorships ===
The 1950 Haitian coup d'état paved the way for the rise to power of François Duvalier in 1957. The constitution of 1957 called for the separation of the military and the police, and the former were renamed as the Armed Forces of Haiti (FAd'H) by Duvalier on 4 August 1958. Because the main focus of the FAd'H was on internal security, the nine military departments functioned as police districts. There were also military regions of the north, the south, and the Port-au-Prince metropolitan area. The FAd'H controlled the Port-au-Prince police, the only true police force in Haiti, and also the capital's firefighters, the prison system, the customs and immigration program, and the counter-narcotics program. FAd'H personnel assigned to police work received no police training, and they frequently conducted warrantless arrests, including in return for bribes. The lowest level of military command, military section chiefs, were responsible for security in rural areas, and were similar to sheriffs. They were also the main government representatives in rural areas, and functioned as judges, prosecutors, and tax collectors. There were 565 rural section chiefs, and each of them had as many as 100 deputies. They were known to extort, intimidate, detain, and arrest people, to prevent opposition to the regime.

In 1959, the Duvalier regime began recruiting young men from the slums of Port-au-Prince into a paramilitary organization parallel to the military and police, the Tonton Macoutes, formally known as the Civilian Militia (Milice Civile). In 1962 it was renamed as the Volunteers for National Security (Volontaires de la Sécurité Nationale, VSN). The VSN extended from Port-au-Prince into the countryside and became an intelligence and secret police organization controlled by the presidency, with 9,000 official members by 1986 and many additional informants. The organization had an important role for state security in the Duvalier regime. VSN members were not paid and resorted to extortion and petty crime to make a living. The Haitian security forces became less brutal after Jean-Claude Duvalier came to power in 1971 and made an effort to open up Haiti to the outside world, which meant restraining VSN abuses to a degree. He also created the Leopard Corps with US assistance as a separate security unit, to lessen his dependence on the military and the VSN. In addition to the 700-member Leopard Corps, the capital region also had the 1,300-member Presidential Guard, to provide protection for the president, and the 750-member Dessalines Battalion, a light infantry unit. The Duvalier regime also renamed the BRIC as the Anti-Gang Research and Investigation Service (Service d'Investigation et de Recherche Anti-Gang), and it remained as a military police unit.

When protests against the Duvalier regime began in 1983 and continued up to 1986, he attempted to use the VSN and the limited police capabilities to stop them, but was unsuccessful. The reported brutality of the VSN in suppressing the opposition further delegitimized the Duvalier regime. The Haitian Army increasingly began to turn against the government, and in February 1986 the generals organized a political transition that removed Jean-Claude Duvalier. An interim military junta led by Lt. Gen. Henri Namphy officially disbanded the VSN but failed to stop the activity of its former members, and this led to an outbreak of more violence as people retaliated against the group. The military's failure to subdue the former VSN and hold elections in 1987 and 1988 led the Haitian public to turn against the interim government. In 1986 the Anti-Gang Service had some of its intelligence functions divested into a National Intelligence Service (Service d'Intelligence Nationale), under the Ministry of Interior. Although the 1987 constitution called for a separate police force and police academy under the Ministry of Justice, the military never implemented this. Former VSN agents were able to infiltrate the FAd'H and the Port-au-Prince police.

The 1988 Haitian coup d'état brought to power Lt. Gen. Prosper Avril, who made an effort to crack down on the abuses committed by security forces, but the various military and paramilitary formations continued to misuse their power against the people. Avril was forced into exile by US pressure in March 1990, and free elections held nine months later led to the victory of Jean-Bertrand Aristide, who was inaugurated in February 1991. Aristide had an ambitious reform program, which included the abolition of rural military section chiefs to reduce the power of the military in the provinces. His administration was overthrown in the September 1991 Haitian coup d'état, which was backed by military and economic leaders. Lt. Gen. Raoul Cédras led the military junta, which appointed a civilian puppet government while keeping the real power. Since 1986, soldiers who went unpaid due to foreign aid being cut off started resorting to robbery and home invasions to make a living, and later became known as the zenglendo. The Cédras regime began providing protection to the loosely organized gangs of zenglendo and sometimes encouraged them to commit their crimes against pro-Aristide neighborhoods. They were responsible for intimidation and extrajudicial executions, and because they were "attached" to the military, they came to be referred to as "attachés." They occasionally worked with street gangs and vigilante groups, causing entire communities to devolve into violence. Port-au-Prince military region and police chief Lt. Col. Joseph-Michel François reportedly organized the "attachés."

Military discipline broke down as economic pressure on the regime increased. The presence of armed gangs, the lack of money to pay the salaries of military personnel, and the increasing involvement of many officers in drug trafficking to make a living contributed to this. In July 1993, the Governors Island Accord signed between Aristide and Cédras included the constitutionally mandated separation of the military and the police. The regime's "attachés" were assisted in their abuses by rural military section chiefs, and from 1993 by a new group called the Front for the Advancement and Progress of Haïti (Front Révolutionnaire pour l'Avancement et le Progres d'Haïti, FRAPH). The FRAPH, whose leaders included Emmanuel Constant and Louis-Jodel Chamblain, was responsible for the murders of the activist Antoine Izméry and the justice minister Guy Malary in 1993, and the Raboteau massacre in 1994. When US and Canadian military personnel attempted to enter Haiti in October 1993 under the Governors Island Accord, they were discouraged by the FRAPH, and the UN embargo of the military regime in Haiti resumed. "Popular organizations" emerged that called for Aristide's return, especially among the urban poor who made up Aristide's base of support. They armed themselves and engaged in daily firefights with the FAd'H and the FRAPH.

=== Interim Public Security Force ===
After the failure of the Governors Island Accord, the US eventually intervened in September 1994 under Operation Uphold Democracy. Cédras and the junta agreed to resign and go into exile in a last-minute negotiation led by Jimmy Carter. The next day, 19 September 1994, US-led Multinational Force (MNF) troops landed in Haiti. Aristide, who returned to Haiti in October 1994 to resume his presidential term, quickly began taking steps to create a police force separate from the military, which then had a strength of 8,000 men, half of whom were assigned to police duties. The FAd'H underwent an upheaval from late 1994 to early 1995. Aristide demobilized much of the army in December 1994, only retaining about 3,400 troops to serve in the Interim Public Security Force (IPSF), while the rest were sent to join an internationally-sponsored job training program, or to follow other pursuits. The interim police were a temporary measure to fill the security vacuum until the permanent police force could be trained and deployed. Aristide began revoking military officers' commissions in December 1994, and that was followed on 20 February 1995 by the dismissals of many officers above the rank of major, including Commander-in-Chief of the Armed Forces Brig. Gen. Bernardin Poisson and interim police force commander Col. Pierre Neptune. Maj. Dany Toussaint, Aristide's military advisor and former commander of the Pétion-Ville police district, became the military's highest ranking officer and was appointed as commander of the IPSF.

US officials had started making plans for the creation of both the interim and permanent police of Haiti in 1992. The US initially wanted to maintain a Haitian military, and to only use trained Haitian soldiers as members of the interim police, not civilians. Costa Rican president Óscar Arias proposed that the Haitian military be abolished, and this was eventually supported by the US administration of President Bill Clinton after some debate. The US immediately assisted Haiti with creating the interim police. By the end of January 1995, US officials working with the Haitian military selected 3,400 former soldiers to serve in the IPSF, including 200 officers up to the rank of major. They were given six days of training that emphasized respect for human rights before returning to their units, where they served under international police monitors. There were 960 monitors in total, led by New York City police commissioner Raymond Kelly, who answered to the MNF commander. The US Justice Department's International Criminal Investigative Training Assistance Program (ICITAP) provided the training.

After some disagreements between the US and Haitian governments on who would be part of the IPSF during February and March 1995, the organization was ultimately set at a size of 2,700 personnel who had been vetted for past human rights violations and received ICITAP training. On 31 March 1995, with the withdrawal of Multinational Force and its replacement by the United Nations Mission in Haiti (UNMIH), the international police monitors were replaced by the 900-strong United Nations Civilian Police (CIVPOL). Aristide dissolved the Armed Forces of Haiti on 28 April 1995, which he announced after a meeting with Costa Rican president Arias. The international police monitors and CIVPOL tried to make the IPSF a viable force, with the former working from 12 regional bases and conducting visits to 120 locations a week. However, the IPSF suffered from shortages of equipment and low morale. Because of their association with the former military that had become notorious for human rights violations, the interim police were commonly referred to as "soldiers" and were seen as illegitimate in many areas. In some cases interim police officers were attacked by locals, and only went out on patrol accompanied by US troops or international monitors. Their authority was also undermined by the fact that they only had their roles temporarily. Some IPSF officers were removed for corruption or excessive use of force.

The Haitian government and its allies sought to address the ineffectiveness of the IPSF and rising crime rates (which had increased by 200%) by deploying about 900 civilians recruits from the Haitian refugee camps at the Guantanamo Naval Base. They had been selected in the weeks before the September 1994 operation. The Guatanamo recruits wore different uniforms from the former soldiers and their inclusion reportedly improved Haitians' perception of the interim police. However, the US officials in Port-au-Prince subordinated the Guantanamo recruits to the former soldiers and prevented them from carrying weapons. Their roles were limited to traffic control and helping out at police stations, and they were deployed to Port-au-Prince, Port-de-Paix, Cap Haïtien, Fort Liberté, Hinche, Gonaïves, and St. Marc. On 7 February 1995, 84 recruits of Haitian descent arrived in Haiti from Canada, after having undergone training at the Royal Canadian Mounted Police Academy in Regina during the winter of 1994. From February 1995, there was also an effort to establish "vigilance brigades" as a neighborhood watch serving alongside the interim police, in an attempt address rising urban and rural crime.

=== Haitian National Police since 1995 ===
==== Creation and early service (1995–1997) ====
The parliament of Haiti passed the law creating the Haitian National Police (Police Nationale d'Haïti, PNH) on 29 November 1994, and it was promulgated on 23 December 1994. Following the passage of the law, the government received 45,000 applications for the permanent force, of which 375 were selected to begin as the first training class. A series of four-month courses were instituted so that new officers could begin gradually phasing out the IPSF starting from June 1995. The National Police Academy was opened at the Camp d'Application in January 1995, located in Pétion-Ville area of Port-au-Prince. The US Justice Department's ICITAP took the lead in building the new force, with French and Canadian assistance at the police academy. Although longer training was recommended by police experts, the need to fill the security vacuum led to four-month courses. The initial several classes were also trained at Fort Leonard Wood, Missouri, where they were mainly taught practical skills. The American, French, and Canadian instructors focused on arrest, patrol, and investigative techniques, while Haitian lawyers were brought in to teach the recruits about Haitian law and the constitution. The top 10% of each class, about 40 recruits, were selected to train for supervisory positions, and some were selected for additional investigative training to serve in the Judicial Police. The training was later extended to nine months.

The first class of the academy began training at the Camp d'Application on 3 February 1995. Adrien Rameau was appointed as the first director-general of the National Police in May 1995, shortly before the graduation of the first class on 4 June 1995. The first PNH officers began their service in July 1995. The graduation of the ninth class on 17 February 1996 brought the force to its first target strength of 5,201 personnel. IPSF officers were gradually demobilized as more PNH officers completed their training and were deployed. The members of the interim police that had been rated as the worst by international monitors became the first to be removed. Aristide dissolved the IPSF by presidential decree on 6 December 1995, and its remaining personnel, consisting of 130 ex-FAd'H officers and 827 "Guantanamo police," were incorporated into the PNH. Many of the former IPSF officers went on to become members of the PNH's specialized units, such as the National Palace General Security Unit, the Ministerial Security Corps, the Company for Intervention and Maintaining Public Order (riot police, abbreviated CIMO), the Intervention Group of the Haitian National Police (SWAT, abbreviated GIPNH), or the Counter-Narcotics Trafficking Unit (abbreviated BLTS).

Initially, the PNH was seen favorably by the Haitian public. The PNH has been described as Haiti's first civilian and professional law enforcement agency, representing a break from the historical reliance on the military for internal security. It became the only institution responsible for Haiti's internal and external security, and had roles beyond basic policing: border protection, maritime security, guarding prisons, and quasi-military tasks. A new civilian authority was created to manage the prison system, the National Penitentiary Administration, and it was part of the National Police. However, the new force faced limitations. It mostly consisted of very young policemen with almost no experienced leadership to guide them, and they had to work with a shortage of basic equipment and very poor accommodations. This contributed to a lack of discipline, leading to incidents of excessive use of force. The majority of police commanders had no specialized training other than a two-day ICITAP orientation course, and having no official regulations until 2 February 1996 caused ignorance among commanders about what responses were appropriate for each infraction. Some created their own systems of discipline. As of March 1996, the average PNH officer had two months of experience and had to work in harsh conditions.

Gang violence in the slums of Port-au-Prince, particularly in Cité Soleil, spread to other parts of the city and into the countryside. Much of the crime consisted of robberies and kidnappings, and was associated with five or six gangs. Vigilante groups also arose, sometimes with government approval. PNH officers went on foot and mobile patrols, received complaints from the public, and investigated criminal cases. They also provided security during the 1995 Haitian general election. Although many of the new officers serving from 1995 to 1997 "performed admirably" and were "generally well motivated and willing to work," the police was involved in the deaths of at least 46 Haitians by the start of 1997, of which only a minority of cases were considered to be legitimate uses of deadly force in self-defense. The majority of the deaths caused by officers were considered extrajudicial executions or excessive force. In a notable incident in March 1996, police officers summarily executed six men in Cité Soleil. The PNH's Office of the Inspector General, led by Luc Joseph Euscher, dismissed 75 personnel for misconduct. In August 1996, the police headquarters in Port-au-Prince was attacked by former soldiers, who killed one civilian. Having the highest proportion of former FAd'H personnel, the specialized units of the PNH were the most paramilitary, and operated with autonomy from PNH control during 1995 and much of 1996. These police tactical units served on the front-line of the fight against gangs, performing sweeps of the hyper-violent slums of Port-au-Prince and arresting individual gang-members. Although the paramilitary operations had public support, their impact was limited.

==== Politicization and breakdown (1997–2004) ====
Aristide gave up power to elected president René Préval in 1996, but from 1997 to 1999 the government remained deadlocked because the ruling party Lavalas could not agree on a prime minister. Aristide formed his own party Fanmi Lavalas while preparing to run for the 2000 Haitian presidential election. From 1997, pro-Aristide political forces began appointing PNH leaders out of loyalty to Aristide, and the organization ignored violence by pro-Aristide gangs called chimères, which originated from the popular organizations. During 1997, more than 20 people were killed by the police in disputed circumstances. The Haitian Coast Guard and the counter-narcotics unit began to be deployed starting from that year. By early 1998, activity by the PNH and its visibility to the public continued to increase, with more patrols, anti-gang operations, and seizures of drugs. The latter included the seizure of 650 kilograms of cocaine at the Toussaint Louverture International Airport. The PNH reached a strength of 6,500 in early 1998, but it was reduced to 6,000 by late 1999 because of dismissals. By November 1999, a total of 1,000 police officers had been dismissed for corruption or other misconduct. Inspector General Luc Joseph Euscher was credited for removing officers responsible for violations, along with state secretary Robert Manuel and Director-General Pierre Denizé.

The limitations of the PNH contributed to making Haiti a major transit point for Colombian smugglers moving cocaine into the United States. The PNH's Counter-Narcotics Trafficking Unit had just 25 members, and no radar or helicopters. The Coast Guard had less than ten boats to patrol the coastline, most of which had been confiscated from Colombian drug traffickers. Some Haitian MPs alleged that police officers aligned with Aristide were involved in the drug trade. Inspector General Euscher was removed in April 2000, after investigating police officials involved in the drug trade, and a replacement was not appointed until February 2001. The US limited intelligence sharing with the PNH due to concerns about the agency's corruption, and the involvement of police officers and government officials in the drug trade. In July 2000, retired US general and drug policy advisor Barry McCaffrey said that "the ability of the noncorrupt Haitian law enforcement and customs authorities to combat this is diminishing rapidly." Aristide returned to power in February 2001, after the November 2000 presidential election, and took away what political independence the PNH had left. In March 2001, Aristide appointed a new director-general of the PNH, Jean Nesly Lucien, who immediately removed Mario Andrésol, the director of the Judicial Police who had been responsible for imprisoning corrupt officials and Colombian drug traffickers.

Political violence flared up after the presidential and parliamentary elections of 2000, amidst the backdrop of a declining economy, a depreciating currency, skyrocketing unemployment. Opposition to Lavalas coalesced as the Convergence Démocratique coalition. On 20 June 2001, Aristide reiterated his "zero tolerance" policy towards street violence in a speech at the National Police Academy, which appeared to endorse extrajudicial executions. After the launch of the zero tolerance policy, heavy handed policing increased, with numerous cases of police intimidation, recklessness, killings, and disappearances. The PNH also began to recruit "attachés" who were not police officers or graduates of the police academy, but committed acts of violence on behalf of police station chiefs, particularly at Delmas 33, Carrefour, Cité Soleil, Port-au-Prince, Pétion-Ville, Gonaives, Cap-Haitien, and Hinche. On 28 July 2001, a group of men in former army uniforms attacked a police station in Pétion-Ville before occupying the National Police Academy for several hours. Three police officers were killed there. The group then escaped, and attacked police stations in the central Haitian cities of Mirebalais, Belladère and Hinche before disappearing. Mario Andrésol was accused of responsibility for the attack and arrested. The opposition claimed that Aristide was using the attack as a pretext to expand his movement's control over the National Police, which many Lavalas supporters saw as more aligned with the US than with the Aristide administration.

Throughout 2001 armed men were responsible for acts of intimidation against CD, and in November 2001, a demonstrator from the party who was arrested in Plaisance died at a police station. On 17 December 2001, a heavily armed group attacked the National Palace, initially meeting no resistance before being forced to flee. An OAS commission later concluded that the attack occurred with the complicity of National Police personnel. The government called it an attempted coup, while the opposition claimed it was staged by the government. A former soldier involved in the attack later said it was a coup attempt, with Guy Philippe as one of the conspirators. On that same day, heavily armed pro-Aristide gangs targeted opposition parties with violence in Port-au-Prince, Croix-des-Bouquets, Cap-Haïtien, Les Cayes, Gonaïves, Grande-Rivière-du-Nord, Jacmel, Jérémie and Petit-Goâve. The Popular Organization for the Development of Raboteau, which became known as the Cannibal Army, was responsible for the attacks that occurred in Gonaïves. Amiot Métayer, the leader of the group, was arrested by the National Police on 3 July 2002 for his role. On 2 August 2002, he and other inmates were broken out of prison in Gonaïves by the Cannibal Army, which overwhelmed the police and also burned down other government buildings. A notable case of police brutality took place in December 2002, when three brothers were arrested in the Carrefour area of Port-au-Prince and were executed by the police. An investigation resulted in the firing of a commissioner and three officers.

In March 2003, with public confidence in the PNH "hitting new lows," and after pressure from the OAS, Lucien was replaced as director-general by Jean Claude Jean-Baptiste. His appointment was concerning to human rights groups because of his involvement in the murder of Sylvio Claude, a pastor who led the opposition Haitian Christian Democratic Party. After international pressure, Jean-Baptiste was replaced in June by Jean-Robert Faveur, who stayed in his positions for several days before resigning and fleeing to the US due to government intimidation and interference in his decisions. He was replaced by the judge Jocelyne Pierre. Around this time, the PNH had up to 3,500 officers. Throughout the year, violence between pro- and anti-Aristide gangs in northern Haiti continued to escalate. Métayer was murdered, and his mutilated body was discovered in St. Marc on 23 September 2003. His brother Buteur took over the Cannibal Army, renamed it the Artibonite Resistance Front (Front de Resistance de l'Artibonite, FRA), and made it even more opposed to Aristide. Meanwhile, anti-government protests by college students, which had begun at the State University of Haiti in August 2002, were subjected to PNH and gang attacks. One such attack on student protestors that occurred in the fall of 2003 became the "turning point," increasing calls for Aristide's resignation.

The FRA waged a campaign of terrorist attacks across northern Haiti between September 2003 and February 2004 that left "scores" of dead and hundreds injured. On 5 February 2004, the FRA launched an attack on the PNH in Gonaïves, took the police station from the outnumbered and outgunned police officers, and consolidated its control over the city. Buteur Métayer went on radio to call for a national uprising against Fanmi Lavalas and the National Police, which by then was seen as loyal to Aristide. A host of rebel groups emerged, including former soldiers living in exile in the Dominican Republic, from where they had been launching attacks on Haitian police officers since November 2002. Calling themselves the New Army, they were led by Louis-Jodel Chamblain and former police officer Guy Philippe. The group took Cap-Haïtien on 23 February. Having secured the north, they moved into the central plateau department on their way towards the capital, looting and destroying provincial police stations as they did so. Some police officers fought the insurgency, while others joined it or fled and went into exile. In Port-au-Prince, the government prepared for a siege, with its main district being protected by the PNH's well-equipped paramilitary units—CIMO, GIPNH, and the Anti-Gang Service (SAG). Chimères mobilized by the government attacked opposition members, and the PNH fired into crowds to break up the fighting, in some cases being attacked and forced to flee.

==== Reconstruction and reform (2004–2010) ====
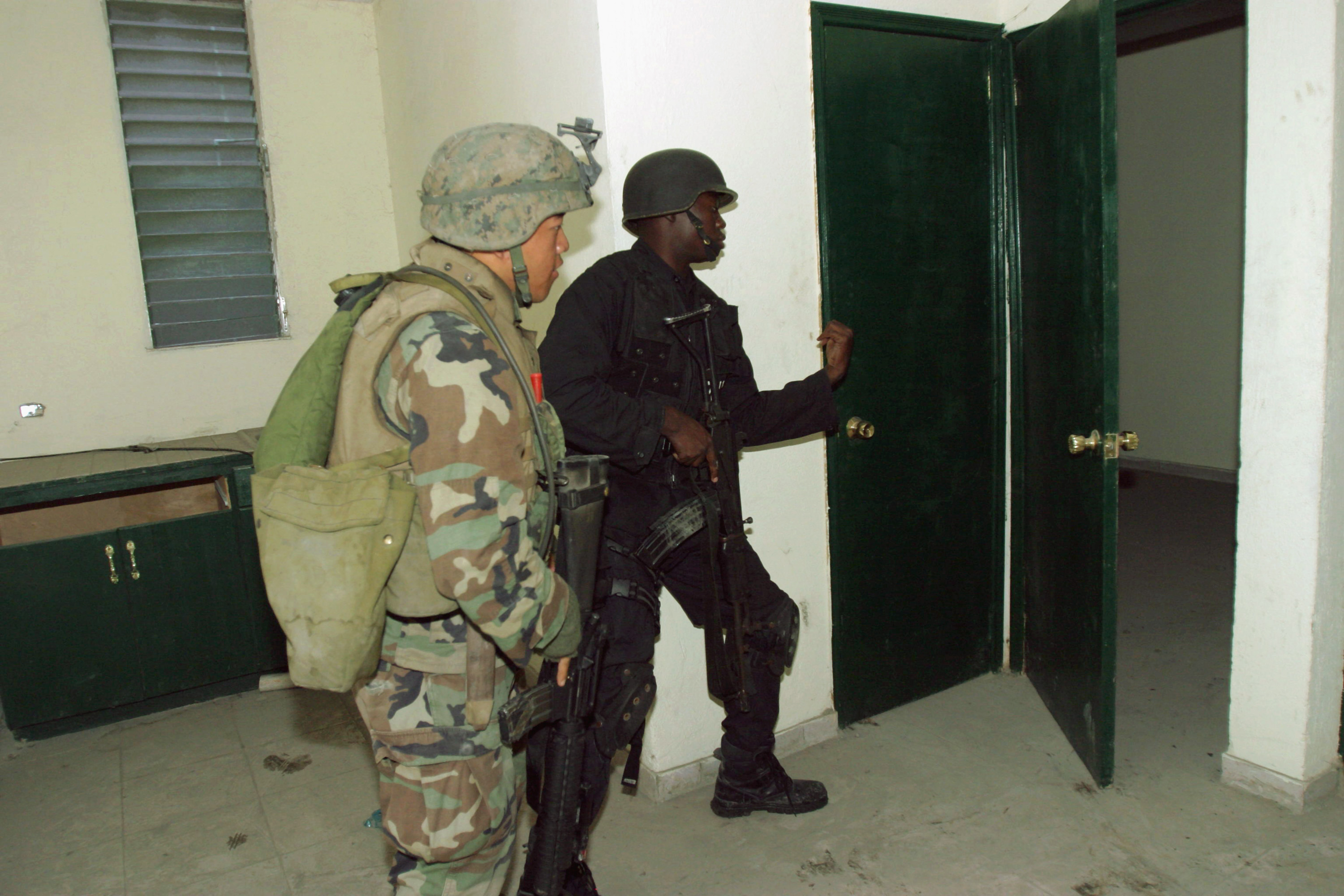
A PNH Intervention Group officer and a US marine raid an apartment complex in Port-au-Prince, March 2004

On the evening of 29 February 2004, the US and France pressured Aristide to resign and go into exile, averting a battle in Port-au-Prince. His replacement in the Haitian transitional government, Boniface Alexandre, requested foreign assistance, and a Multinational Interim Force began to deploy. US, Canadian, and French troops started to arrive in Port-au-Prince under what later became known as Operation Secure Tomorrow. The government faced the task of rebuilding the PNH and restoring legal authority outside of Port-au-Prince, the only part of country where it had control, though in early March 2004 even much of the capital was in a state of "violent anarchy." Armed groups equipped with machetes, whips, semi-automatic handguns, assault rifles, combat-grade shotguns, and Uzi submachineguns roamed the streets. An estimated 500 people would be killed during the violence in Port-au-Prince between the 2004 coup and 2006. Gangs included former popular organizations, some which were pro- or anti-Aristide; and gangs of criminals, which were often tied to international organized crime, corrupt police officials, or former military elements. The gang warfare was centered on Cité Soleil and adjacent neighborhoods, and to a lesser extent along the north-south National Road 1. Outside the capital, Gonaïves was home to the FRA, and smaller, less active groups were present in Cap-Haïtien, St. Marc, and the northern peninsula. Ex-FAd'H elements were most prominent in the Centre department and Hinche, while international organized crime was most active in the southern peninsula, especially in Jacmel, Les Cayes, and Port Salut.

On 4 March 2004, Coast Guard commander Léon Charles was appointed by Alexandre as director-general of the National Police, which by then had become a "demoralized and discredited force," down to about 2,300 officers. In northern Haiti, the PNH had been reduced to just 50 officers. Charles began reorganizing the police in Port-au-Prince while working in coordination with US marines, and working together to start confiscating illegal weapons. On 20 April, the PNH launched a recruitment drive, and some police officers also began to return. The MIF troops and the PNH conducted joint patrols, expanding their presence, and in some areas they made deals to coexist with armed groups and reduce violence. The presence of the MIF improved stability and allowed some return to relative normalcy, but crime levels remained high. By mid-May 2004, the National Police Academy had received 35,000 applications, and some ex-FAd'H soldiers were incorporated into the force. In June, the United Nations Stabilisation Mission in Haiti (MINUSTAH) took over from the MIF to continue the mission, which involved helping professionalize the PNH. By that point the PNH had been increased to 2,500 officers, 70% of which were on duty at any given time. However, a significant number of officers had ties to gangs. After the Aristide years and the uprising, 200 commissariats (police stations) needed rebuilding, 90% of radio-communication equipment was destroyed, and the number of functional vehicles had been reduced to 150 in the departments and less than 100 in Port-au-Prince.

On 30 September 2004, pro-Aristide gangs launched "Operation Baghdad," killing about 50 officers and beheading some of them. During the year 2004, which also marked Haiti's bicentennial of independence from France, the transitional government failed to reestablish its authority across the entire country. Mario Andrésol returned from exile in the US and took over as director-general of the National Police on 24 July 2005. He declared that 25% of the force was corrupt, and that it needed thorough changes. In February 2006, the new administration of Rene Preval announced a police reform plan, developed by Andrésol, presidential advisor Robert Manuel (also returned from exile), and state secretary Luc Euscher. Adopted in August 2006, it involved increasing the force to 9,000 by 2008 and 14,000 by 2011. The PNH needed 18,000 officers to meet the international standard of two officers for every 1,000 people, but the 14,000 goal was considered the most that could be achieved in the circumstances. In late 2006, different sources put the size of the force from 5,783 to 7,000.

After 2004, kidnappings developed from a quick way to make revenue for gangs into more sophisticated operations. They were centered on Port-au-Prince, but also occurred in mid-sized cities. The anti-kidnapping unit (CCE) of the Judicial Police was considered relatively professional but not large enough. Operations by the PNH and MINUSTAH in Cité Soleil during early 2007 led to the arrest or death of many gang leaders, but other members scattered, and instability spread out among the slums of the capital. Smaller community-based gangs were formed in the slums, and others had links to organized crime (including ex-military or police, or Haitian deportees from the United States), which continued to be active. The National Police was increased to 9,127 officers as of August 2008. By then, the PNH made progress on reforms, increased its visibility in Port-au-Prince with patrols and roadblocks, raised morale among officers, and improved its perception among Haitians. However, it continued to face problems with internal corruption. Small rural substations were tasked with policing large areas with almost no budget or vehicles, and officers often tried to avoid serving outside Port-au-Prince. In December 2008 the PNH unraveled a criminal network in Port-au-Prince, which led to reduced kidnappings during 2009 and an improvement overall public security.

==== Post-earthquake developments (2010–2020) ====
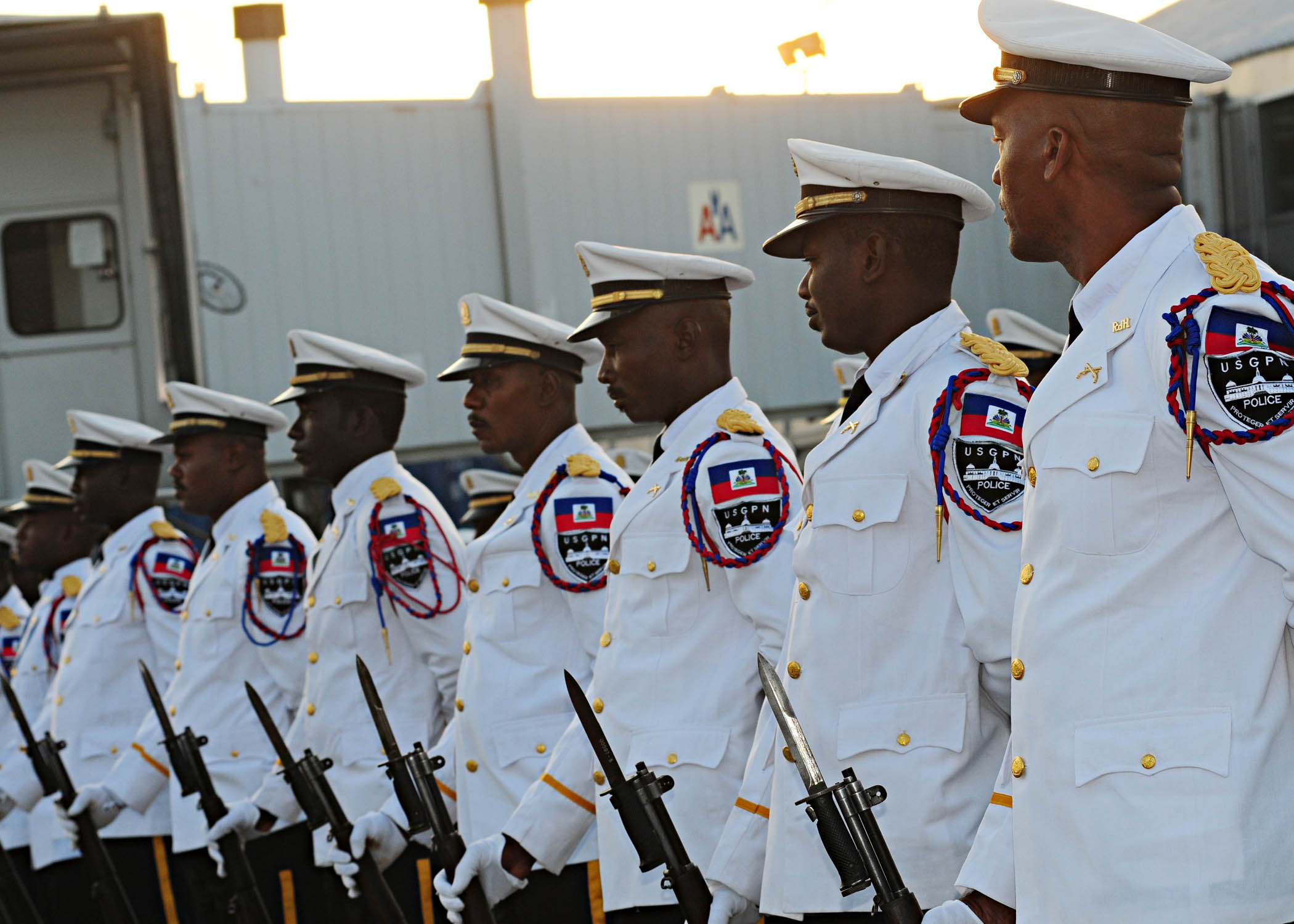
National Palace General Security Unit officers at the Toussaint Louverture International Airport, February 2010

The 12 January 2010 Haiti earthquake was also a setback for the development of the National Police, particularly in Port-au-Prince and the Ouest department, the region where the capital is located. Immediate losses included 80 officers killed and 210 injured. Besides its formal headquarters, the PNH had 253 stations and substations in the Ouest department, of which 39 were non-functional before the earthquake. After 12 January 2010, the number of unusable facilities increased to 94, including the central headquarters. As of twenty months after the earthquake, Director-General Mario Andrésol still had his office in a shipping container donated by Germany. Officers had to be deployed to the capital from elsewhere, reducing the already limited police presence in the departments. Prior to the earthquake, 80% of PNH resources and materiel were in the Port-au-Prince metropolitan area, and 16% were outside of the Ouest department. Most of the violence was concentrated in Port-au-Prince, and the PNH had additional responsibilities, having to protect properties from looters and maintain order in the displaced person camps. About 5,000 inmates, over half of Haiti's prison population, were able to escape, including many gang members that had been arrested during the 2007 PNH–MINUSTAH operation. After having declined in 2009, crime was back up during 2010 and 2011. By August 2011, the total size of the PNH had increased to around 10,000, with 3,500 officers having entered the force since the 2006 reform started.

Following the earthquake, international assistance focused on strengthening the PNH's ability to control the land and sea borders of Haiti. Fifteen police stations in the border region were built or refurbished, and Canadian funding was provided to build a new Coast Guard base at Les Cayes, to patrol a section of coastline that could not be easily reached from the Port-au-Prince or Cap-Haïtien bases and was along a drug-trafficking route. Although the PNH's performance gradually improved during 2012, it was still incapable of operating without UN support, and as of early 2013, violence in the slums of Port-au-Prince continued to increase, in contrast to the gradual decline from 2006 to 2009. In 2012, the PNH was described as one of the best functioning institutions in Haiti, and adopted a plan to raise the force to 15,000 officers by 2016. That year, Andrésol completed his third term as PNH director-general and was replaced by Godson Aurélus in August 2012. With assistance from the United States, the BLTS, the PNH's counter-drug trafficking unit, was expanded from 40 to 200 members. Overall, and additional 3,300 officers were trained and commissioned by January 2015. As of late 2016, the PNH had 13,100 officers. The Armed Forces of Haiti were restored in 2017, but the PNH remained the country's main security force. By that year, which was also when President Jovenel Moïse began his term in office, Haiti was the poorest country in the Western Hemisphere and still suffered from the effects of the earthquake. There were multiple neighborhoods in the capital beyond the traditionally dangerous Cité Soleil and Bel Air that were considered "no-go zones" for the National Police.

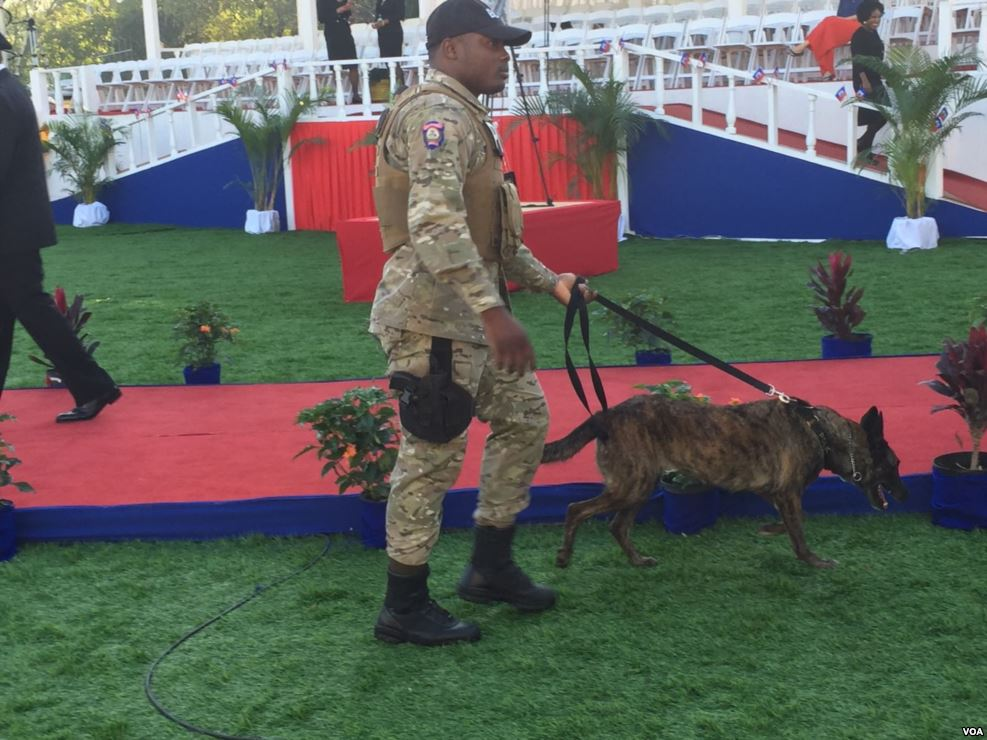
A police dog handler at the inauguration of Jovenel Moïse, 2017

The country experienced an increasing political and economic crisis, particularly after the July 2018 fuel price hike announced by Moïse, which set off mass demonstrations. Haitian police officers allegedly collaborated with gangs to break up protests, allowing them to massacre protestors in the Port au-Prince neighborhoods of La Saline, Bel Air and Cité Soleil, which were seen as opposed to Moïse. On 13 November 2018, at least 71 people were killed after PNH forces entered La Saline, which the police officer and future gang leader Jimmy Chérizier ("Barbecue") participated in. Around this time, the government encouraged efforts by various gang leaders to create an alliance, believing it would make the gangs easier to negotiate with. The US Treasury Department sanctioned two Moïse administration officials for allegedly providing weapons that were used in the La Saline massacre. The PNH also managed protests in Les Cayes and Cap-Haïtien. The Port-au-Prince Bar Association called for the arrest of several senior police officials in late 2018 after accusing them of police brutality against lawyers. Moïse worked to concentrate political power in the presidency during 2019. That year, there was a police response to "country lock" anti-government demonstrations that blocked some of the main roads in the country, which included the use of CIMO and UDMO riot police units, the Search and Intervention Brigade (BRI), and the BLTS. Haitian police officers worked to dismantle road blocks, maintain a presence on the roads, evacaute the wounded, arrest violent demonstrators, and organize crowd control. Between 2018 and 2020, about 240 civilians were killed in attacks on neighborhoods involving the police.

==== Renewed conflict (2020–present) ====
Starting in 2020, Haiti's 200 or so gangs emerged from poor neighborhoods to occupy larger parts of Port-au-Prince, including areas that are crucial for the functioning of the nation's economy and justice system. There was a resurgence in kidnappings and gang violence in general, leading to the dismissal of PNH director-general Rameau Normil and his replacement with former director-general Léon Charles in November 2020. In June 2020, nine powerful gangs and several smaller ones formed the G9 gang alliance, with "Barbecue" Chérizier as their spokesman. Rival gangs formed another alliance, Gpèp, which fought against G9. In June 2021, gangs captured the Martissant area, cutting off Port-au-Prince from southern Haiti. Over half of the capital was under gang control, and the entire southern half of Haiti was cut off from the rest of the country by gang roadblocks. While the police attempted to retake Martissant, the gangs advanced in the north and east. The assassination of Jovenel Moïse in July 2021 created a political power vacuum that was used by gangs to expand their power, as they became autonomous from state patronage and more bold in confronting the police. State authority began to collapse. In October, Charles was replaced by Frantz Elbé amidst increasing criticism for the worsening security situation. Charles, who oversaw the Judicial Police report on the assassination of Moïse, was later among several officials charged by a Haitian government investigation for allegedly being involved in a conspiracy against Moïse.

Gangs overtook some of the main courthouses in Port-au-Prince during the summer of 2022, after launching simultaneous, coordinated and organized attacks in multiple areas. By this point, the limited capability of the National Police to respond to threats across the capital was overwhelmed, despite its ongoing efforts. There were protests and increased gang violence when acting prime minister Ariel Henry announced a cut to fuel subsidies on 11 September 2022. Hours later, G9 coalition gangs blockaded the Varreux terminal, the country's main oil terminal in northern Port-au-Prince, paralyzing the national economy. On 3 November, the National Police retook the Varreux oil terminal following two days of fighting, restoring the distribution of fuel in Port-au-Prince. However, overall security continued to get worse. By November 2022, the situation deteriorated to the point where gangs were openly roaming the streets and attacking police officers in police stations. The police was unable to respond even to the most serious crimes. That month, National Police Academy director Harington Rigaud was shot and killed in front of the Judicial Academy in Pétion-Ville, which is right next to the police academy. By the end of the year the PNH had less than 13,000 personnel because of attrition, and out of those, less than 9,000 were on duty at any given time.

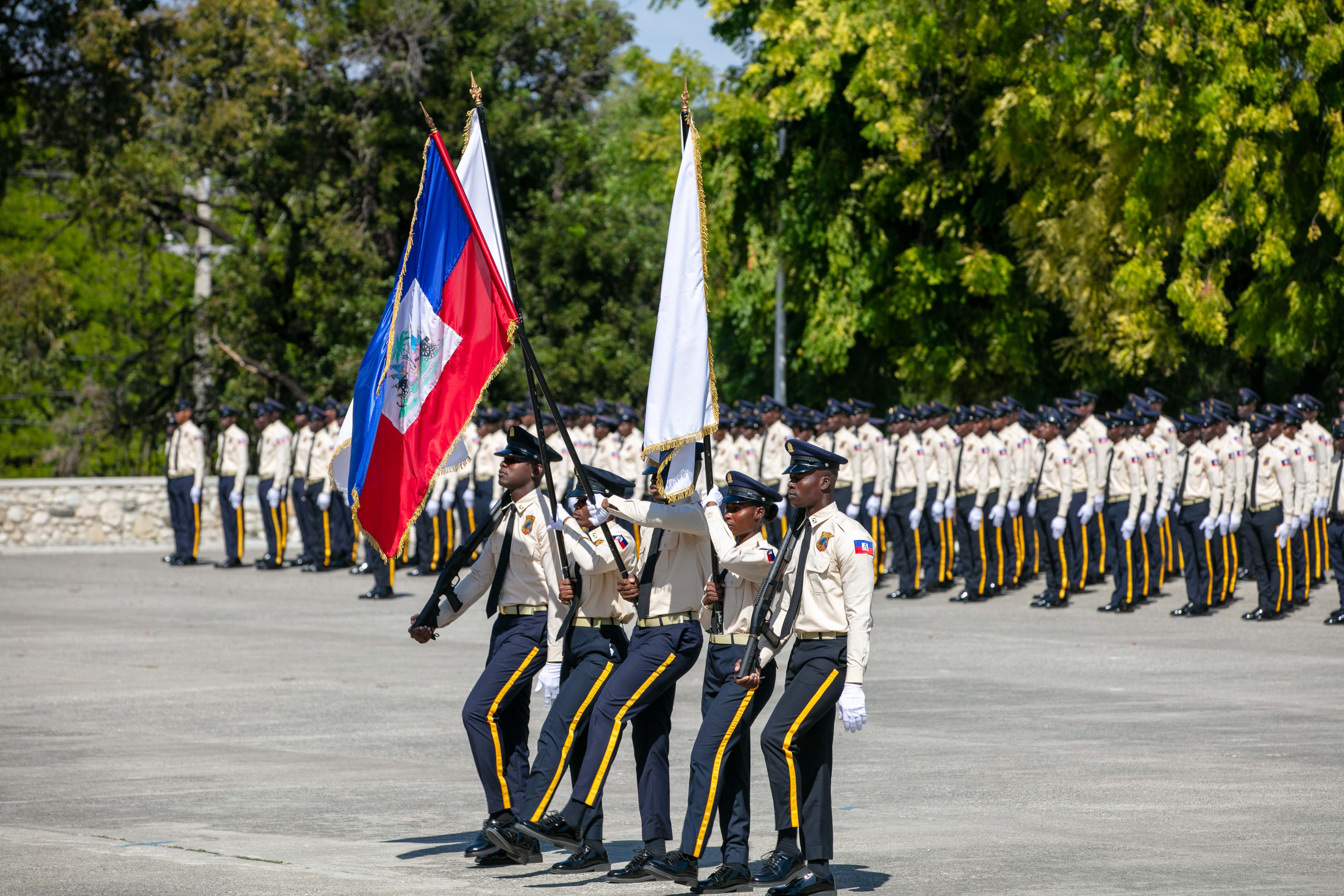
The graduation of new police officers in January 2025

From late 2022 until early 2024, there were multiple attempted truces between rival gangs in G9 and Gpèp. After Kenya's August 2023 announcement that it would lead a Multinational Security Support Mission (MSS) in Haiti, Chérizier announced a month later the creation of the Viv Ansanm alliance between G9 and Gpèp. As of December 2023, the PNH had 13,196 personnel. In January 2024, the main police union SYNAPOHA announced that the PNH had lost 3,300 officers over the previous three years, most of whom were fired for abandoning their posts. In February 2024, when Henry went on a foreign trip to finalize the terms of the MSS deployment, the Viv Ansanm launched coordinated attacks the completely overwhelmed the PNH. The main airport and seaport were closed, 4,700 prison inmates were released, and there was damage to the presidential palace, police stations, and the police academy. The capital was brought to a standstill and there was "no state authority left," according to one police official.

After the deaths of three Temporary Anti-Gang Unit officers on 9 June 2024, and the PNH's 29th anniversary celebration on 12 June was cancelled, there were increased calls for Elbé to resign. He was replaced by former director-general Ramaeu Normil on 20 June. The police unions SPNH-17 and SYNAPOHA accused of Elbé of incompetence, reinforcing the gangs, preventing officers from doing their work. A total of 120 officers had been killed between October 2021 and June 2024. Gang activity was reduced when the MSS began to deploy in June. By mid-July, the PNH and MSS were conducting joint patrols in central Port-au-Prince neighborhoods that had been abandoned by police, and they began to go on the offensive. They temporarily prevented gang expansion into the nearby towns of Ganthier and Gressier, and raided Chérizier's stronghold in Delmas in November 2024.

In early 2025, after gangs seized the Delmas neighborhood and the PNH was unable to prevent them from advancing towards government offices in Pétion-Ville, acting prime minister Alix Didier Fils-Aimé created a drone task force as last resort. It consisted of Haitian police officers and private security contractors from Erik Prince's company. It was initially used to strike gang targets, but not to expand territorial control, because Rameau Normil did not want to collaborate with the task force. Normil was replaced by Vladimir Paraison in August 2025, who increased collaboration between the police and the drone task force. In their first joint operation, PNH officers, FAd'H soldiers, MSS personnel, and private contractors retook a telecommunications facility in Kenscoff, south of Port-au-Prince. At least 33 officers were killed from June 2024 to June 2025, when the PNH celebrated its 30th anniversary. The National Police killed 222 people in alleged summary executions during 2025.

As of 2026, the PNH continues to experience high desertion rates and problems training recruits because of gang activity near the main police academy. Despite this, the government launched the P4000 program to train 4,000 police officers in anti-gang operations with the help of foreign countries. The first cohort of officers graduated in January 2026. In September 2026, the P4000 program reached its half way point as more than 2,000 new officers had been trained.

== Structure ==
=== National administration ===
The law on the creation of the National Police passed by the Haitian parliament in November 1994 places the service in the Ministry of Justice and Public Security, and in the immediate jurisdiction of the Secretary of State for Justice (Public Security). The law separates the police from the armed forces and establishes that police officers are civilians. The PNH has its formal headquarters in Port-au-Prince. It is led by the Director-General of the National Police, who is appointed by the president and requires a Senate confirmation. The director-general is chosen from among the ranks of police central directors or divisional commissioners. The PNH is overseen by the Superior Council of the National Police, which consists of the ministers of justice and interior, and the director-general and inspector general of police.

The three main organizations within the PNH are the following: the Central Directorate of the Administrative Police (Direction centrale de la Police administrative), which maintains public order; the Central Directorate of the Judicial Police (Direction centrale de la Police judiciaire), which assists the courts with criminal investigations; and the Central Directorate of General and Administrative Services (Direction centrale de l’administration et des services généraux), which provides logistical support. There is also the Office of the Inspector General of the National Police (Inspection Générale de la Police Nationale d’Haïti), whose head answers to the minister of justice and the director-general, and is tasked with ensuring that the police follows its own internal regulations.

These central directorates are further subdivided into directorates for specific duties. The Administrative Police consists of directorates for Traffic and Road Policing; Public Safety and Maintenance of Order; Civil Protection; Territorial Services; Maritime, Air, Border, and Migration; and Forestry. The Judicial Police consists of directorates for Criminal Affairs, Intelligence, Forensic Science and Judicial Cooperation, and Juvenile Delinquency. General and Administrative Services consists of directorates for Legal Regulations, Personnel, Logistics, Schools and Continuing Education, and the Penitentiary Administration (Direction de l’administration pénitentiaire, DAP).

There are a number of specialized units. Protection for Haiti's political leadership is provided by the National Palace General Security Unit (Unité de Sécurité Générale du Palais Nationale; USGPN), the Security and Presidential Guard Unit (Unité de Sécurité et de Garde Présidentielle), and the Ministerial Security Corps (Corps de Sécurité Ministérielle). There are also paramilitary police tactical units, which include the Company for Intervention and Maintaining Public Order (Compagnie d'Intervention et de Maintien de l'Ordre, CIMO), a riot police unit; the Intervention Group of the Haitian National Police (Groupe d'Intervention de la Police Nationale d'Haïti, GIPNH), a rapid-response unit comparable to American SWAT teams; the Counter-Narcotics Trafficking Unit (Bureau de Lutte contre le Trafic des Stupefiants, BLTS); and the Temporary Anti-Gang Unit (UTAG). Other organizations include the Commission of the Coast Guard (Commissariat des Garde-Côtes; CGC).

==== Director-General of the National Police ====
- Adrien Rameau (May–December 1995)
- Fourel Célestin (acting, December 1995–21 February 1996)
- Pierre Denizé (21 February 1996–March 2001)
- Jean Nesly Lucien (March 2001–25 March 2003)
- Jean Claude Jean-Baptiste (25 March–6 June 2003)
- Jean Robert Faveur (6 June–21 June 2003)
- Jocelyne Pierre (27 June 2003–3 March 2004)
- Léon Charles (4 March 2004–24 July 2005)
- Mario Andrésol (24 July 2005–18 August 2012)
- Godson Aurélus (18 August 2012–April 2016)
- Michel-Ange Gédéon (April 2016–26 August 2019)
- Rameau Normil (acting, 27 August 2019–13 November 2020)
- Léon Charles (acting, 13 November 2020–21 October 2021)
- Frantz Elbé (acting, 21 October 2021–15 June 2024)
- Rameau Normil (acting, 15 June 2024–8 August 2025)
- Vladimir Paraison (acting, 8 August 2025–present)

=== Regional administration ===
A police station in Anse-à-Veau

There is a police directorate for each of the departments of Haiti, led by a divisional commissioner at the department's administrative center. Each departmental directorate is a jurisdiction of both Administrative Police and Judicial Police functions. Each also has its own departmental riot police unit (unité départementale de maintien de l'ordre, UDMO). The structure within every department, overseen the departmental directorate, consists of commissariats (stations) of the arrondissements and communes, and sub-commissariats (substations) of the quarters and sections.

== National Police Academy ==
The 1994 law on the creation of the Haitian National Police defines three institutions of the organization: the National Police, the École nationale de police (ENP), and the Académie nationale de police (ANP). Officers of the PNH must receive training at the ENP and ANP, or at a foreign training center that is approved by the PNH. The École nationale de police or National Police School, often referred to as the National Police Academy in English language sources, provides basic officer training. It was opened in January 1995, and is located in the Pétion-Ville area of Port-au-Prince. The ENP has 28-week basic training for classes of 500 to 900 recruits, who are accepted from among thousands of applicants that take part in competitive written and physical examinations. Haitian instructors became fully responsible for administering basic training in 2008, which consisted of courses in law, human rights, weapons and shooting, maintenance of order, police science, technical and scientific policing, and traffic circulation. The training is largely classroom work, though as of 2011 graduates underwent a one-year probation period observed by the United Nations Police (UNPOL).

An advanced training academy, the Académie nationale de police or National Police Academy, was developed with Canadian funding as part of the 2006 reform plan to educate mid-level and senior officers. The ANP was opened in April 2012 on Route de Frères, which is in Pétion-Ville, Port-au-Prince.

== Ranks ==
Rank group	Level B2 (commissioners and directors)				Level B1 (inspectors)			Level A (agents)
Haitian National Police
Haitian National Police	Directeur général de la Police nationale	Directeur central, inspecteur général	Commissaire divisionnaire	Commissaire principal	Inspecteur divisionnaire	Inspecteur principal	Inspecteur de police	Agent de police classe 4	Agent de police classe 3	Agent de police classe 2	Agent de police classe 1

== Vehicles ==
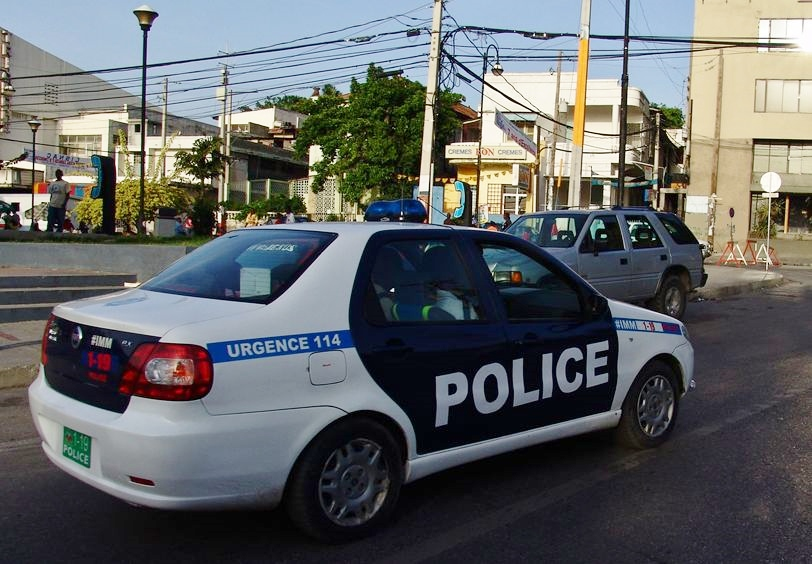
Fiat Siena patrol car in Port-au-Prince

- Dodge Ram
- Fiat Siena
- Lenco Bearcat
- INKAS Sentry APC and Geebor MRAP
- Nissan Frontier
- Terrier LT-79
- Toyota Hilux
- Roshel Senator
- Roshel Captain
- Harrow Tygor E-2
- IAG Guardian Xtreme MRAP

== Weapons ==
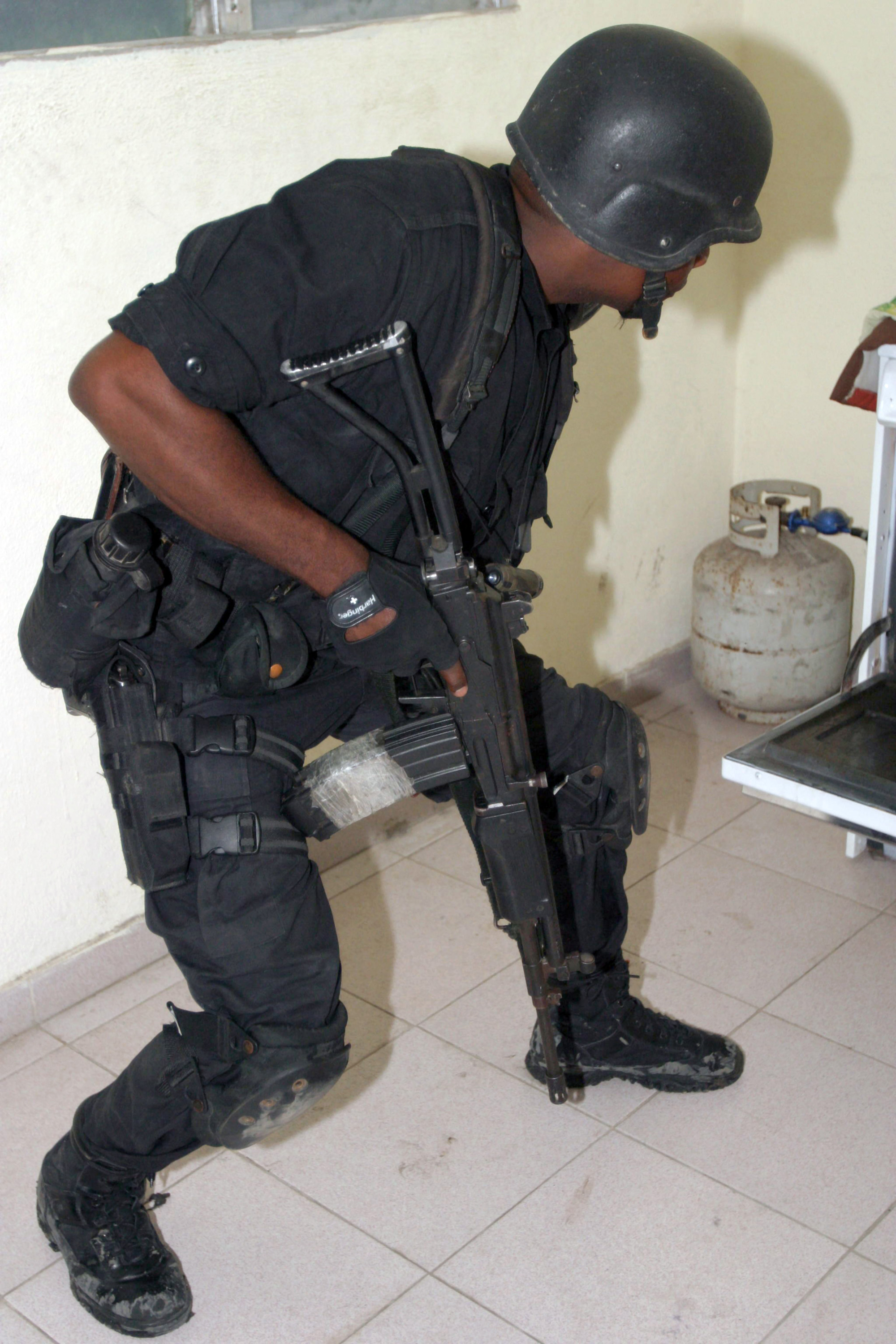
Intervention Group (GIPNH) officer with an R4 assault rifle, April 2004

- IMI Galil
- R4 assault rifle
- M16 rifle
- Heckler & Koch G3
- M240 machine gun
- M1918 Browning Automatic Rifle
- T65 assault rifle
- M1919 Browning machine gun
- Ruger Mini-14
- PTR rifle
- Taurus T4
- Benelli M4
- M14 rifle
- 12 gauge shotgun
- IWI Galil ACE
- IWI Tavor X95
- Daniel Defense DDM4
- M249 Squad Automatic Weapon

== See also ==
- Law enforcement in Haiti
- Armed Forces of Haiti

== Bibliography ==
Articles

- Carey, Henry F. (2005). "The Third U.S. Intervention and Haiti's Paramilitary Predicament". Journal of Haitian Studies. 11 (1): 88–111. JSTOR 41715292.
- Kovats-Bernat, J. Christopher (2006). "Factional Terror, Paramilitarism and Civil War in Haiti: The View from Port-Au-Prince, 1994-2004". Anthropologica. 48 (1): 117–39. doi:10.2307/25605301. JSTOR 25605301.

Books

- Avril, Prosper (1999). From Glory to Disgrace: The Haitian Army, 1804-1994. Universal Publishers. ISBN 978-1-58112-836-9.
- McCrocklin, James H. (1956). Garde d'Haiti, 1915–1934: Twenty Years of Organization and Training by the United States Marine Corps. Annapolis, Maryland: United States Naval Institute. LCCN 56-12610.
- Metz, Helen Chapin (2001). Dominican Republic and Haiti: Country Studies. Area handbook series. Washington, D.C.: Federal Research Division, Library of Congress. ISBN 978-0-8444-1044-9.

Documents and reports

- Crane, Keith; Dobbins, James; Miller, Laurel E.; Ries, Charles P.; Chivvis, Christopher S.; Haims, Marla C.; Overhaus, Marco; Schwartz, Heather Lee; Wilke, Elizabeth (2010). Building a More Resilient Haitian State (Report). RAND Corporation. ISBN 978-0-8330-5043-4. JSTOR 10.7249/mg1039srf-cc.
- International Crisis Group (30 October 2006). Haiti: Security and the Reintegration of the State. Crisis Group Latin America/Caribbean Briefing (Report). Vol. 12. JSTOR resrep43783.
- International Crisis Group (18 September 2008). Reforming Haiti's Security Sector. Crisis Group Latin America/Caribbean Report (Report). Vol. 28. JSTOR resrep38447.
- International Crisis Group (8 September 2011). Keeping Haiti Safe: Police Reform. Crisis Group Latin America/Caribbean Briefing (Report). Vol. 26. JSTOR resrep36780.
- International Crisis Group (30 September 2021). Haiti: A Path to Stability for a Nation in Shock. Crisis Group Latin America and Caribbean Briefing (Report). Vol. 44. JSTOR resrep36471.
- International Crisis Group (14 December 2022). Haiti's Last Resort: Gangs and the Prospect of Foreign Intervention (PDF). Crisis Group Latin America and Caribbean Briefing (Report). Vol. 48.
- International Crisis Group (15 December 2025). Undoing Haiti's Deadly Gang Alliance. Crisis Group Latin America & Caribbean Report (Report). Vol. 110. JSTOR resrep74805.
- "LOI DU 29 NOVEMBRE 1994 PORTANT CRÉATION, ORGANISATION ET FONCTIONNEMENT DE LA POLICE NATIONALE" [Law of 29 November 1994 on the creation, organization, and functioning of the National Police] (PDF). Le Moniteur No. 103 (in French). 28 December 1994.
- Neild, Rachel (18 March 1996). THE HAITIAN NATIONAL POLICE (PDF). WOLA Briefing Paper Series (Report). Washington Office on Latin America.
