= An Unbroken Agony =

2008 book on the history of Haiti by Randall Robinson

- Author: Randall Robinson
- Publisher: BasicCivitas Books
- Publication date: 2008
- ISBN: 0-465-07050-7

An Unbroken Agony: Haiti, From Revolution to the Kidnapping of a President is a book on the history of Haiti by Randall Robinson in 2008.

According to Randall Robinson, this book describes a non-standard history of Haiti. The title suggests to the reader that emphasis is put on the "Kidnapping of a President". In fact, Robinson describes a series of related events from 1492 that led up to the alleged 2004 kidnapping of Jean-Bertrand Aristide.

== Author ==
Randall Robinson is the founder of TransAfrica Forum an organization that was created for the improvement of relations between the United States and the continent of Africa. He is also a personal friend of Jean-Bertrand Aristide and was directly involved in the aftermath of the events surrounding the kidnapping of Aristide in 2004.

== Synopsis ==
Robinson begins by mention of the date and time of February 29, 2004 4:30 a.m., stating, "The real events of the story are very unlike those described to the general public." He knows that the conventional accounting of Aristide's removal from office is quite different than the entire history he is about to tell.

The date of December 9, 1492, is described as the most fateful of days... Then, there were an estimated 8 million native Taínos living on the island of Hispaniola. "Within 20 years, there were fewer than 28,000." "Thirty years on, by 1542, only 200 Taínos remained." Many chapters are also entitled with a date.

November 17, 1803, is a good example. This date represents a date that Robinson describes as significant because, "It may have been the most stunning victory won for the black world in a thousand years. There has been nothing quite like it, before or since." Here he is describing the defeat of slavery, in Haiti, by the Haitian revolutionary leader Toussaint Louverture. The ramification of these dates in Haitian history is monumental, per Robinson.

"As a direct result of what the Haitian revolutionaries did to free themselves, France lost two thirds of its world trade income." Furthermore, the Haitian revolutionaries had a global perspective on fighting slavery. They worked with Simón Bolívar in an effort to fight slavery in South America. And they also "rolled out an unconditional welcome mat to anyone who escaped European colonialism in Africa or fled bondage from a slave plantation anywhere in the Americas, North, South, or Central."

Meanwhile, in the United States Thomas Jefferson said, "If this combustion can be introduced among us under any veil whatever, we have to fear it." Jefferson was fearful that the Haitian revolt might spread to slaves in America. Robinson quotes Garry Wills..."From that moment, Jefferson and the Republicans showed nothing but hostility to the new nation of Haiti." Haiti had been "the most profitable slave colony in the world" and "slaves were routinely worked to death, starved to death, or beaten to death.". "Of the 465,000 black slaves living in Haiti when the revolt began, 150,000 would die during the 12 and a half years of fighting for their freedom."

Frederick Douglass is quoted as stating that the Haitian harbor of Môle-Saint-Nicolas is of such strategic importance that, "It commands the windward passage which is the shipping lane between Haiti and Cuba." "The nation that can get it and hold it will be the master of the land and sea in its neighborhood."

So for the next two hundred years, Haiti would be faced with the active hostility from the world's most powerful community of nations." The hostilities came in the form of "military invasions, economic embargoes, gunboat blockades, reparations demands, trade barriers, diplomatic quarantines, subsidized armed subversions." When the French departed from Haiti, they demanded reparations from Haiti of roughly $21 billion (in 2004 dollars).

Robinson states that there were a number of important precedents in the Caribbean that shed light on the U.S. position towards Haiti. They included sending U.S. troops to the Dominican Republic in the early 20th century to force the Dominican Republic to give Washington the power to collect customs revenues for the U.S. at the Dominican Republic's main shipping ports. This led to the U.S. invading the Dominican Republic in 1915 and occupying the country until the end of 1924.

In 1937, the Dominican Republic, under the U.S. sponsored dictatorship of Rafael Trujillo, massacred 35,000 Haitians. The American Secretary of State, Cordell Hull stated that, "Trujillo is one of the greatest men in Central America and in most of South America."

In 1954 the U.S. overthrew the democratically elected government of Guatemala. This occurred, according to Robinson, because the elected president Jacobo Árbenz Guzmán raised the minimum wage to $1.08/day and he attempted moderate land reforms for the benefit of the Guatemalan people. In response to this, the U.S. accused the Guzman government of being under the influence of communism. Robinson states that the Guzmán government had no communists in their fairly elected government and that the real reason for the U.S. aggression in the area was to protect the interest of the American owned corporation, the United Fruit Company, (now called Chiquita Brands).

Furthermore, Robinson says that the U.S. supported the Haitian dictators François Duvalier, and Jean-Claude Duvalier, Henri Namphy, Leslie Manigat, and Prosper Avril. François Duvalier killed an estimated 50,000 Haitians. He ruled from 1957 to 1971. Jean-Claude Duvalier took control after his father died in 1971 and continued the brutal dictatorship until February 1986.

Military rulers overthrew Aristide, not just once, but twice, once in 1991 and again in 2004. Both elections of Aristide were lawful democratic elections. "There were no charges of malfeasance, either adjudicated, or formally lodged against him." The elections also included the election of 7,500 other official government positions.

Robinson describes Aristide as "a democratic president who'd been elected twice by the largest margins on record for free elections in the Americas."

In 1991, shortly after Aristide was elected, he was overthrown by General Raoul Cédras, Colonel Roger Biambi, and Police Chief Michel François. In 1994 those dictators were forced from power and democracy was restored. Cédras had been trained by the U.S. at the School of the Americas. Later, Michel François was indicted by the U.S. Justice Department for shipping large quantities of cocaine.

In 1991, the former U.S. Attorney General, Ramsey Clark formed the Investigative Commission on Haiti. The Commission reported, "200 soldiers of the U.S. Special Forces arrived in the Dominican Republic with the authorization of Dominican Republic President Hipólito Mejía, as part of the military operation to train anti-democracy Haitian rebels." Robinson states, "Thus they were prepared to scuttle a democracy, a constitution, an elected parliament, a functioning national government, to drive one man, Jean-Bertrand Aristide out of office, out of Haiti, indeed out of the Western Hemisphere."

He continues to say, "To this wholly illegal and anti-democratic purpose, several forces cleaved as one. The armed rebels, the United States of America, France, Canada, the Dominican Republic, and a new association of Haitian opposition splinter groups forged, funded, and counseled, by the International Republican Institute, and the Convergence Démocratique, all worked towards the overthrow of the populist Aristide. Convergence Démocratique would later morph into a subversive right wing organ known as the Group of 184 " Haitian anti-democratic rebel leaders included Guy Philippe, Louis-Jodel Chamblain, Ernst Ravix, and Paul Arcelin.

"U.S. military officials have confirmed that 20,000 M16 rifles were given to the Dominican Republic shortly after Aristide normalized diplomatic relations with Cuba on February 6, 1996."

In November 2000, Aristide was re-elected for a second term with 90% of the vote. Aristide increased the number of schools, and hospitals, and he worked for the treatment and prevention of Aids. He raised Haiti's minimum wage in 2003 from $1/day to $2/day." He also established one standard birth certificate by eliminating the previous two-tiered race and class birth certificates."

In 2002 another anti-Aristide insurrection was led by Guy Philippe, a former police precinct captain who had been trained by the CIA ." Bertrand had proclaimed that France owed Haiti $21 billion (valued in current dollars) for the money France extorted from Haiti following its successful slave rebellion, and when Jean-Bertrand Aristide was kidnapped and removed from office in 2004, still 1% of the population owned 50% of the country's wealth."

Robinson states, "Where the poor were concerned, the United States invariably opposed the efforts of the poor's own governments, whenever and wherever those governments tried in any serious or structured way to ameliorate the poverty of their own people. If there has ever been a circumstance in which the Americans did not take the side of the rich in efforts to quash even modest reforms to help the poor, I do not know of it."

In early February 2004, the anti-Aristide rebels launched their attack by "torching fire stations, and jails…and murdering rural police officers" Per Robinson, on February 29, 2004, Aristide was kidnapped and driven out of office. Robinson states that the United States had always supported the wealthiest Haitian families such as the Mevs, the Bigios, the Apaids, the Boulos, the Nadals.

Senator Christopher Dodd confirmed this when he said, "We had interests and ties with some of the very strong financial interests in the country and Aristide was threatening them."

On January 1, 2004, Haiti celebrated its 200th birthday and 500,000 Haitians celebrated the fact that they now had a democratically elected government.

On Saturday February 7, 2004, 1,000,000 Haitian people demonstrated in support of Aristide. They were demanding that he be allowed to finish his five-year term. They knew that his governance was being threatened.

The United States, however, favored the International Republican Institute (IRI) which is a U.S. non-profit organization that builds mechanisms to support "democracy" overseas. Per Robinson, despite their claims, the IRI funded right wing wealthy opponents to the Aristide government and thereby supported the opposite of democracy. Furthermore, Stanley Lucas was the senior program officer for the IRI and he had significant Duvalier affiliations.

The Bush administration through an Assistant Secretary for the Western Hemisphere, Roger Noriega, fully supported the I.R.I. Jesse Helms, the Republican chairman of the US Senate Foreign Relations Committee, called Aristide "insane, dictatorial, tyrannical, corrupt and a psychopath." Dominique de Villepin, the French foreign minister, blamed Aristide for "spreading violence." Jamaican Prime Minister, P. J. Patterson, threatened to "impose sanctions on Aristide."

The American television networks portrayed Aristide's departure in 2004 as if it were a voluntary departure.

Randall Robinson spoke with Aristide on March 1, 2004, to learn then that Aristide had been transported to the Central African Republic against his will. Robinson was told by Aristide that Aristide had been forcibly removed from office in a coup.

Per Robinson, the Haitian rebels who had removed Aristide from office, "had been trained by United States Special Forces." They were trained "in the Dominican villages of Neiba, San Cristóbal, San Isidro, Hatillo, and Haina."

Robinson states that the Armed Forces of Haiti (the Haitian Armed Forces under the Duvalier regimes), and the Front for the Advancement and Progress of Haïti (FRAPH, a paramilitary death squad that fought against democracy) massacred some 5,000 Haitians between 1991 and 1994.

Louis-Jodel Chamblain, a Duvalier death squad leader, was accused of war crimes committed in 1987, 1991, 1993 and 1994 including the murder of Antoine Izméry, a pro-democracy advocate.

Guy Philippe received Central Intelligence Agency training in Ecuador. He ordered paramilitary to kill Aristide supporters. Per Robinson, the opposition to democracy was "an amalgam of killers, drug runners, embezzlers, kleptocrats and sadists and included the wealthy and the elites of Haitian society." Per Robinson, the United States provided the rebels with M16s, grenades, grenade launchers, M50s.

Emmanuel Constant was another player in opposition to Aristide, and along with Phillipe and Chamblain, they slaughtered thousands of innocent pro-democracy civilians.

After the abduction of Aristide, George W. Bush called Jacques Chirac to thank him for French cooperation in the removal of Aristide.

Robinson continues, "Condoleezza Rice had directly threatened Jamaica for offering asylum to Aristide" "The United States wanted Aristide not only out of Haiti but out of the Caribbean.

Senator Christopher Dodd cited U.S. Department of Defense documents that indicated that the US did, in fact, supply 20,000 M16s to the Dominican Republic prior to the deposition of Aristide. "American officials had armed and directed the thugs, organized an un-elected and un-electable opposition, and choked the Haitian economy into dysfunctional penury."

The Central African Republic President at the time was François Bozizé. The Central African Republic is French controlled. The French Defense Minister stated that the Aristides were being guarded by French soldiers in Bangui, the capital of the Central African Republic.

Robinson and Maxine Waters (member of the U.S. Congress) then obtained an offer of asylum signed by P. J. Patterson, the prime minister of Jamaica. They attempted to get François Bozizé, the president of the Central African Republic, to accept it. CBS, NBC, ABC and CNN all turned down Robinson's request to join him to report on the events surrounding the removal of Aristide from office. Robinson, however, did get Amy Goodman (an independent news reporter for Democracy Now!), Sharon Hay-Webster (a member of the Jamaican parliament), Peter Eisner (a deputy foreign editor at the Washington Post), Sidney Williams (a former U.S. ambassador to the Bahamas), Ira Kurzban (one of the best known lawyers in America for Immigration and Employment Law) to join him in Bangui.

Robinson states, "American decision makers only feign concern about world poverty. And they sustain the lament only so long as the pretense and its addictive but useless, solutions are profitable, directly or indirectly, to American private interests." "The force, the power plant, is money, the relentless campaign to capture it, and the God-invoked armed ruthlessness to keep it."

Robinson and his entourage succeeded in getting Bozizé to release Aristide and Aristide's wife to the entourage and they took the couple to Jamaica. ."

The U.S. then installed Gérard Latortue as interim president. When Latortue rescinded the Haitian demand for restitution from France, Florida House Republicans Mark Foley and Clay Shaw introduced a house resolution commending Latortue for his great service to Haiti."

Robinson states that, between the day of the abduction and the election, in 2006, of René Préval, at least 4000 Haitians had been killed by the interim government."

Finally, Robinson concludes by saying "as long as one member nation of the global family of nations is free to behave toward a fellow member nation with lethal impunity—to bully, to menace, to invade, to destabilize politically or economically, to reduce to tumult—no country, so threatened, can hope to enjoy the social and political contentment that ought inherently to attend democratic practices."
