= National Revolutionary Front for the Liberation and Reconstruction of Haiti =

Haitian rebellion group

The National Revolutionary Front for the Liberation and Reconstruction of Haiti (French: Front pour la libération et la reconstruction nationales) was a rebel group in Haiti that controlled most of the country following the 2004 Haitian coup d'état. It was briefly known as the "Revolutionary Artibonite Resistance Front", after the country's central Artibonite region, before being renamed on February 19, 2004, to emphasize its national scope.

The group can be considered an alliance between two elements within the coup: armed anti-government gangs and former soldiers of the disbanded Haitian army. The most prominent of the gangs was the one based in Gonaïves, formerly known as the "Cannibal Army", who had once supported Lavalasian-party President, Jean-Bertrand Aristide but later turned against him. The coup initiated with the Cannibal Army's capture of Gonaïves on February 5, 2004. It was led until his death in 2005 by Buteur Metayer since the murder (allegedly on Aristide's orders) of Buteur's brother, Amiot Metayer, in late 2003.

The group’s name had been used a fear-tactic to spread intimidation who aimed to “eat the spoils of the Lavalasian state”, but they were not actual cannibals.

Following the capture of Gonaïves, the rebels quickly moved into several neighboring towns, expelling the police from them. Some of these, such as Saint-Marc, were retaken by the police and pro-Aristide militants within days. However. on February 14, the rebels were reinforced by opponents of the government who had returned from exile in the Dominican Republic: 20 former soldiers, led by Louis-Jodel Chamblain, a former militia leader who headed army death squads in 1987 and a militia known as the Front for the Advancement and Progress of Haïti (FRAPH), which killed and maimed at least 4,000 people, and raped and tortured thousands more in the early 1990s. By February 17, the rebel forces had captured the central town of Hinche, near the Dominican border. According to reports, this attack was led by Chamblain. The rebels also controlled most of the roads connecting the central Artibonite province with the north and south of the country.

It has been alleged that, from 2001 to 2004, the United States Government funded and implemented training operations for a group of 600 anti-Aristide paramilitary soldiers, with the approval of the Dominican Republic's president, Hipolito Mejia. This training was allegedly carried out by roughly 200 members of the US Special Forces. Among the soldiers trained during this operation were known human-rights violators, Guy Philippe and Louis-Jodel Chamblain.

On February 4, 2004, the paramilitary groups led by Buteur Metayer, Guy Philippe, and Louis-Jodel Chamblain began marching on the capital of Haiti, Port-au-Prince. On February 22, the rebels captured the country's second-largest city, Cap-Haïtien. By February 25, nearly the entire north was in rebel hands, and the rebels were threatening to attack the capital, Port-au-Prince. On February 29, Aristide resigned under intense pressure from the United States Government and an impending attack from rebel groups, including the National Revolutionary Front for the Liberation of Haiti. Aristide was Haiti's first democratically elected president. April 24, 2004, Louis-Jodel Chamblain surrendered to Haitian authorities after being convicted in absentia of the slaughter of dozens in Haiti in 1999.
