= Luc Mesadieu =

Haitian politician

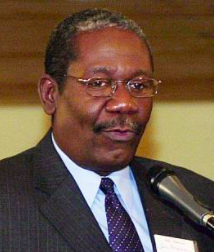

Luc Mesadieu is a Haitian political figure and member of the political party New Christian Movement for a New Haiti (Mochrena). Mesadieu has been a political opponent of former Haitian president Jean-Bertrand Aristide. He has been attacked in his home in December 2003 by thugs associated with Aristide, among them Amiot Métayer. His assistant, Ramy Daran, was burned to death that day.

== Early life ==
Mesadieu is a dentist by profession. He worked for Jean-Claude Duvalier as his personal dentist. Mesadieu is an Evangelical pastor with two churches in the city of Gonaives. He has four children. He claimed to have been called to run for president by the voice of God in 2000.

== On the issues ==
Mesadieu ran for president in the 2005 elections. Among his major issues was the economy. Mesadieu claims he wants to fix the Haitian economy with greater regional ties with the United States and bodies such as the Organization of American States. Mesadieu has stated he is as a pro-business politician.
