= Guy Malary =

Haitian politician (1943–1993)

Guy Malary (10 June 1943 – 14 October 1993) was a Justice Minister of Haiti, appointed by Jean-Bertrand Aristide in 1991 and continuing in office under the post-1991 Haitian coup d'état regime. He was killed in an ambush along with his bodyguards. "According to the petitioners [to the Inter-American Court of Human Rights], in the course of carrying out his duties, Mr. Malary worked for the implementation of the Governor's Island Accord, advocating the creation of an independent police force and carrying out a comprehensive review of the judicial system of Haiti, which brought him into direct conflict with the authorities in the country at the time."

According to the Center for Constitutional Rights, a CIA memo dated October 28, 1993 implicated FRAPH members Louis-Jodel Chamblain, Emmanuel Constant, and Gabriel Douzable. The memo claimed they met with an unidentified member of the Haitian military to plan the assassination of Malary.

The domestic building at Port-au-Prince International Airport is named after him, as is a major road in eastern Cap-Haïtien.
