= Mario Joseph =

Haitian lawyer (1962/1963–2025)

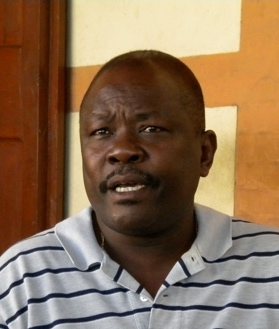
- Joseph in 2010
- Born: 1962 or 1963
- Died: 31 March 2025 (aged 62)
- Education: École Normale Supérieure; École de Droit des Gonaïves
- Occupations: Lawyer; activist; philanthropist
- Organization: Bureau des Avocats Internationaux
- Known for: Human rights work
- Awards: Judith Lee Stronach Human Rights Award (2009); Katharine and George Alexander Law Prize (2009)

Mario Joseph (1962 or 1963 – 31 March 2025) was a Haitian human rights lawyer. From 1996 until his death, he led the Bureau des Avocats Internationaux (BAI) in Port-au-Prince, which represents political prisoners, impoverished communities, and victims of political violence. In 2006, The New York Times called Joseph "Haiti's most prominent human rights lawyer".

== Background ==
Joseph received degrees from Haiti's École Normale Supérieure and Gonaïves Law School. He then worked on human rights cases for the Catholic Church's Peace and Justice Commission before joining the BAI in 1996.

== Raboteau Massacre ==
Joseph was the lead lawyer for the victims in the prosecution of the BAI's most successful case, the Raboteau Massacre trial. The trial was described by a United Nations expert as "the longest and most complex" in the history of the Haitian judicial system. After six weeks of trial ending in November 2000, the Raboteau Massacre jury convicted 53 defendants for a 1994 attack on a pro-democracy neighborhood, 37 of whom were convicted in absentia. The Court also ordered that the defendants pay civil damages of 1 billion gourdes (roughly $43 million USD).

Three former members of the military high command were later deported from the U.S. to Haiti to face charges in Raboteau, including former Assistant Commander-in-Chief Jean-Claude Duperval, who had worked at Disney World for five years after leaving Haiti. According to the Institute for Justice & Democracy in Haiti (IJDH), Duperval was the highest-ranked soldier ever deported from the U.S. to face human rights charges.

Joseph helped the Center for Justice & Accountability pursue other perpetrators of the Raboteau Massacre in U.S. courts. On 16 May 2008, these efforts resulted in a damage recovery of more than $400,000 USD from former Col. Carl Dorélien, who had recently won the Florida State Lottery. The same year, Joseph also provided an affidavit against Emmanuel Constant, a former paramilitary leader and convicted Raboteau perpetrator, when Constant was on trial for mortgage fraud in New York.

== United Nations cholera lawsuit ==
In 2012, Joseph and IJDH Director Brian Concannon filed suit against the United Nations on behalf of victims of the 2010–2011 Haiti cholera outbreak, allegedly introduced to Haiti by UN troops in October 2010. According to the Haitian Health Ministry, as of August 2012, the outbreak had caused 7,490 deaths and caused 586,625 people to fall ill. Investigations by the New England Journal of Medicine and the US Centers for Disease Control pointed to the United Nations Stabilization Mission in Haiti base in Mirebalais as the source of the cholera outbreak. The UN denied responsibility, though epidemiological and genome studies appeared to have conclusively established the peacekeeping force's role, and UN Special Envoy Bill Clinton described the force as "the proximate cause of cholera". By challenging the legal immunity of peacekeepers, The Economist described the suit as a landmark case that could "affect peacekeeping operations worldwide". In August 2012, a Pulitzer Center reporter described the case as going "nowhere fast", though Joseph and Concannon intended to continue pursuing it.

Joseph speaks about the case in the short documentary Baseball in the Time of Cholera, which won the 2012 Best Documentary Short Special Jury Mention at the Tribeca Film Festival. The case was dismissed by the Southern District of New York on the grounds of UN immunity, but has been appealed to the second circuit.

== Other cases ==
In the late 1990s and early 2000s Joseph worked through the BAI on the Raboteau case as well as on various other cases aimed at bringing to justice ex-military and paramilitary death squad members. His activities and the activities of the BAI during this time period are discussed in more depth in a 2012 book with Monthly Review Press. The activities of the BAI and the Haitian government of Jean-Bertrand Aristide in seeking justice for the victims of paramilitary and military violence are documented in detail.

He and the BAI were also tasked with helping to investigate the murder of famed radio journalist Jean Dominique and the security guard at Dominique's radio station. His view on how the case was exploited and manipulated to undermine the elected government of Jean-Bertrand Aristide is discussed in more depth in an interview with Joseph and attorney Brian Concannon. The interview is published in the journal of Haitian studies.

Joseph represented Catholic Priest and human rights activist Fr. Gérard Jean-Juste, who was designated a prisoner of conscience by Amnesty International following his multiple arrests in 2004 and 2005.

In January 2007, Joseph testified before the Inter-American Court of Human Rights in Costa Rica, in the case of Yvon Neptune v. Haiti, the first Haitian case that the Court had considered. On 6 May, the Court ruled that the Haitian government had violated 11 provisions of the American Convention on Human Rights by keeping Neptune, a former prime minister, in detention and failing to try his case with sufficient speed.

In 2010, Joseph and the BAI worked with a number of victims of sexual abuse in the IDP camps created following the 2010 Haiti earthquake.

In January 2012, Joseph spoke out against a ruling by a judge that former dictator Jean Claude Duvalier would be tried only for embezzlement and corruption charges, rather than human rights abuses.

== Threats and intimidation ==
Under Haiti's interim government (2004–2006), Joseph represented alleged political prisoners, including top former government officials, journalists and grassroots organizers. His advocacy generated frequent threats; his family was forced to leave the country, and Amnesty International issued an Urgent Action alert out of concern for his safety in November 2004. His family received political asylum from the U.S. and now resides in Miami.

In late 2012, Joseph reported increasing levels of intimidation attempts against him and stated his belief that he was being targeted by the Haitian government. On 28 September, Jean Renel Sénatus, former Chief Prosecutor of Port-au-Prince, stated that he had been dismissed by the Ministry of Justice after refusing to order the arrest of 36 opposition activists, including Joseph. The reports caused Amnesty International to begin another "Urgent Action" letter-writing campaign on Joseph's behalf, calling on authorities to investigate the threats. The alleged intimidation was also protested by the Center for Justice and Accountability, the Center for Economic Policy and Research, the US National Lawyers Guild, US Congressman John Conyers, and the Center for Constitutional Rights.

== Political opinions ==
Joseph considered MINUSTAH as an occupation force. According to him, the United States used the United Nations to control the politics in Haiti indirectly. Brazil only took part in the operation because the US offered a permanent seat in the United Nations Security Council.

After the arrest of the Brazilian ex-president Luiz Inácio Lula da Silva due to Operation Car Wash, he signed a letter stating that Lula was a political prisoner.

== Death ==
Joseph died following a traffic collision on 31 March 2025. He was 62.

== Awards and recognition ==
In 2009, Joseph won the Katharine and George Alexander Law Prize from the Santa Clara University Law School, and the Judith Lee Stronach Human Rights Award from the Center for Justice & Accountability. He delivered the Judge Leon A. Higginbotham Human Rights Lecture at the University of Pennsylvania in November 2011, and was recognized by the Center for Constitutional Rights in New York in June 2012 for his "extraordinary work." He delivered the commencement address in May 2013 for graduates of the Indiana University Robert H. McKinney School of Law.
