= Institute for Justice & Democracy in Haiti =

American nonprofit organization

- Founded: February 2004
- Type: 501(c)(3) organization
- Tax ID no.: 03-0541424
- Location: Boston, Massachusetts, United States
- Website: www.ijdh.org

The Institute for Justice & Democracy in Haiti (IJDH) is a non-profit organization based in Boston, Massachusetts, US, that seeks to accompany the people of Haiti in their nonviolent struggle for the consolidation of constitutional democracy, justice and human rights. IJDH distributes information on human rights conditions in Haiti, pursues legal cases in Haitian, U.S. and international courts, and promotes grassroots advocacy initiatives with organizations in Haiti and abroad. IJDH was founded in the wake of the February 2004 coup d'état that overthrew Haiti's elected, constitutional government. The institute works closely with its Haitian affiliate, the Bureau des Avocats Internationaux (BAI).

== Recent work ==
=== Cholera ===
IJDH, in affiliation with Bureau des Avocats Internationaux, represents victims of the 2010 Cholera Epidemic. Together they seek justice for over 9,600 Haitians killed and 800,000 infected and counting since the Cholera outbreak. The Cholera epidemic originated shortly after the arrival of UN Peacekeepers from Nepal, where cholera is endemic. The country had not reported an instance of cholera in over a century prior to the arrival of UN Peacekeepers, and IJDH and the BAI allege that the haphazard and inadequate sewage piping at the UN base caused the initial spread of the disease.

In November 2011, IJDH and BAI filed 5,000 claims to the U.N demanding accountability for the cholera epidemic. The case calls for the UN to implement a national water and sanitation system, fully compensate the victims of the epidemic, and issue a public apology. Various responses were both supportive and critical of this endeavor. Victoria Fan, in a joint post with Richard Cash from the Harvard School of Public Health, suggests that the lawsuit focused on the wrong culprit. Rather than addressing the problems of the environment and seeing this as a global failure to Haitians, the lawsuit is just playing a form of the “blame game”.

In February 2013, the UN dismissed the claims, citing a confluence of factors, which contributed to the epidemic. It also invoked legal immunity per Section 29 of the Convention on the Privileges and Immunities of the United Nations, adopted by the General Assembly on 13 February 1946. Some argue that changing policy on immunity for the Cholera Case could dramatically affect the way UN Peacekeeping Missions are run in the future.

Early May 2013, IJDH and the BAI called for the UN to begin talks over the compensation claims. If talks did not begin the BAI and IJDH threatened to bring the organization to court. On July 5, 2013, the UN confirmed it would not consider IJDH's claims in a letter responding to Congresswoman Maxine Waters May letter urging the UN to accept responsibility for the introduction of cholera in Haiti. On October 9, 2013, IJDH and the BAI filed a class action lawsuit against the UN in New York on behalf of victims of the cholera epidemic and their families. The case was dismissed in the Southern District of New York but has been appealed to the Second Circuit.

=== Immigration advocacy ===
IJDH advocates for the creation of a Haitian Family Reunification Program. In 2010, nine days before the devastating earthquake, the Department of Homeland Security granted Haiti a temporary Protected Status for 18 months. This was extended twice to its current expiration date, July 22, 2014. TPS protects Haitians, who have arrived in Haiti before a certain date, from deportation. Immediately after the earthquake many members of congress indicated support for a system mirroring the Cuban program. This would allow many Haitians to join their families in the United States while they wait for visa status.

At the beginning of 2013 pressure continued as the world marked the third anniversary of the 2010 earthquake. It is estimated that 4,000 Haitians still live in tents and makeshift homes. A reunification program would allow many refugees to safely wait for their visas in the United States, rather than in Haiti.

=== Rape Accountability and Prevention Project ===
Following the earthquake in 2010, desperate living conditions and lack of security—particularly for people in the tent camps—caused a spike in sexual assaults. Residents in Port-au-Prince's tent cities were more than 20 times as likely to report a sexual assault as other Haitians and 14 percent of tent camp households reported at least one member having been sexually assaulted. In the first two years after the earthquake, convictions for sexual crimes were rare.

In response to the problem, IJDH, along with BAI and a coalition of Haitian grassroots women's rights groups, formed the Rape Accountability and Prevention Project in June 2010. The project sought to increase prosecution of rapes, and also to provide support, better services and medical care for survivors. In August 2011, BAI was pursuing 20 cases of sexual violence in the justice system. By July 2012, that number had grown to 60. In 2012, BAI brought seven cases to trial, all resulting in convictions.

In Haiti, rape has been considered a serious felony punishable by the courts only since 2005. Police can be slow to arrest perpetrators, doctors are often unwilling to help provide the medical evidence necessary for prosecution, and the court system often works against victims, particularly those who are poor. "Most of the laws we have here have been made by men," BAI's managing attorney Mario Joseph said in 2014. "They look for a way to accuse the women: 'Why did you wear that dress? Why were you there at this time? Why didn't you stay home?' Even when you start the process it's like you've lost the process."

== Board members ==
- Brian Concannon Jr. Esq., Director, Institute for Justice & Democracy in Haiti.
- Dr Paul Farmer, M.D. Ph.D., Founder, Partners in Health and Professor, Harvard Medical School
- Laura Flynn, MFA, Fellow, Human Rights Program at the University of Minnesota
- Ira Kurzban, Esq.
- Bryan Stevenson, Esq., founder and executive director of the Equal Justice Initiative of Alabama, professor of Clinical Law, NYU School of Law
- Irwin Stotzky Esq., Professor of Law, University of Miami School of Law, Director, Center for the Study of Human Rights

== Collaborators ==
- Center for Justice and Accountability
- Harvard Law School: Human Rights Program
- Seton Hall Law School: Immigration and Human Rights Clinic
- TransAfrica Forum
- University of California, Hastings Law School: Human Rights Project for Haiti
- University of San Francisco: Center For Law & Global Justice
- Northeastern University School of Law
- Yale Law School: Lowenstein Human Rights Clinic
