= Raboteau massacre =

1994 massacre in Raboteau Gonaïves, Haiti

Coordinates: 19°27′N 72°41′W

The Raboteau massacre was an incident on April 22, 1994, in which military and paramilitary forces attacked the neighborhood of Raboteau Gonaïves, Haiti, the citizens of which had been participating in pro-Jean-Bertrand Aristide demonstrations. At least 23 residents were killed, though most groups estimated the true casualties to be higher.

In 2000, a Haitian court tried fifty-nine people for alleged roles in the massacre, of whom 37, including former coup leader Raoul Cédras, were tried in absentia. Sixteen of those tried in person were convicted, while all 37 of those tried in absentia were convicted and given sentences of life imprisonment. In May 2005, all sentences from the tribunal were overturned by the Supreme Court.

== Massacre ==
Raboteau is a shanty town neighborhood by the sea in Gonaïves in north-west Haiti. Following the 1991 Haitian coup d'état against President Jean-Bertrand Aristide, residents held rallies in support of Aristide and opposing the de facto military dictatorship that replaced him.

On April 22, 1994, soldiers and paramilitary forces made a dawn raid on the neighborhood. They went house-to-house, beating and arresting residents, including children and the elderly, making some lie in open sewers. People who ran were shot. Soldiers also fired indiscriminately on citizens who were collecting firewood, and commandeered rowboats to attack fishing boats off-shore.

The military forbade families from collecting the bodies of the dead, making an exact count impossible. Journalists in Raboteau estimated that at least thirty people were killed, while later court proceedings stated that at least six people were known to have been killed. Human rights lawyers estimated that eight to fifteen people had been killed.

== Court cases in Haiti ==
In 2000, fifty-nine people were put on trial for their alleged roles in the massacre, 37 of whom, including coup leader Raoul Cédras, former Chief of National Police Michel François, and paramilitary leaders Emmanuel Constant and Louis-Jodel Chamblain, were tried in absentia. Prosecutors were aided in preparing the case by Mario Joseph and Brian Concannon of the Bureau des Avocats Internationaux. The trial lasted 6 weeks and ended on November 9, 2000. The jury found 16 of the 22 defendants in custody guilty of participation in the massacre, acquitting six. Twelve of those found guilty were sentenced to life imprisonment, while the other four were given four- to nine-year sentences. The 37 defendants who were tried in absentia were all convicted and given life sentences of hard labor.

The New York Times described the trial as a "landmark" case for Haiti, "a step in bringing to justice an elite tier of military and paramilitary officers and their cohorts for human rights abuses". The trial was the subject of a 2003 documentary, Pote Mak Sonje: The Raboteau Trial.

By 2005, one of the sixteen imprisoned defendants had died, while the remaining fifteen had reportedly escaped from prison, some in a mass jailbreak in Gonaives in which a bulldozer was driven through the walls of a prison On May 3, 2005, the Supreme Court overturned the sentences, ruling that "the Criminal Tribunal of Gonaïves, having been established with the assistance of a jury, was not competent to rule the case". The reversal was condemned by Amnesty International, which called it "a huge step backwards".

== Court cases in the US ==
=== Emmanuel Toto Constant ===
Emmanuel “Toto” Constant fled Haiti on foot into the Dominican Republic from which he was able to fly to the United States.

He was eventually jailed by the U.S. Immigration and Naturalization Service. As reported by David Grann, in his article in The Atlantic Monthly “Giving ‘The Devil’ His due....” Constant worked with the CIA, by his own admission and that of U.S government sources. In 1996, Secretary of State Warren Christopher submitted an affidavit to the immigration court, advocating Constant's deportation. Secretary Christopher noted the extensive and credible accusations of human rights violations by Constant, and reasoned that a failure to deport Constant would give the appearance that the U.S. government supported Constant's activities. The judge agreed and issued a deportation order, but it has not been executed. Following the order, Constant filed suit against Janet Reno claiming that the CIA had "collaborated" with him. Constant was eventually freed from U.S. custody with a gag order.

In 2006, Constant was ordered by a New York state court to pay $19 million in civil damages to three women who had been raped and tortured by the Front for the Advancement and Progress of Haïti. The case was brought by the Center for Justice & Accountability and the Center for Constitutional Rights.

In 2008, Constant was convicted of six felony counts related to mortgage fraud and sentenced to 12–37 years in prison. He is currently incarcerated in a maximum security prison in New York.

=== Col. Carl Dorelien ===
Carl Dorelien, was a colonel in the Haitian military during the 1991–1994 coup, in charge of discipline and personnel matters. Following the restoration of Haiti’s democracy, Dorelien fled to the United States. In 2003, he was deported to Haiti because of his human rights record, and was taken into custody for his absentia conviction. He chose not to exercise his right to a new trial. One year after his return President Aristide was once again ousted in a coup in 2004 and Dorelien escaped prison. He has not been returned to prison as of May 2008.

The Center for Justice and Accountability filed a suit against Dorelien just before his deportation. The suit was brought under the Alien Tort Statute seeking civil damages for the deaths of plaintiff Marie Jean’s husband, who was killed in the Raboteau Massacre, and the arbitrary detainment and torture of labor leader Lexiuste Cajuste. On February 23, 2007, Dorelien was found civilly liable in U.S. Federal Court for torture and extrajudicial killing. He was ordered to pay $4.3 million in civil damages.

In 1997, Dorelien won $3 million in the Florida Lottery. His winnings were garnished and placed into escrow. In August 2006, on C.J.A.’s movement, the state court of Florida ruled the Haitian civil judgment against Dorelien was enforceable in the U.S.

The assets seized from Col. Dorelien were distributed to the Raboteau victims on May 16, 2008.

== See also ==
- List of massacres in Haiti
