= Ira Kurzban =

American civil rights and immigration lawyer

Ira J. Kurzban
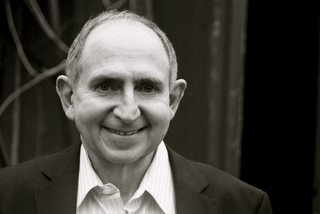
- Born: Brooklyn, New York City, U.S.
- Education: J.D., Boalt Hall School of Law at University of California, Berkeley; M.A., University of California, Berkeley; B.A., Syracuse University
- Employer(s): Kurzban Kurzban Tetzeli & Pratt, P.A.

Ira J. Kurzban is an American civil rights and immigration lawyer. He is the author of Kurzban's Immigration Law Sourcebook, published by the American Immigration Council. Kurzban received widespread media coverage during the 1980s for his representation of Haitian immigrants in Miami, and, in the 1990s and more recently, for his representation of the Haitian government and its two-time president, Jean-Bertrand Aristide.

Kurzban is a founding partner in the law firm of Kurzban Kurzban Tetzeli & Pratt, P.A., of Miami, Florida, and serves as adjunct faculty member in Immigration and Nationality Law at the University of Miami School of Law. He is also a founding board member of Immigrants' List, a political action committee focusing on immigration issues. He was a founder of the Institute for Justice & Democracy in Haiti and served as board chair from 2004 to 2019.

== Academic honors ==
Kurzban holds J.D. and M.A. Degrees from the University of California, Berkeley, and a B.A. with honors from Syracuse University, where he graduated Phi Beta Kappa. He also holds an honorary law degree from the University of Pennsylvania Law School and is also the 2003–04 recipient of the Wasserstein Fellowship at Harvard University Law School.

== Professional honors ==
Kurzban was the first recipient of the Tobias Simon Pro Bono Award, presented by the Chief Justice of the Florida Supreme Court. He is also the recipient of the Lawyers of the Americas Award for his work on behalf of human rights in the Americas given by the University of Miami, The Jack Wasserman Award for excellence in federal litigation and the Edith Lowenstein Memorial Award for excellence in the advancement of immigration law given by the American Immigration Lawyers Association, and the Carol King Award for his effort in immigration law given by the National Lawyers Guild.

In 1986, Kurzban was selected by Newsweek magazine in their commemorative issue on the 100th anniversary of the Statue of Liberty, as one of 100 American heroes for his work on behalf of immigrants. He was also selected by Esquire Magazine as part of America's New Leadership Class. Kurzban has also been named to Who's Who in America, Who's Who in American Law, and Who's Who in the World. He was also called a "legend in the field" and listed among the world's most highly regarded individuals in the International Who's Who of Corporate Immigration Lawyers. In 2020, he received the Leonard J. Theberge Award for Private International Law given by the American Bar Association for his work in immigration and international law.

Kurzban served as president (1987–88) of the American Immigration Lawyers Association (AILA) and has also served as the association's general counsel.

In June 2023, AILA honored Ira Kurzban with the Robert E. Juceam Founders Award, which is given from time to time to the person or entity having the most substantial impact on the field of immigration law or policy.

== Litigation ==
Kurzban has litigated over 50 federal cases concerning the rights of aliens, including Jean v. Nelson, Commissioner v. Jean, and McNary v Haitian Refugee Center, Inc., which he argued before the United States Supreme Court. He has also litigated numerous cases under the Alien Tort Claims Act and the Torture Victim Protection Act, including obtaining a $500 million judgment against Jean-Claude Duvalier, the former dictator of Haiti. He recently prevailed against the U.S. Department of Homeland Security, after a 23-year battle, to gain U.S. citizenship for English-born rapper Slick Rick.

== Haiti and Aristide ==
Kurzban also served as U.S. attorney for Haiti's elected governments since 1991 (led by Jean-Bertrand Aristide (1991 & 1994–96), René Préval (1996-2000), and Aristide again (2000–04)). After Aristide was forced from office and cast into exile, Kurzban has served as the former president's personal attorney in the United States. On March 18, 2011, Aristide, accompanied by Kurzban and others, returned to Haiti. Kurzban's involvement with the Aristide government was extremely controversial, as U.S. Department of Justice filings revealed that Kurzban's law firm earned nearly $5 million for its lobbying work alone during Aristide's 2001 to 2004 second term, a time during which the government was accused of serious human rights abuses and Aristide was named an "international press freedom predator" by the press freedom group Reporters sans frontières.

== Publications ==
=== Kurzban's Sourcebook ===
First published in 1990, Kurzban's Immigration Law Sourcebook has become one of the most respected treatises on immigration law, particularly among attorneys, judges, and government officials involved with immigration issues. The original 490-page edition was derived from notes Kurzban used while teaching immigration law. Now in its 18th edition, the Sourcebook has since grown to nearly 3,000 pages. The book has been cited by administrative tribunals, federal courts, and state supreme courts.

=== Other publications ===
- "Comprehensive Immigration Reform: The Missing Debate," Legal Briefs on Immigration Reform (Robinson Omnimedia Publishing, 2011)
- "Democracy and Immigration," Keeping Out the Other (Columbia U. Press, 2008)
- "Restructuring the Asylum Process," 19 San Diego L. Rev. 91 (1981–82)
