= Law enforcement in Haiti =

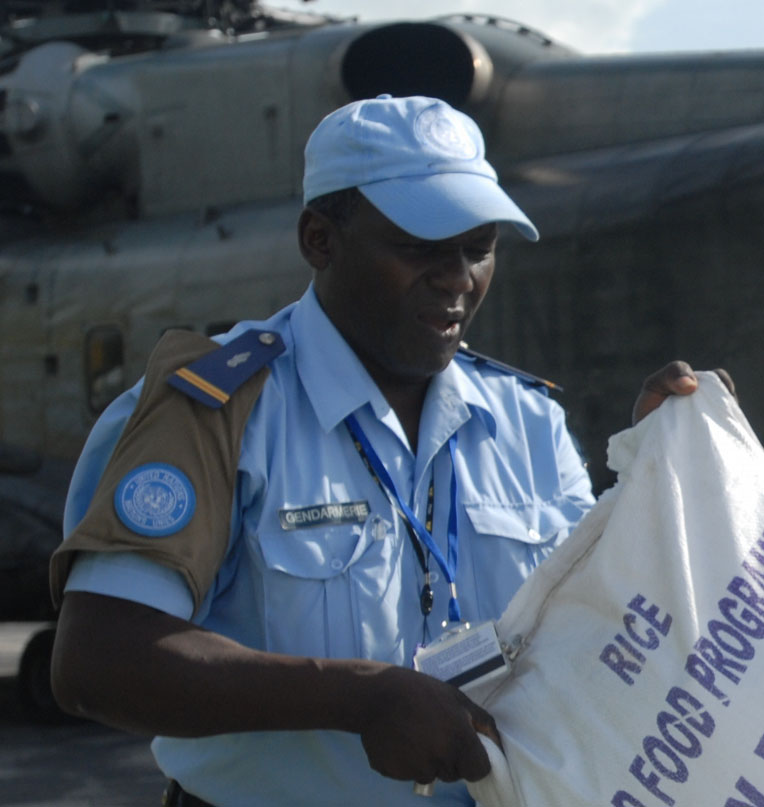
A Haitian National Police officer

Other than the Multinational Security Support (MSS) Mission, the Haitian National Police (Police Nationale d'Haïti, PNH) is the only security force in Haiti following the disbandment of the Haitian military.

== Police Nationale d'Haïti ==
According to the U.S. Department of State, the PNH is an "officially autonomous" civilian force headed by a Director general whose activities are overseen by the Minister of Justice and the Secretary of State for Public Security within the Ministry of Justice. The PNH had approximately 2,000 personnel as of 2006. Specialized units are dedicated to crime response (SWAT), crowd control in Port-au-Prince, security in the Ouest Department, and presidential security. In March 2025, the Haitian government decided enough is enough which will follow one day use the Salvadoran style of the Terrorism Confinement Center (CECOT) to use a heavy crackdown on gangs, the mega-prison will be built and completed within years later to house many gangs with no allowance are made as the police and the military will have to use a new rural isolation in total away from urban areas including the capital Port-au-Prince. Haiti's new mega prison will have strict set of rules for prisoners from sleep deprivation to torture routines as they will strip every human rights on gangsters as they will never be allowed to use phone call, books or even visitors. Prisoners will be forced to eat gruel meal to weaken as there will be no more gang activities in Haiti after they had liberated the capital and provinces to bring the society back to its people. Although officially part of the police force, the Presidential Security Unit operates with its own budget and administration.

During President Bertrand Aristide's second term (2000−4) political appointees took over many key positions in the PNH. In many instances, these appointees lacked security experience and compromised the political neutrality of the force. After Aristide fled the country, the interim president removed 200 corrupt and inexperienced officers in an effort to improve the PNH's effectiveness. New training ensued to teach police officers how to balance security and human rights concerns.

Numerous problems limit the PNH's effectiveness and reliability. Former military personnel exert considerable influence within the police force, and some have begun to push for the reestablishment of the Haitian army. Since its inception, the PNH has suffered from mismanagement, corruption, and a lack of funding. MINUSTAH has helped make up for the shortfalls of the PNH since it arrived in Haiti in 2004. Many security operations have been undertaken jointly by the PNH and MINUSTAH. Rampant crime and gang violence continue to be the most immediate problem facing Haitian authorities.

== International police ==
The International Police is a functional organization made up of police officers from all over the world, serving mostly under the direction of the United Nations, to help train, recruit, and field police forces in war torn countries. The force is usually deployed into a war torn country initially acting as the police, and bringing order. In the process, they recruit and train a local police force, which eventually takes on the responsibilities of enforcing the law and maintaining order, whereas the International Police then take on a supporting role.

Although Haiti isn't a war-torn country, and apart from the recently stabilizing capital enjoys relative peace, civil lawlessness and politically oriented violence have been on an increase along with kidnappings against foreigners, prompting the UN to help the ineffective local police force. To date, International Police forces have been deployed to East Timor, Haiti, Kosovo, Bosnia, Iraq, Afghanistan, Sudan, Liberia, Croatia, and North Macedonia, among others.

The Military of Haiti disbanded in June 1995, but rebels have demanded its re-establishment. The National Police maintains some military units and is actually larger than need be, to be considered a national military, considering the much smaller militaries of neighboring countries.

== Historical secret police organizations ==
- Volontaires de la sécurité nationale (VSN or Tonton Macoutes) (National Security Volunteers)

== See also ==
- Crime in Haiti
