= Brian Concannon =

American human rights lawyer and foreign policy advocate

- Born: Brian Concannon Jr. November 18, 1963 (age 62)
- Education: Middlebury College; Georgetown University Law Center
- Occupations: Human Rights Lawyer and Foreign Policy Advocate
- Years active: 1995–present
- Website: http://blueprint2021.org/

Brian Concannon, Jr. (born November 18, 1963) is an American human rights lawyer and foreign policy advocate. He is the Executive Director of the Institute for Justice & Democracy in Haiti (IJDH), which he co-founded in 2004. Concannon also serves as a member of the Editorial Board of Health and Human Rights: An International Journal at the Harvard School of Public Health, and is a contributor to the Quincy Institute for Responsible Statecraft blog. He is an alumnus of Boston College High School'81, as well as an Ignatius Award winner. He holds an undergraduate degree from Middlebury College and JD from Georgetown Law. He is the recipient of the Wasserstein Public Interest Fellowship from Harvard Law School the Brandeis International Fellowship in Human Rights, Intervention, and International Law and an Honorary Doctorate of Humane Letters from Canisius College. Brian has qualified as an expert witness on country conditions Haiti in over 40 cases in the U.S. and Canada, appearing on behalf of both applicants and the U.S. government.

== Bureau des Avocats Internationaux ==
After working for the United Nations as a Human Rights Officer in 1995–1996, Concannon co-managed the Bureau des Avocats Internationaux (BAI), Haiti's only public interest law office with Mario Joseph between 1996 and 2004. During his time at BAI, Concannon played an essential role in preparing the prosecution of the landmark Raboteau Massacre trial in 2000. As many as 50 people were killed in the Raboteau in 1994. Six years after the slaughter, Concannon and BAI were able to convict 16 defendants guilty for their role in the massacre. The Court also issued a civil damages judgment against the defendants for 1 billion gourdes (roughly $43 million). On May 3, 2005, the Supreme Court overturned the sentences, ruling that "the Criminal Tribunal of Gonaïves, having been established with the assistance of a jury, was not competent to rule the case". A documentary was made about the trial which features extensive interviews with Concannon. BAI was tasked with various other cases during this time period, geared primarily toward seeking justice for the victims of ex-military and paramilitary violence in Haiti (which has been documented in depth), and BAI was also involved in the investigation into the murder of famed Haitian radio journalist Jean Dominique.

== Institute for Justice & Democracy in Haiti ==
In 2004, Concannon left Haiti and returned to the United States to found the Institute for Justice & Democracy in Haiti (IJDH) after the February 2004 coup d'état that overthrew Haiti's president Jean-Bertrand Aristide. IJDH was founded specifically as the sister group of BAI. IJDH and BAI work collaboratively on all their projects. IJDH is based in Boston, Massachusetts.

Concannon successfully represented former Prime Minister and political prisoner Yvon Neptune in the first Haiti case ever decided by the Inter-American Court of Human Rights. In January 2016, Concannon taught a class on human rights at Whitman College. He was also an integral part of the IJDH team that sued the United Nations for their responsibility in bringing cholera to Haiti. The case was dismissed both by the UN and in the NY Federal Court on the basis of UN immunity. In December 2016, the then UN Secretary-General Ban Ki-moon finally apologized for the cholera outbreak in Haiti, saying he was "profoundly sorry" for the outbreak.

The work of Concannon and his colleagues at the BAI and IJDH is the subject of How Human Rights Can Build Haiti by Professor Fran Quigley, and a case study by Harvard University's Project on Justice in Times of Transition.
