= Buteur Métayer =

Haitian gang leader

Buteur Métayer (French pronunciation: [bytœʁ metɛje]; c. 1970 – June 8, 2005) was a gang leader in Haiti during the 2004 Haiti rebellion.

Following the assassination of his brother, Amiot Métayer, in 2003, he became the leader of his brother's gang, then known as the "Cannibal Army". He renamed the gang the "Revolutionary Artibonite Resistance Front" and participated in the seizure of the northern city of Gonaïves at the start of the rebellion against Haitian President Jean-Bertrand Aristide on February 5, 2004. On February 19, he declared himself the president of the "liberated" parts of Haiti as a new state called "Artibonite" and renamed the rebel group again, this time as the National Revolutionary Front for the Liberation of Haiti.

In June 2005, he died of kidney failure in Gonaïves. Some of his supporters claim that he had been poisoned.
