= Immigrants' List =

Immigrants' List is a federal political action committee (PAC) founded in 2006. It is a bipartisan, single-issue PAC focusing on immigration issues. They are in favor of comprehensive immigration reform and policies that would increase due process, judicial review, US visas, legalization, and eliminate the three-year, ten-year, and permanent bars.

== History ==
Immigrants' List was founded by 35 immigration attorneys in October 2006, one month before the 2006 US midterm elections. In their first cycle they supported two candidates, Dave Meijas and Tammy Duckworth, raising over $30,000 for each of them.
