= Antoine Izméry =

Haitian businessman and activist (died 1993)

Antoine Izméry (died 11 September 1993) was a Haitian businessman and pro-democracy activist.

== Career ==
Izméry, who was of Palestinian descent, was among the wealthiest people in Haiti. He was one of the most prominent backers of former President Jean-Bertrand Aristide, and helped finance his election campaign. On the eve of the 1990 elections (which Aristide eventually won), Izméry accused former President of the United States Jimmy Carter of attempting to ensure the victory of Aristide's rival, Marc Bazin. He reportedly caused some consternation in the American camp when he told former US Secretary of State Robert S. McNamara, who was also in attendance, "that [McNamara] would have to take charge of the bloodbath" if Bazin came to power through a rigged election.

When Aristide, having been elected President, was toppled and forced into exile by the 1991 Haitian coup d'état on 30 September 1991, Izméry founded the KOMEVEB (Komite Mete men pou Verite Blayi) organisation, which attempted to discover and publicise the events surrounding the coup and see the return of democratic government. In 1992, Izméry's brother, Georges, was assassinated by a paramilitary death squad associated with the new regime. Antoine Izméry subsequently lodged a complaint with the Inter-American Commission on Human Rights over the death, which sparked a sharply critical resolution from the commission.

== Murder ==
On 11 September 1993, Antoine Izméry attended a mass that had been organised by KOMEVEB to commemorate the 1988 St Jean Bosco massacre, where numerous people had been killed in an attempt on Aristide's life, when he had been a parish priest. Few journalists or human rights advocates dared attend, as there was a strong chance at the time that such a gathering would be attacked by paramilitaries. Izméry told Michael Norton of the Associated Press that he had been warned by the police that there would be bloodshed if the event went ahead. At around 6:00 am, the church was surrounded by armed men in civilian clothing. Numerous journalists were beaten and detained, and placed under the charge of Jackson Joanis, who headed the Port-au-Prince police's feared "Anti-Gang Unit". While this was ongoing, a group of 10 men forced Izméry outside, and made him kneel before shooting him dead with a single bullet to the head.

=== Trial ===
In September 1995, after Aristide had been returned to power, fourteen people, including former paramilitary leader Louis-Jodel Chamblain, and police officers Jackson Joanis and Michel François, were convicted in absentia and sentenced to forced labour for life over Izméry's death. Chamblain soon fled into exile in the Dominican Republic, and Joanis to the United States. Joanis was subsequently deported back to Haiti in 2002, but escaped during the 2004 Haiti rebellion that preceded Aristide's second fall from power.

In early 2004, both Chamblain and Joanis turned themselves in to the new regime, which they were both supporters of, and on 17 August 2004, they were both retried. In a trial lasting only one night, the pair were acquitted. Only one witness testified for the prosecution, and the conduct of the trial came in for sharp international criticism from the Inter-American Commission on Human Rights and Amnesty International. Amnesty International claimed that key witnesses remained in hiding for fear of their lives, that evidence against the men from the first trial had disappeared, and that no attempt had been made to arrest the other twelve men from the original trial.

Izmery is survived by five children, three girls and two boys.

=== Film ===
• Rezistans – a documentary about Antoine Izméry and the resistance against the 1991 coup d’ etat – 1997, in English, 158 min, by Katherine Kean
