= Leopard Corps =

- Corps des Léopards
- Active: 1973–1989
- Country: Haiti
- Allegiance: Jean-Claude Duvalier

The Leopard Corps (French: Corps des Léopards) was the personal security force of Haitian dictator Jean-Claude Duvalier ("Baby Doc") from 1973 to 1989.
