= Amiot Métayer =

Haitian gang leader

- Born: 1968; Gonaïves
- Died: 20 September 2003 (aged 34–35)

Amiot Métayer (French: [amjo metaje]; died 20/21 September 2003) was a gang leader in Haiti. His gang, based in the northern city of Gonaïves, was called the "Cannibal Army". He was also known as "Ti-Cubain" (créole for Little Cuban). Although he had once worked for Haitian President Jean-Bertrand Aristide to put pressure on his political opposition, the government arrested him for arson on May 21, 2002, after pressure from the U.S. government for his acts of violence towards political parties. At the time of his arrest, the Bush administration had been putting constant pressure on the Haitian government to arrest him as well as other such "handymen" that were being employed by Haitian President Jean-Bertrand Aristide. He was, however, freed from jail by members of his gang in August 2002 and proceeded to lead anti-government riots. He was found murdered in September 2003, his body dumped in the bushes, with his heart, liver and eyes missing. His supporters accused Aristide of having ordered his death.

In March 2004, following a successful rebellion against Aristide in February (of which Buteur Métayer, Amio's brother, was a leader), newly appointed Haitian prime minister Gérard Latortue visited Gonaïves and paid tribute to Métayer, calling for a moment of silence to remember him.
