= Emmanuel Constant =

Haitian convicted of crimes against humanity

Emmanuel Constant, nicknamed Toto (French: [emanɥɛl kɔ̃stɑ̃]; born on 27 October 1956), is the founder of FRAPH, a Haitian death squad that terrorized supporters of exiled president Jean-Bertrand Aristide.

In 2001, a Haitian court convicted him in absentia and sentenced him to life in prison for his role as a paramilitary leader in the attack resulting in the Raboteau Massacre.

In 2008, he was convicted in a New York court of mortgage fraud and sentenced to 12–37 years in prison. As of 27 June 2019, Constant was in custody at the Eastern Correctional Facility, a maximum security prison in New York. He was first eligible for parole on 30 June 2016, but was refused; his next parole hearing eligibility date was in February 2020. He was not among 30 Haitians who were deported from the United States to Haiti on 26 May 2020. If and when he is deported, the government plans to arrest him and give him a new trial.

== 1991–1994 ==
In mid-1993, two years after the 1991 Haitian coup d'état, Constant set up paramilitary group known as the Front for the Advancement and Progress of Haïti (FRAPH) to terrorize supporters of exiled president Jean-Bertrand Aristide. A CIA source implicated Constant in the 1993 assassination of Justice Minister Guy Malary, although the agency said the source was "untested".

Constant was paid by the CIA from 1992 to 1994, as were several leading members of the military junta. He provided information to the agency for about $500 a month, according to United States officials and Mr. Constant himself.

== 1994–2005 ==
After the 1994 U.S. and UN-led multinational occupation restored Aristide to power, Constant escaped to the U.S.. He was detained by INS officials in 1995 and prepared to be deported to Haïti to stand trial for involvement in the Raboteau Massacre. In May 1996 the Clinton administration ordered the INS to release Constant.

In 2001, Constant was convicted in absentia of his role in the Raboteau Massacre and sentenced to life in prison and hard labor.

== 2006–present ==
On 7 July 2006, Constant appeared in a Long Island, New York county court to face charges that he participated in a mortgage scheme that defrauded Sun Trust Mortgage Bank and Fremont Investment and Loan of more than $1 million. The purported fraud took place while Constant was employed at Melville Brokerage.

On 28 October 2008, Judge Abraham Gerges of the Kings County Supreme Court sentenced Constant to serve 12–37 years in prison. Judge Gerges concluded his memorandum with a plea that the United States government allow Constant to serve his entire sentence in New York State, rather than return him to Haiti "where he may evade justice due to the instability of the Haitian judicial system." Judge Gerges noted that "it is apparent that the federal authorities may deport him shortly."

In early May 2020 it was announced that the US Immigration and Customs Enforcement was planning to send Constant back to Haiti on a May 12 deportation flight. The Center for Economic and Policy Research obtained a copy of the flight's manifest which included Constant's name and categorized him as a “High Profile Removal". The planned deportation caused a lot of controversy and was later reprieved.

Constant was deported to Haiti on 23 June 2020.
