= Louis-Jodel Chamblain =

Haitian military leader (born 1953 or 1954)

Louis-Jodel Chamblain (born January 18, 1953 or 1954) is a prominent Haitian military figure who has led both government troops and rebels.

== Biography ==
Chamblain was a sergeant in the Haitian Army and served in the Leopard Corps until 1989 or 1990. He first emerged as a notorious figure as a sergeant within the transitional military junta running Haïti following the collapse of Jean-Claude Duvalier's dictatorship in 1986. In 1987, Chamblain allegedly headed government death squads that attacked voters at the 1987 presidential election, causing it to be cancelled; the election was to permit transition to civilian rule.

Civilian elections did take place in 1990 (Haitian general election, 1990–1991), in which Jean-Bertrand Aristide was elected, but the 1991 Haitian coup d'état, in which Chamblain was involved, overthrew Aristide just eight months later. Immediately following the coup, Chamblain's reputation for brutality grew further as he is reported to have been responsible for thousands of murders of Aristide followers.

Chamblain was second-in-command of a paramilitary organization, the Front for the Advancement and Progress of Haïti (FRAPH), founded in August 1993 as tensions grew between supporters of Aristide's reinstatement and supporters of the military government. With the end of the military regime and restoration of Aristide (following the U.S. Operation Uphold Democracy intervention) in 1994, Chamblain went into exile in the Dominican Republic. He was convicted in absentia for his involvement in the murder of Antoine Izméry, a well-known pro-democracy activist, and for his involvement in the Raboteau Massacre.

Chamblain returned from exile in late 2003 or early 2004 to take part in a new rebellion against Aristide. Shortly after his return, he captured the central city of Hinche from the Haitian police with a force of 50 men.

Following Chamblain's return and the collapse of Aristide's government in 2004, Amnesty International called for UN peacekeepers to arrest Chamblain for his alleged participation in various war crimes in 1987, 1991, and 1993-1994. In April 2004, he turned himself in to face a retrial in the case of Izméry's murder and was acquitted; he was eventually released from prison in August 2005.

Chamblain appeared together with Jean-Claude Duvalier as his chief-of-security on Duvalier's return from exile on 16 January 2011.
