= Front for the Advancement and Progress of Haïti =

Paramilitary group organized in 1993

Front for the Advancement and Progress of Haiti
- Front pour l'Avancement et le Progrès Haïtien
- Other name: FRAPH
- Leaders: Emmanuel Constant, Louis-Jodel Chamblain, Jean-Pierre Baptiste
- Founded: 1993
- Dissolved: 2005
- Allegiance: Armed Forces of Haiti
- Active regions: Haiti
- Ideology: Duvalierism, neo-fascism, anti-communism, anti-Americanism

The Front for the Advancement and Progress of Haiti (also known in French as Front pour l'Avancement et le Progrès Haitien, FRAPH) was a far-right paramilitary group organized in mid-1993. Its goal was to undermine support for the popular Catholic priest Jean-Bertrand Aristide, who served less than eight months as Haïti's president before being deposed, on 29 September 1991, by a coup. The group received covert support and funding from the United States government. The FRAPH was led by Emmanuel Constant, Jean-Pierre Baptiste, and Louis-Jodel Chamblain (Deputy of Constant and later founding member of the National Reconstruction Front). Michel François was not a member but was affiliated with the FRAPH (he was also associated with Michel Martelly). The FRAPH was seen as an Duvalierist and neo-fascist organization. In October 1994 they began to embrace anti-Americanism.

== The formation of FRAPH ==
FRAPH was established by Emmanuel "Toto" Constant, who went on the Central Intelligence Agency payroll as an informant and spy in early 1992 (according to the Agency, this relationship ended in mid-1994, but the following October the US embassy in Haïti was openly acknowledging that Constant – now a born-again democrat – was on its payroll). According to Constant, shortly after Aristide's ouster, Colonel Patrick Collins, a U.S. Defense Intelligence Agency (DIA), attache who was stationed in Haiti from 1989 to 1992, pressured him to organize a front that could oppose the Aristide movement and do intelligence work against it.

== U.S. involvement in Haiti ==
During the 1992 U.S. presidential campaign, candidate Bill Clinton had promised to restore democracy to Haiti if elected. Inaugurated in 1993, the administration had to deal with a continuing refugee problem in Florida. Condemning FRAPH and the military regime as nothing more than "armed thugs," the administration cooperated with a multinational force and dispatched 15,000 troops sent and a high-level negotiating team (Jimmy Carter, Sam Nunn, and Colin Powell) to force the military to step down, restoring Aristide to power in August 1994 after international sanctions and pressure had failed to produce any results. Although the presence of U.S. and UN peacekeepers helped restore calm and security, this success, claims researcher Lisa A. McGowan, was undermined by their refusal to disarm the disbanded Haitian military and paramilitaries. As McGowan wrote,

"[USAID] is providing funding and technical assistance to strengthen Haiti’s judicial system, yet the U.S. has refused Haitian government requests to deport FRAPH leader Constant, who was imprisoned in the U.S. and wanted in Haiti on murder charges. Instead, the U.S. Justice Department released him from prison. Furthermore, the Clinton administration refuses to give the Haitian government uncensored copies of the documents seized from FRAPH headquarters, raising suspicions that the documents contain incriminating information about CIA and other U.S. collaboration with Haitian paramilitaries. Documents that were obtained revealed, for example, that the CIA knew that Constant was directly implicated in the 1993 murder of Justice Minister Guy Malory, yet kept him on their payroll until the return of Aristide in 1994."

It subsequently emerged that the US government had in fact played a significant role in establishing and funding FRAPH. The investigative journalist Allan Nairn broke the story in an article published in The Nation in 1994. Nairn based his findings on interviews with military, paramilitary and intelligence officials in Haïti and the United States as well as Green Beret commanders and internal documents from the U.S. and Haitian armies. Nairn spoke directly with Constant himself, then being held in a Maryland jail, shortly before he was due to be deported to Haïti. According to Constant, he started the group that became FRAPH at the urging of the Defense Intelligence Agency (DIA), and that even after the U.S. occupation got under way in September 1994, "other people from [his] organization were working with the DIA", aiding in operations directed against "subversive activities".

In February 1996, the New York-based Center for Constitutional Rights (CCR) announced that it had obtained thousands of pages of newly declassified U.S. documents, which they claim revealed that the U.S. government recognized the brutal nature of FRAPH but denied it in public. Describing the attitude of US government officials, CCR lawyer Michael Ratner said

"they were talking out of both sides of their mouth. They were talking about restoring democracy to Haïti, but at the same time, they were undermining democracy in the coup period – at times supporting a group that committed terrorist acts against the Haitian people."

According to Ratner, U.S. suspicions of Aristide's leftist populism prodded them to seek support from even the most brutal anti-Aristide elements. Observers such as Ratner, Nairn and Lisa McGowan have argued that covert assistance to antidemocratic forces such as FRAPH was used to pressure Aristide into abandoning his ambitious program for social reform and adopt harsh economic reforms when the U.S. returned him to power.

== Bibliography ==
- Grann, David. "Giving 'The Devil' His Due." The Atlantic Monthly, June 2001.
- Whitney, Kathleen Marie (1996), "Sin, Fraph, and the CIA: U.S. Covert Action in Haiti", Southwestern Journal of Law and Trade in the Americas, Vol. 3, Issue 2 (1996), pp. 303–332.
