= Hugh Shelton =

American general (born 1942)

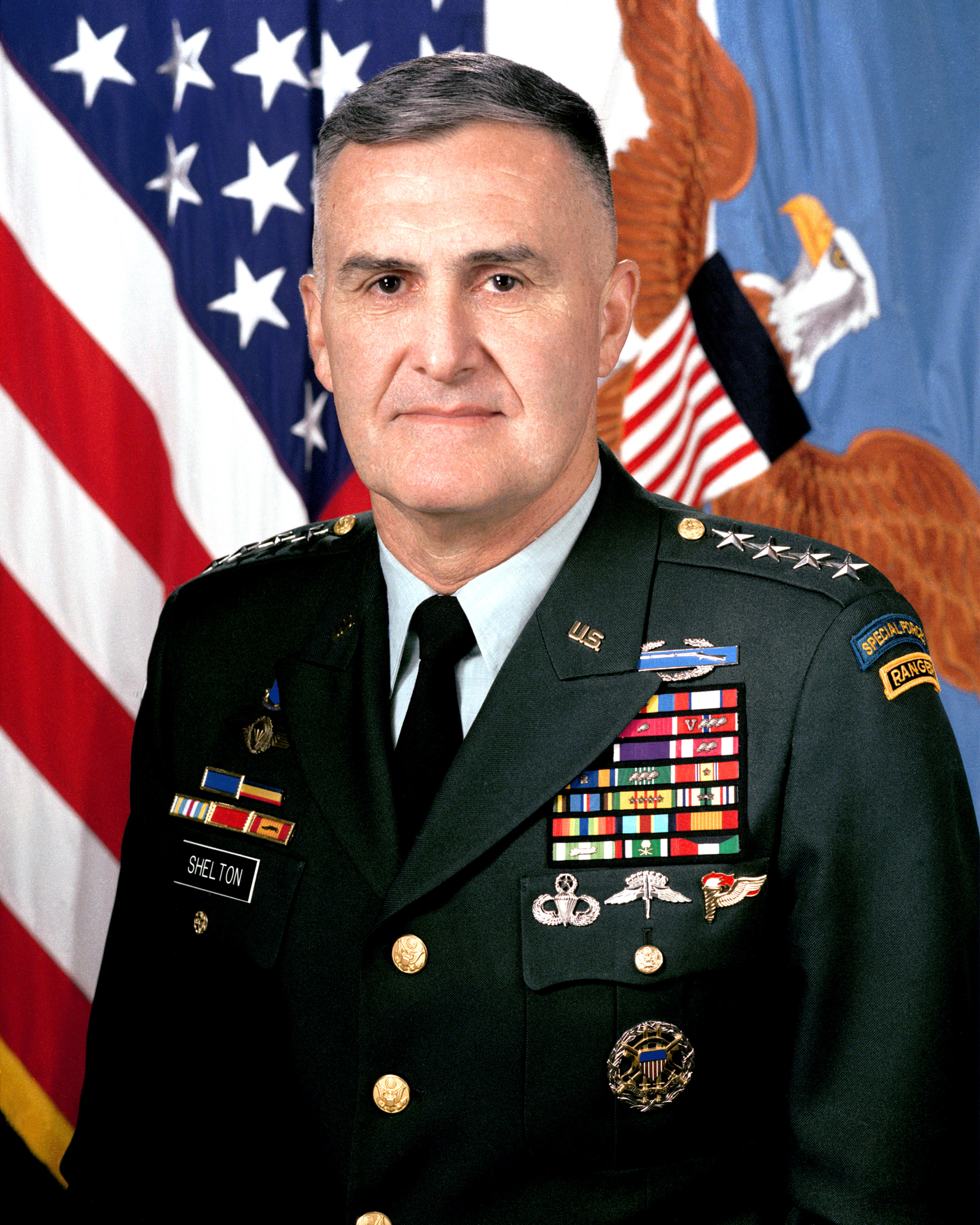
- Official portrait, 1999
- Born: Henry Hugh Shelton; 2 January 1942 (age 84); Tarboro, North Carolina, U.S.
- Education: North Carolina State University (BS); Auburn University at Montgomery (MS)
- Military career
- Allegiance: United States
- Branch: United States Army
- Service years: 1963–2001
- Rank: General
- Commands: Chairman of the Joint Chiefs of Staff; United States Special Operations Command; XVIII Airborne Corps; 82nd Airborne Division; 1st Brigade, 82nd Airborne Division; 1st Battalion, 60th Infantry Regiment
- Conflicts: Vietnam War; Gulf War; Operation Uphold Democracy; Iraqi no-fly zones conflict; Operation Desert Fox; Kosovo War; Operation Allied Force
- Awards: Defense Distinguished Service Medal (4); Army Distinguished Service Medal (3); Legion of Merit (2); Bronze Star Medal (4, with valor); Purple Heart; Congressional Gold Medal

Henry Hugh Shelton (born 2 January 1942) is an American retired general who served as the 14th chairman of the Joint Chiefs of Staff from 1997 to 2001. Shelton was born in North Carolina. After graduating from North Carolina State University, where he was a member of the Pershing Rifles and the Army Reserve Officers' Training Corps, he was commissioned in 1963 as an infantry officer. Shelton initially served in the Army Reserve. After applying for active duty, he underwent Special Forces training and had two deployments for the Vietnam War, where he led Special Forces and infantry units. While serving there from 1966 to 1967, Shelton was awarded the Bronze Star with valor and the Purple Heart. He was later there as a company commander and staff officer from 1969 to 1970. Shelton received a master's degree from Auburn University at Montgomery in 1973.

His later notable assignments included as commander of the 3rd Battalion, 60th Infantry Regiment, from 1979 to 1981; and the 1st Brigade, 82nd Airborne Division, from 1983 to 1985. Shelton was the deputy director for the National Military Command Center and for current operations of the Joint Staff between 1987 and 1989. He later served in Saudi Arabia and Iraq while deployed for the Gulf War, during his time as assistant division commander for operations of the 101st Airborne Division. Shelton commanded the 82nd Airborne Division from 1991 until 1993, when he took command of the XVIII Airborne Corps until 1996. While serving as the corps commander, he led the Joint Task Force for Operation Uphold Democracy in 1994, which facilitated the removal of the military government in Haiti and the restoration of the country's elected president.

In 1996, Shelton was appointed as commander-in-chief of the United States Special Operations Command. He was nominated to serve as chairman of the Joint Chiefs of Staff by President Bill Clinton in 1997. While serving in that role, in 1998 Shelton was involved in Operation Desert Fox against Saddam Hussein's Iraq and Operation Infinite Reach against al-Qaeda. He led the planning for the NATO intervention in the Kosovo War in 1999. After the 11 September 2001 attacks, Shelton spent the final weeks of his term coordinating efforts against al-Qaeda and the Taliban, and developing the strategy for the war on terror. Shelton retired from the United States Army on 30 September 2001. He later served on the board of several organizations, and advised the John Edwards 2004 presidential campaign.

== Early life, family and education ==
Henry Hugh Shelton was born in Tarboro, North Carolina on 2 January 1942, and graduated from North Edgecombe High School in 1959. Shelton attended North Carolina State University, and was a member of Pershing Rifles. He earned a Bachelor of Science degree in textile engineering in June 1963 while earning his United States Army commission through Reserve Officers' Training Corps training. He was commissioned as a second lieutenant of infantry in the Army Reserve.

Shelton's further education includes a Master of Science degree in political science from Auburn University at Montgomery in 1973 as well as studies at the Air Command and Staff College from August 1972 to June 1973 and the National War College from June 1982 to June 1983. Shelton married Carolyn L. Johnson in 1963; the pair have three sons together.

== Early military career ==
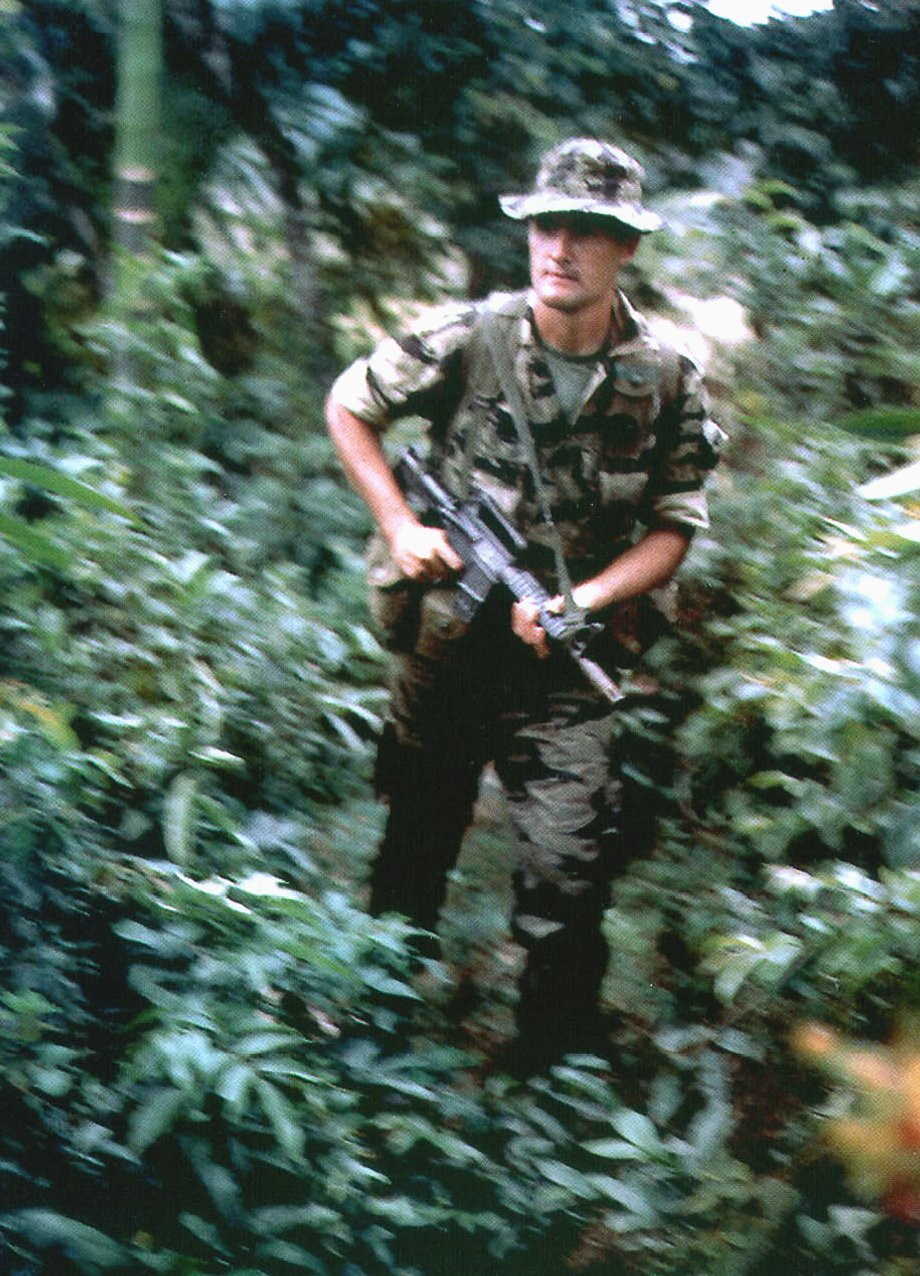
Shelton on patrol in Vietnam, 1967

As a second lieutenant Shelton spent two years at Fort Benning, Georgia, as a platoon leader with the 2nd Infantry Division and the 1st Cavalry Division. While there, he also completed Ranger School and Airborne School, and was promoted to first lieutenant. Being a reservist, Shelton briefly returned to civilian life in July 1965, but decided that he liked the Army, and applied for active duty in the Regular Army in 1966. Shelton served two tours of duty in the Vietnam War with the 5th Special Forces Group, and with the 173rd Airborne Brigade.

After completing Special Forces training at Fort Bragg, North Carolina, Shelton served in South Vietnam from September 1966 to December 1967. He was stationed along the Ho Chi Minh Trail to prevent Viet Cong from entering the country through Laos. Promoted to captain in March 1967, starting in July he commanded Detachment A-104, 5th SFG, in Quang Ngai Province, where they worked with the Army of the Republic of Vietnam Special Forces and local Montagnard tribesmen. Shelton was awarded a Bronze Star with valor for leading a successful counterattack against VC that ambushed a South Vietnamese patrol, and a Purple Heart after being wounded in the leg by a poisoned stake. Shelton then served at the US Army Training Center at Fort Jackson, South Carolina, before returning to South Vietnam in January 1969. Assigned to the 173rd Airborne Brigade, he was initially an intelligence officer before commanding Company C, 4th Battalion, 503rd Infantry Regiment, and later serving as the acting battalion operations officer.

Shelton was stationed at Fort Benning from March 1970 to July 1972, initially to take the Infantry Officer Advanced Course, before becoming an instructor and operations officer in the Ranger Department. In 1973, he graduated from the Air Command and Staff College and Auburn University (both in Alabama), and then served in multiple assignments with the 25th Infantry Division at Fort Shafter, Hawaii. These included as a brigade adjutant and operations officer, deputy division adjutant, and infantry battalion executive officer (the latter in 1st Battalion, 14th Infantry, 2nd Brigade). He was promoted to major in February 1974. From June 1977 to April 1979, he served at the Army Military Personnel Center handling assignments for other majors. Promoted to lieutenant colonel in November 1978, Shelton then served as commander of 3rd Battalion, 60th Infantry Regiment, 9th Infantry Division, at Fort Lewis, Wash. In June 1981 he became the division assistant chief of staff for operations (G-3).

== Senior military career ==
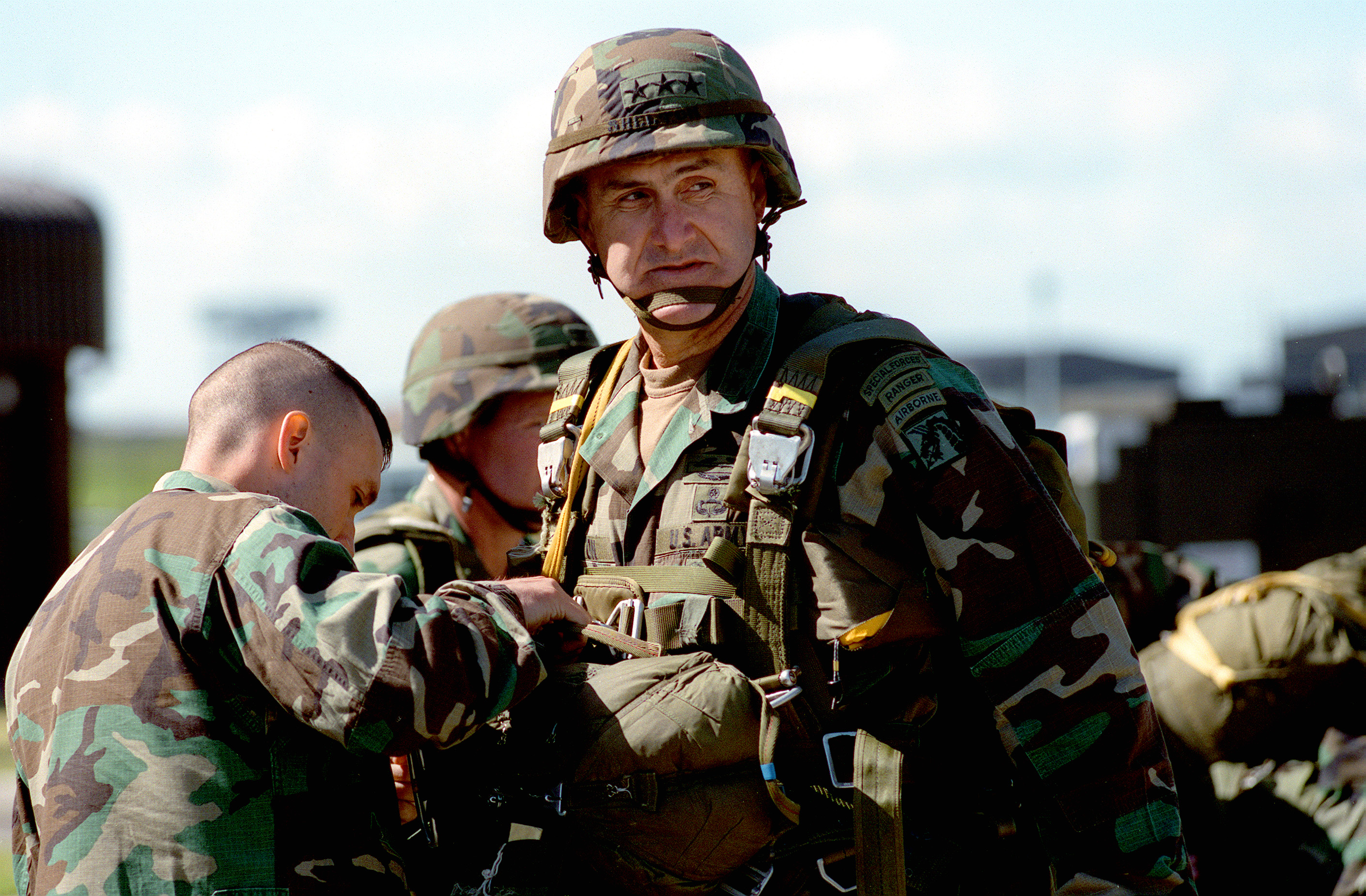
Shelton in France at the 50th anniversary of the Normandy landings, June 1994

He attended the National War College in 1982 and 1983 before briefly serving on the Army Staff in the Pentagon from June 1983. Shelton was assigned to the Reserve Components Study Group in the Office of the Deputy Chief of Staff for Personnel. Promoted to colonel in October 1983, Shelton became the commander of the 1st Brigade, 82nd Airborne Division, Fort Bragg. In this role, he directed several combined arms task forces for overseas deployments, before becoming the chief of staff, 10th Mountain Division (Light), at Fort Drum, New York, in November 1985. Promoted to brigadier general in August 1988, Shelton served as deputy director of the National Military Command Center and then as the deputy director for operations of the Joint Staff, J-3, from July 1987 to July 1989.

He then began serving as assistant division commander for operations, 101st Airborne Division (Air Assault), Fort Campbell, Kentucky. That assignment included a seven-month deployment to Saudi Arabia for the Gulf War, during Operation Desert Shield/Desert Storm. He led division forces in a helicopter assault inside Iraq. After returning to the US in May 1991, Shelton was assigned to command the 82nd Airborne Division at Fort Bragg in his home state of North Carolina, and was promoted to major general in October.

In June 1993, he was promoted to lieutenant general and given command of XVIII Airborne Corps. While serving as the corps commander, Shelton led the Joint Task Force responsible for Operation Uphold Democracy in Haiti. On 19 September 1994, Shelton arrived in Port-au-Prince with the first of the 15,000 American troops dispatched to the country, intending to meet with Haitian military leader Lt. Gen. Raoul Cédras. Cédras had agreed to restore power to the elected president Jean-Bertrand Aristide in a last-minute negotiation led by Jimmy Carter, and Shelton's mission turned from an invasion to ensuring a political transition. On 25 September, he and Cédras visited Cap-Haïtien, a city where US Marines got into a firefight that killed ten Haitians. The two of them later toured military garrisons across Haiti to ensure that the operation continued without any further incidents. The US forces under Shelton temporarily took charge of the country and proceeded to disarm Haitian troops.

Shelton presided over a change of command ceremony of the Armed Forces of Haiti on 15 October 1994, where Cédras relinquished command to Maj. Gen. Jean-Claude Duperval, prior to leaving the country for exile and allowing Aristide's return. The civilian government of Haiti was restored, and Shelton returned to North Carolina as of early November 1994. The US troops that were deployed also worked on logistical and construction projects before handing over authority to the United Nations Mission in Haiti. On 29 February 1996, Shelton assumed the position of Commander-in-Chief of United States Special Operations Command (SOCOM) at MacDill Air Force Base, Florida. He was promoted to the rank of general on 1 March 1996. In that role, he oversaw the largest ever commitment of special operations forces during peacekeeping missions in the Balkans.

=== Chairman of the Joint Chiefs of Staff ===
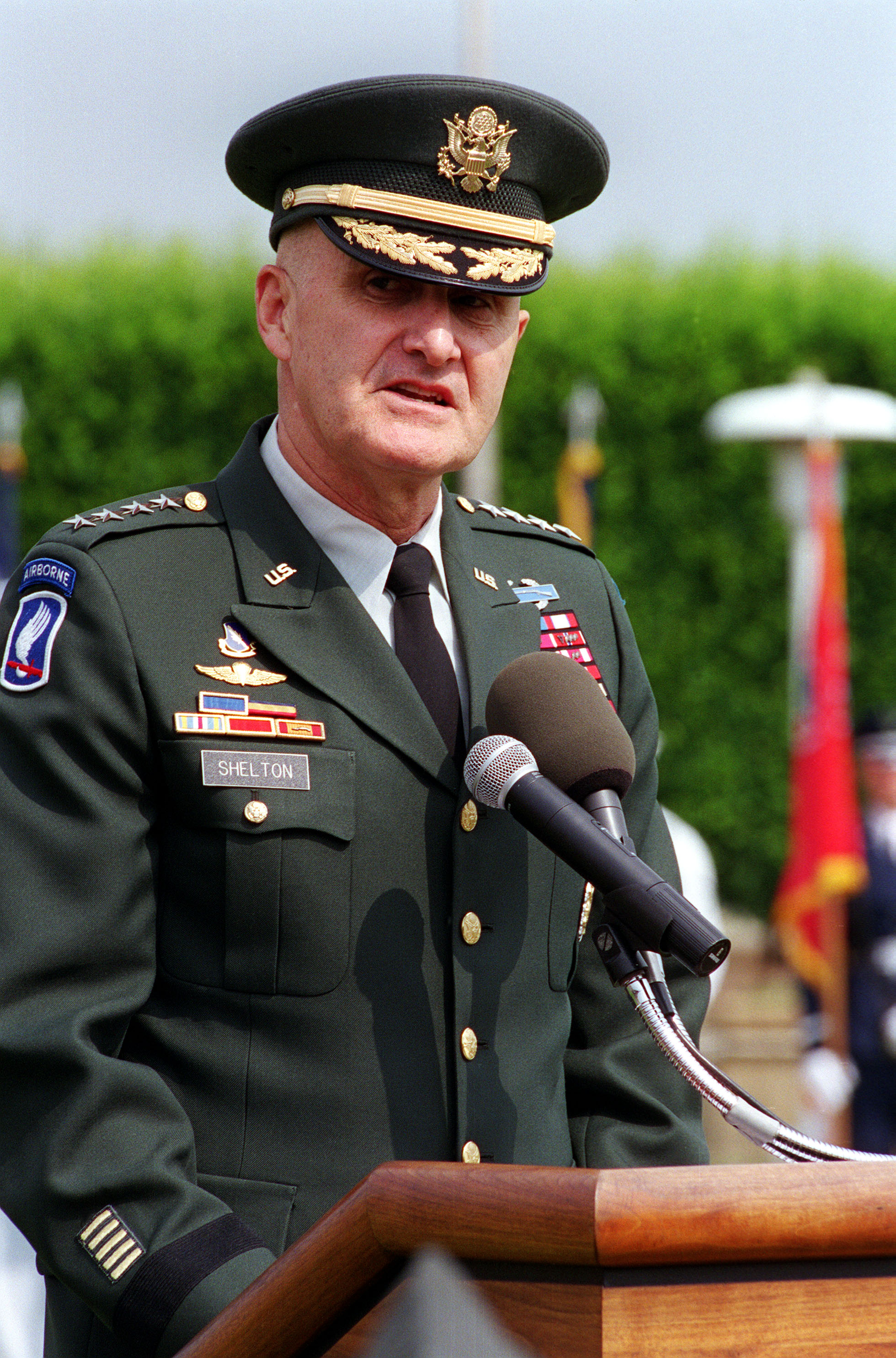
Shelton speaking at the 50th Anniversary of Armed Forces Day, May 2000

On 17 July 1997, Shelton was nominated by President Bill Clinton to become the 14th chairman of the Joint Chiefs of Staff. At his Senate confirmation hearing, Shelton acknowledged that the US needed an exit strategy from Bosnia, where troops were deployed as peacekeepers. After the retirement of General John Shalikashvili, Shelton took office as chairman on 1 October 1997. He was the first chairman to have a background in special operations, which fit with Defense Secretary William Cohen's interest in unconventional warfare. Shelton took office amidst peacekeeping missions in the Balkans and counter-drug operations in Latin America.

Shelton oversaw Operation Infinite Reach in August 1998, airstrikes on an al-Qaeda camp in Afghanistan and a pharmaceutical factory in Sudan. He claimed that the group had "been actively seeking to acquire weapons of mass destruction, including chemical weapons for use against US citizens and our interests around the world." Also that year, he regularly met with Clinton to discuss the containment of Saddam Hussein's Iraq. In November 1998, a bombing campaign was planned against Iraq but was called off at the last minute, with Shelton being told to cancel it by National Security Advisor Sandy Berger. In December 1998, they launched Operation Desert Fox, which consisted of 600 airstrikes on Iraqi targets over the course of four days, intended to weaken the Iraqi military.

Shelton led the planning of the NATO intervention in the Kosovo War in 1999. During the Incident at Pristina Airport in June, Shelton opposed the move by NATO Supreme Allied Commander Europe, General Wesley Clark, to have a confrontation with Russian troops that arrived in Kosovo. Not long after, a decision was made by Cohen and Shelton for Clark to retire from his post early. Shelton notified Clark by phone call, and told him that the Pentagon already decided on his replacement. In his memoir, Clark accused Shelton and Army chief of staff Dennis Reimer of undermining his efforts in Kosovo. Later Shelton coined the phrase "Dover test", testing the support for a war based on the reaction of the people after seeing American casualties returning at the Dover Air Force Base.

Shelton at a press conference with Donald Rumsfeld on 11 September 2001

In October 1999, based on his recommendation, the United States Atlantic Command was replaced by the Joint Forces Command, to oversee the development of doctrine on the deployment of US-based forces overseas. In May 2000 he released "Joint Vision 2020: America's Military—Preparing for Tomorrow," which identified asymmetric threats as the largest near-term danger to the country, and advocated for the military to be transformed to dominate the full spectrum of future conflicts. When the new administration took office in January 2001, Shelton worked with Defense Secretary Donald Rumsfeld for his vision of a rapidly reforming the military to meet 21st century challenges.

During the events of 11 September 2001, Shelton was flying on-board a Boeing C-135 Speckled Trout, traveling to a NATO meeting in Europe, but turned back and returned to Washington. Upon entering the United States Airspace, the C-135 flew past the World Trade Center so Shelton was able to assess the situation following the attack. Already scheduled to retire in October, Shelton spent his last weeks in office coordinating military plans to destroy al-Qaeda and Taliban forces in Afghanistan and helping to develop an interagency strategy to defeat, disrupt, and degrade terrorist activities around the world. These would form the basis of Operation Enduring Freedom and the global war on terror. At the end of his term, Shelton retired from the Army on 30 September 2001.

== Post-military career ==
In 2002 Shelton founded the General Hugh Shelton Leadership Center at North Carolina State University. The center was created to "inspire, educate, and develop values-based leaders, both locally and globally, committed to personal integrity, professional ethics, and selfless service."

In his retirement, Shelton joined the Board of Directors of Red Hat in April 2003, and was elected that board's chairman in 2010. He also holds directorships at Anheuser Busch, Anteon International and Protective Products of America. At his alma mater of North Carolina State University, the General Hugh Shelton Leadership Center was founded in 2002, which grants scholarships to people who are committed to personal integrity, professional ethics, and selfless service.

Shelton also served as an advisor to Senator John Edwards' presidential campaign from 2003 to 2004. Shelton created a minor controversy for 2004 Democratic presidential candidate, retired U.S. Army General Wesley Clark, a subordinate of Shelton's during the 1999 Kosovo military actions, when he stated: "I will tell you the reason [Clark] came out of Europe early had to do with integrity and character issues, things that are very near and dear to my heart. I'll just say Wes won't get my vote," casting doubt upon Clark's candidacy.

On 1 March 2008, Shelton announced his endorsement of Senator Hillary Clinton for the 2008 Democratic Presidential Primary, stating, "I've been with Senator Clinton when she has been with our military men and women. I know from those experiences that she understands the demands and sacrifice of military life. I am confident she will always put the readiness and well being of our troops first. She is ready to be Commander-in-Chief." Shelton was the second Chairman of the Joint Chiefs of Staff to endorse Clinton, the first being General John Shalikashvili.

On 12 October 2010, Shelton published his autobiography, Without Hesitation: The Odyssey of an American Warrior, along with coauthors Ron Levinson and Malcolm McConnell. An excerpt tells the story of a high-ranking Clinton Cabinet member proposing that Shelton intentionally allow an American pilot to be killed by the Iraqis to have an excuse to retaliate and go to war. The book also tells of Bill Clinton's tearful confession to Shelton; a time during the Clinton administration when a close Clinton aide lost possession of the biscuit (top secret presidential nuclear launch authorization codes); details of a contentious Camp David meeting among George W. Bush and his National Security Council immediately after 9/11, where internal battle lines were drawn. His book also says there were multiple attempts to kill Osama bin Laden that were shot down by Madeleine Albright.

On 27 August 2010, a statue of Shelton was unveiled and dedicated at the Airborne Special Operations Museum in Fayetteville, NC. The statue was commissioned and donated by H. Ross Perot.

On 24 October 2010, Shelton appeared on This Week with Christiane Amanpour, on 6 December 2010, on The Daily Show with Jon Stewart, and on 30 December 2010, on The Charlie Rose Show on PBS and Bloomberg TV, to promote the publication of his memoir.

On 20 October 2012, Shelton was honored at the 6th Annual Brian & Kendra's Bluegrass Party in Speed, North Carolina. He was presented with a Distinguished Achievements plaque and a roadside display at the entrance of Speed, honoring his hometown and acknowledging his achievements.

Shelton and his wife, Carolyn, established the Hugh and Carolyn Shelton Military Neurotrauma Foundation in 2005 to fund research into traumatic brain injury among military personnel.

== Dates of rank ==
Rank	Date
Second lieutenant	19 September 1964*
First lieutenant	7 January 1965
Captain	19 March 1967
Major	7 February 1974
Lieutenant colonel	6 November 1978
Colonel	1 October 1983
Brigadier general	1 August 1988
Major general	1 October 1991
Lieutenant general	7 June 1993
General	1 March 1996

* - Date of rank adjusted for time not spent on active duty. Receipt of officer's commission in June 1963.

== Decorations and badges ==
Shelton's decorations and medals include:

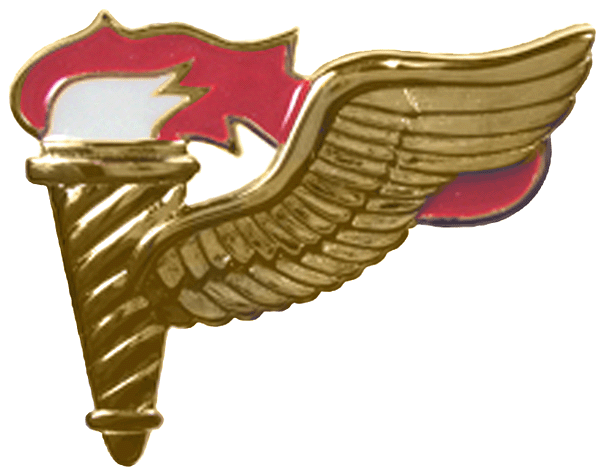

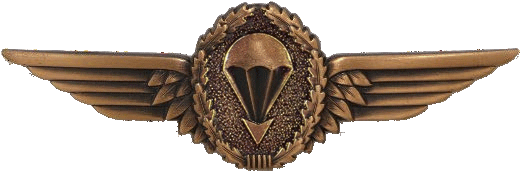

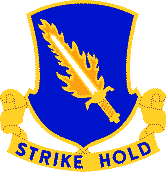

Badge	Combat Infantryman Badge			
Badge	Master Parachutist Badge			
Badge	Special Forces Tab		Ranger Tab	
1st Row Awards	Defense Distinguished Service Medal w/ 3 oak leaf clusters		Distinguished Service Medal w/ 2 oak leaf clusters	
2nd Row Awards	Legion of Merit w/ 1 oak leaf clusters	Bronze Star w valor device & 3 oak leaf clusters	Purple Heart	Meritorious Service Medal w/ 2 oak leaf clusters
3rd Row Awards	Air Medal w/ "2" device	Army Commendation Medal w/ 3 oak leaf clusters	National Defense Service Medal w/ 2 service stars	Armed Forces Expeditionary Medal
4th Row Awards	Vietnam Service Medal w/ 4 bronze service star	Southwest Asia Service Medal w/ 2 service stars	Army Service Ribbon	Army Overseas Service Ribbon
5th Row Awards	Vietnam Gallantry Cross w/ bronze star	Vietnam Campaign Medal	Kuwait Liberation Medal (Saudi Arabia)	Kuwait Liberation Medal
Badge	Pathfinder Badge		Military Free Fall Parachute Badge	
Badge	Office of the Joint Chiefs of Staff Identification Badge		Air Assault Badge	
Badge	Navy and Marine Corps Parachutist Insignia		German Parachutist Badge in bronze	
Badge	504th Infantry Regiment Distinctive unit insignia			
Unit awards	US Army Presidential Unit Citation		US Navy Presidential Unit Citation	Joint Meritorious Unit Award
Unit awards	Meritorious Unit Commendation		Vietnam Gallantry Cross Unit Citation	Vietnam Civil Actions Medal Unit Citation

=== Other recognition ===
In 1998, Shelton received the Golden Plate Award of the American Academy of Achievement presented by Awards Council members General Colin L. Powell and General John M. Shalikashvili.

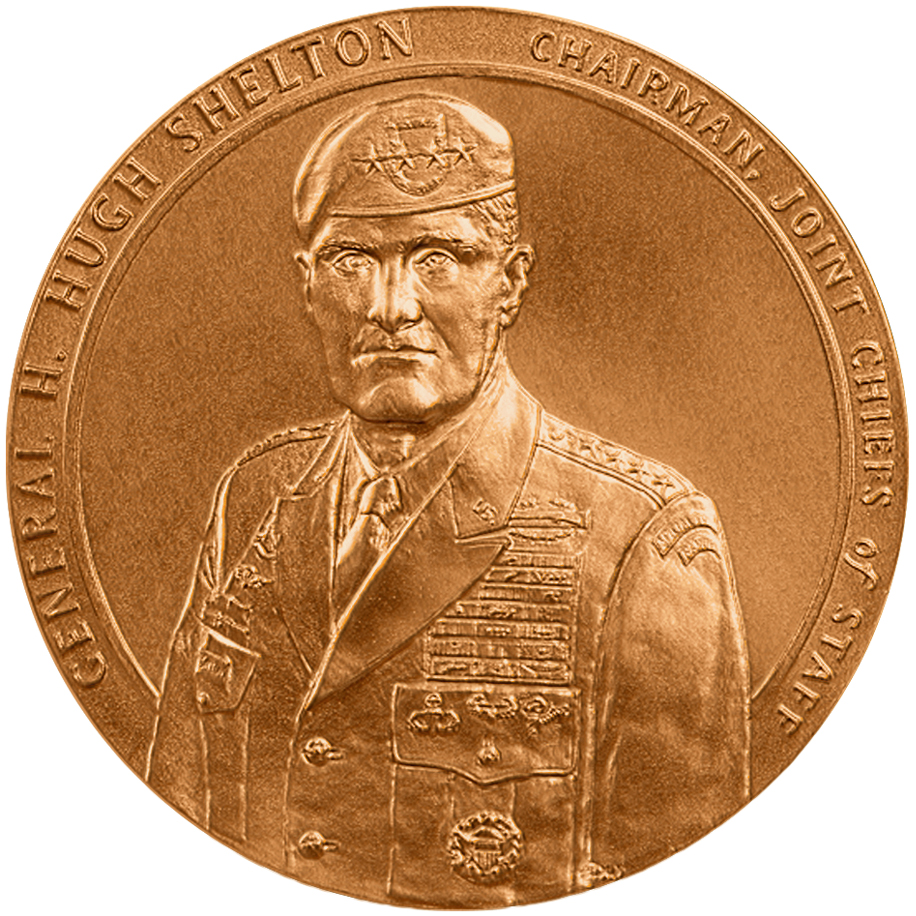

In 2002, Shelton received the Congressional Gold Medal. The citation says, "Throughout his 38 years of service to his country, his ascent through the ranks of the Army, two tours in Vietnam and duty in Operation Desert Storm, Gen. Shelton has carried with him the North Carolina values of service, sacrifice, love of family, faith in God and devotion to country."

In 2011, The Command and General Staff College Foundation presented retired General Hugh Shelton with the Foundation's 2011 Distinguished Leadership Award.

Military offices
Preceded by James H. Johnson	Commanding General of the 82nd Airborne Division; 1991–1993	Succeeded by William M. Steele
Preceded by Gary E. Luck	Commander of the XVIII Airborne Corps; 1993–1996	Succeeded by Jack Keane
Preceded by Wayne A. Downing	Commander-in-Chief of the United States Special Operations Command; 1996–1997	Succeeded by Raymond C. Smith; Acting
Preceded by John Shalikashvili	Chairman of the Joint Chiefs of Staff; 1997–2001	Succeeded by Richard Myers
U.S. order of precedence (ceremonial)
Preceded by	Order of precedence of the United States as Former Chair of the Joint Chiefs of Staff	Succeeded by Richard Myers as Former Chair of the Joint Chiefs of Staff
