= Jodel Lessage =

Haitian military officer

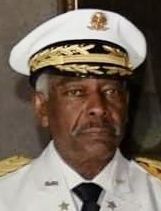
- Lessage in 2023

Commander-in-Chief of the Armed Forces of Haiti
- In office 17 November 2017 – 20 August 2024
- Preceded by: (Armed Forces Disbanned)
- Succeeded by: Lt. Gen. Derby Guerrier

Personal details
- Born: 19 February 1954 (age 72) Haiti

Military service
- Allegiance: Haiti
- Branch/service: Haitian Army
- Years of service: 1976–1995; 2017–2024
- Rank: Lieutenant general
- Unit: Corps des Léopards (disbanned)

Jodel Lessage (born February 19, 1954) is a Haitian military officer, who served as the acting Commander-in-Chief of the Armed Forces of Haiti from 17 November 2017 to 20 August 2024. He is the first Commander-in-Chief following the re-establishment of the Armed Forces after 22 years and their disbandment in 1995, during the Operation Uphold Democracy.

Military offices
Vacant Title last held by Bernardin Poisson	Commander-in-Chief of the Armed Forces of Haiti; Acting; 2017–2024	Succeeded by Derby Guerrier; Acting
