= Bernardin Poisson =

Haitian military officer

- Born: 16 February 1948 (age 78); Haiti
- Military career
- Allegiance: Haiti
- Branch: Haitian Army
- Service years: ?–1995
- Rank: Brigadier General
- Commands: Commander-in-Chief of the Armed Forces of Haiti

Bernardin Poisson (born 16 February 1948) is a retired Haitian military officer, who served as the Commander-in-Chief of the Armed Forces of Haiti from 17 November 1994 to 20 February 1995, during the Operation Uphold Democracy. He had served as the head of the Port-au-Prince fire department prior to his appointment.

Military offices
Preceded by Jean-Claude Duperval; Acting	Commander-in-Chief of the Armed Forces of Haiti; 1994–1995	Vacant Title next held by Jodel Lesage; Acting
