= List of commanders-in-chief of the Armed Forces of Haiti =

Commander-in-Chief of the Armed Forces of Haiti
- Commandant en chef des Forces armées d'Haïti; Kòmandan an chèf Fòs Ame d'Ayiti
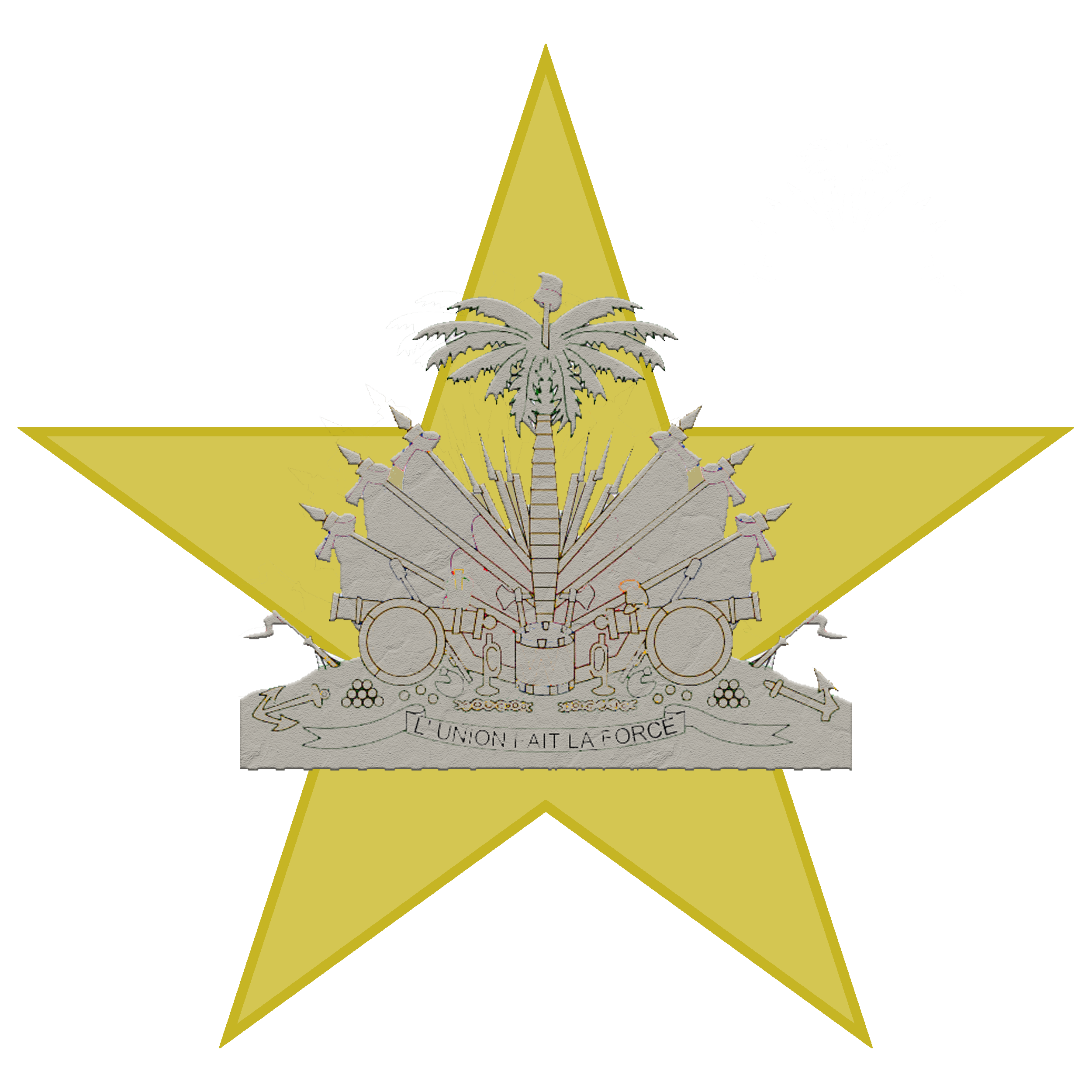
- Insignia of the General Staff of the Armed Forces of Haiti
- Incumbent; Lieutenant general Derby Guerrier; Acting since 20 August 2024
- Armed Forces of Haiti; Ministry of Defense
- Reports to: Minister of Defense
- Seat: Grand Quartier Général des Forces Armées d'Haiti, Port-au-Prince
- Appointer: President of Haiti
- Formation: 1 August 1934; 92 years ago (Note: Commander of the Guard of Haiti.)
- First holder: Colonel Démosthènes Pétrus Calixte

This article lists the commanders-in-chief of the Armed Forces of Haiti (French: Forces Armées d'Haïti—FAd'H; Haitian Creole: Fòs Ame d'Ayiti), from the end of the U.S. occupation in 1934 through the disbandment of the FAd'H in 1995, during the Operation Uphold Democracy, until the reinstatement of the FAd'H in 2017.

== Officeholders ==
=== Commanders of the Guard of Haiti ===
| No. | Portrait | Commander of the Guard | Took office | Left office | Time in office | Defence branch |
|---|---|---|---|---|---|---|
| 1 | Démosthènes Pétrus Calixte | Colonel; Démosthènes Pétrus Calixte (c. 1899–?) | 1 August 1934 | 9 January 1938 | 3 years, 161 days | Haitian Army |
| 2 | Jules André | Colonel; Jules André | 9 January 1938 | 28 August 1944 | 6 years, 232 days | Haitian Army |
| 3 | Franck Lavaud | Colonel; Franck Lavaud (1903–1986) | 28 August 1944 | 5 September 1946 | 2 years, 8 days | Haitian Army |

=== Chiefs of the General Staff of the Army ===
| No. | Portrait | Chief of the General Staff | Took office | Left office | Time in office | Defence branch | Ref. |
|---|---|---|---|---|---|---|---|
| (3) | Franck Lavaud | Brigadier general Franck Lavaud (1903–1986) | 5 September 1946 | 6 December 1950 | 4 years, 92 days | Haitian Army | – |
| 4 | Antoine Levelt [fr] | Brigadier general Antoine Levelt (1910–?) | 6 December 1950 | 13 December 1956 | 6 years, 7 days | Haitian Army | – |
| 5 | Léon Cantave | Brigadier general Léon Cantave (1910–1967) | 13 December 1956 | 26 May 1957 | 164 days | Haitian Army | – |
| 6 | Antonio Thrasybule Kébreau | Brigadier general Antonio Thrasybule Kébreau (1909–1963) | 26 May 1957 | 12 March 1958 | 290 days | Haitian Army | |
| 7 | Maurice P. Flambert | Major general Maurice P. Flambert | 12 March 1958 | 7 December 1958 | 269 days | Haitian Army | |
| 8 | Pierre Merceron | Major general Pierre Merceron | 7 December 1958 | 6 September 1961 | 2 years, 273 days | Haitian Army | – |
| 9 | Jean-René Boucicault | Brigadier general Jean-René Boucicault | 7 September 1961 | 9 August 1962 | 336 days | Haitian Army | – |
| 10 | Gérard Constant | Brigadier general Gérard Constant | 9 August 1962 | 8 December 1970 | 8 years, 121 days | Haitian Army | – |
| 11 | Claude Raymond | Lieutenant general Claude Raymond | 8 December 1970 | 11 August 1973 | 2 years, 246 days | Haitian Army | |
| 12 | Jean-Baptiste Hilaire | Lieutenant general Jean-Baptiste Hilaire | 11 August 1973 | 6 September 1978 | 5 years, 26 days | Haitian Army | – |
| 13 | Roger Saint-Albin | Lieutenant general Roger Saint-Albin | 7 September 1978 | 23 March 1984 | 5 years, 198 days | Haitian Army | – |
| 14 | Henri Namphy | Lieutenant general Henri Namphy (1932–2018) | 23 March 1984 | 4 November 1987 | 3 years, 226 days | Haitian Army | – |

=== Commanders-in-chief of the Armed Forces of Haiti ===
| No. | Portrait | Commander-in-chief | Took office | Left office | Time in office | Defence branch | Ref. |
|---|---|---|---|---|---|---|---|
| (14) | Henri Namphy | Lieutenant general Henri Namphy (1932–2018) | 4 November 1987 | 17 June 1988 | 226 days | Haitian Army | |
| – | Morton Gousse | Brigadier general Morton Gousse; Acting (Note: Dismissed following the June 1988 coup d'état.) | 17 June 1988 | 19 June 1988 | 2 days | Haitian Army | |
| 15 | Carl-Michel Nicolas | Major general Carl-Michel Nicolas (Note: Dismissed following the September 1988 coup d'état.) | 19 June 1988 | 17 September 1988 | 90 days | Haitian Army | |
| 16 | Prosper Avril | Lieutenant general Prosper Avril (born 1937) | 17 September 1988 | 10 March 1990 | 1 year, 174 days | Haitian Army | |
| 17 | Hérard Abraham | Lieutenant general Hérard Abraham (1940–2022) | 10 March 1990 | 2 July 1991 | 1 year, 114 days | Haitian Army | – |
| 18 | Raoul Cédras | Lieutenant general Raoul Cédras (born 1949) (Note: Staged the 1991 coup d'état. Afterwards served as de facto leader of Haiti from 1991 to 1994.) | 2 July 1991 | 10 October 1994 | 3 years, 100 days | Haitian Army | |
| – | Jean-Claude Duperval | Major general Jean-Claude Duperval (1947–2020); Acting | 10 October 1994 | 17 November 1994 | 38 days | Haitian Army | |
| 19 | Bernardin Poisson | Brigadier general Bernardin Poisson (born 1948) | 17 November 1994 | 20 February 1995 | 95 days | Haitian Army | |
Armed Forces disbanded (20 February 1995 – 17 November 2017)
| – | Jodel Lessage | Lieutenant general Jodel Lessage (born 1954); Acting | 17 November 2017 | 21 August 2024 | 6 years, 278 days | Haitian Army | |
| – | Derby Guerrier | Lieutenant general Derby Guerrier (born 1949); Acting | 21 August 2024 | Incumbent | 2 years, 17 days | Haitian Army | |

== See also ==
- Military history of Haiti

== Bibliography ==
- Daniel Supplice, Bibliographic dictionary of political personalities of the Republic of Haiti 1804–2001. Lanno Imprimerie, Belgium 2001, ISBN 9993562300
