= Dover test =

US journalistic phrase

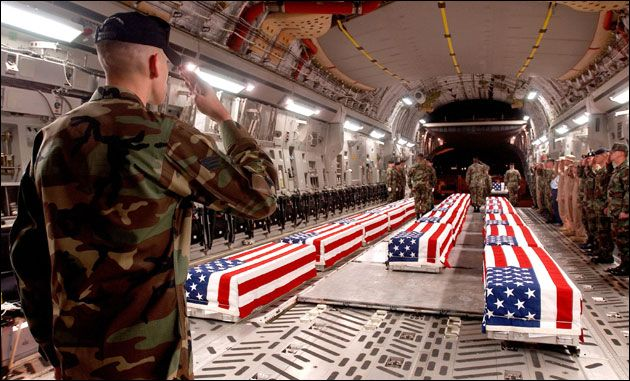
American war casualties returning to Dover AFB from Iraq in 2004. Photo by the U.S. Air Force.

The Dover test is an informal test and a journalistic phrase to describe whether the general population of the United States is supporting the participation of the United States in a war or other military action by the public reaction to returning war casualties. The test is usually used to support a partisan position concerning the United States government's actions rather than to actually determine the level of public support for the war.

== Description ==
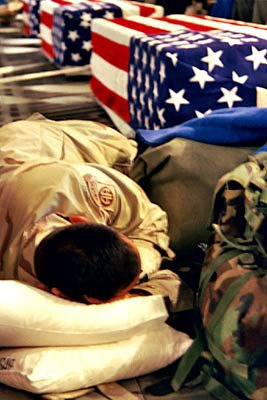
A U.S. Army soldier sleeps near transfer cases aboard an aircraft bound for Dover Air Force Base, Delaware from Afghanistan in 2003. He was accompanying his friend's remains.

The test's name refers to Dover Air Force Base in Dover, Delaware in the United States. The base is home to the Department of Defense's Charles C. Carson Center for Mortuary Affairs. 50,000 U.S. casualties have arrived at this airport since 1955. An early use of the term "Dover test" was uttered by Senator John Glenn (D-Ohio) in 1994. The Dover test was also explicitly mentioned by Gen. Hugh Shelton in 1999, and again on January 19, 2000, when he said:

...(M)ust be subjected to what I call the 'Dover test.' Is the American public prepared for the sight of our most precious resource coming home in flag-draped caskets into Dover Air Force Base in Delaware – which is a point entry for our Armed Forces?

The Dover test is not a formal test, and the consequences are difficult to measure. Some say that certain deduction from the tests can be attained, though. If the United States population continues to support the war after the news coverage, then the U.S. government has passed the Dover test, and continued warfare probably does not reduce the popularity of the government.

If the American population does not continue to support the war, then the government has failed the test, and continued warfare may reduce the popularity of the government. Differing factions may use reactions to the results to further their own motives. Subsequently, the test is used more often to support someone's opinion or to question government actions than to actually determine the level of public support for the war.

== History ==
=== Early examples ===
The return of American war casualties created difficulties for the U.S. government for the first time during the Vietnam War, where the public opinion changed against the war during the conflict. On December 21, 1989, during the invasion of Panama, President George Herbert Walker Bush prohibited media coverage of returning casualties, apparently angered by a split screen, showing him giving a news briefing on one half of the screen, and returning caskets on the other half.

In the first Iraq War, the government banned media outlets from showing any returning deceased at Dover.

=== Recent examples ===
Operation Restore Hope in Mogadishu, Somalia, could be said to have failed the Dover test after the Battle of Mogadishu on October 3, 1993, when the mutilated bodies of US soldiers were shown on the news. Public support quickly fell and U.S. forces were soon withdrawn. During November 2000, the Clinton administration established a rule prohibiting any press coverage of returning US war casualties. However, this rule was rarely enforced. During the U.S. invasion of Afghanistan in 2001, photos of returning war casualties were frequently shown on the news.

=== Iraq war and post-occupation ===
The Dover test was most recently mentioned by the press in regard to the invasion and occupation of Iraq. The Bush administration tried to avoid having to pass the Dover test by enforcing the rule from the end of the Clinton administration. Tami Silicio, a worker for a military contractor in Kuwait took photos of the coffins of returning casualties, which made their way to the front pages. Subsequently, she and her husband were terminated by the contractor. Shortly thereafter a journalist from The Memory Hole requested casualty photos under the Freedom of Information Act, and received a number of pictures. Some photographs at the site were later identified as the coffins of Space Shuttle Columbia crewmembers, not military casualties. The Bush administration was displeased, and prohibited the further release of photos to the media.
