= Morton Gousse =

Haitian military officer

General Morton Gousse
- Military career
- Allegiance: Haiti
- Branch: Armed Forces of Haiti
- Rank: Brigadier general
- Commands: Acting Commander-in-Chief of the Armed Forces of Haiti

Brigadier general Morton Gousse, a Haitian military officer, served as the Acting Commander-in-Chief of the Armed Forces of Haiti from 17 to 19 June 1988, under the presidency of Leslie Manigat. He was appointed by Manigat following the dismissal of Henri Namphy, and dismissed only two days later, after Namphy staged the June 1988 Haitian coup d'état.

Military offices
Preceded by Henri Namphy	Commander-in-Chief of the Armed Forces of Haiti; Acting; 1988	Succeeded by Carl-Michel Nicolas
