= Mario Andrésol =

Haitian politician (born 1960)

Minister of Defense
- Incumbent
- Assumed office 4 March 2026
- Prime Minister: Alix Didier Fils-Aimé (acting)
- Preceded by: Jean-Michel Moïse

Secretary of State for Public Security
- In office 14 January 2025 – 4 March 2026

Director-General of the Haitian National Police
- In office 24 July 2005 – 18 August 2012
- President: Boniface Alexandre (acting); René Préval; Michel Martelly
- Preceded by: Léon Charles
- Succeeded by: Godson Aurélus

Personal details
- Born: 20 July 1960 (age 66) Port-au-Prince, Haiti
- Police career
- Department: Haitian National Police
- Branch: Judicial Police
- Service years: 1995–2001; 2005–2012
- Rank: Director-General of the National Police
- Military career
- Branch: Haitian Army
- Service years: 1986–1995
- Rank: Captain

Mario Andrésol (born 20 July 1960) is a Haitian politician and former military and police officer who has served as the Minister of Defense since 2026. He previously served as the Secretary of State for Public Security from 2025 to 2026, the Director-General of the Haitian National Police from 2005 to 2012, and the Central Director of the Judicial Police from 1998 to 2001.

Born and raised in Port-au-Prince, Andrésol went on to graduate from the Military Academy of Haiti in 1984, the United States Army Infantry School in 1985, and the French National Gendarmerie Officer Training School in 1986. He then served in law enforcement units of the Haitian Army until 1995, reaching the rank of captain. After the Armed Forces of Haiti (FAd'H) were abolished, he served in the Interim Public Security Force before joining the newly formed Haitian National Police (PNH).

Andrésol was promoted through the ranks of the National Police during the first René Préval administration in the 1990s. As the head of the Judicial Police, became known for jailing Colombian drug traffickers, pursuing corrupt police officials, and investigating political murders that sometimes implicated the ruling party Fanmi Lavalas. He was removed by the second administration of Jean-Bertrand Aristide when Fanmi Lavalas expanded their control over the PNH. Andrésol was briefly arrested in 2001, and then lived in exile in the United States after being released. He returned to Haiti following Aristide's overthrow in 2004. As the Director-General of the National Police, Andrésol helped rebuild the force, increasing it from 3,500 officers in 2005 to 10,000 by the end of his tenure in 2012. He also increased arrests and organized anti-gang operations with the United Nations Stabilisation Mission in Haiti.

After retiring from the National Police, he ran as a candidate in the 2015 Haitian presidential election. Andrésol returned to government service in 2025 with his appointment as Secretary of State for Public Security amidst the 2020s Haitian gang conflict. In 2026 he was made the Minister of Defense, and in that role he has begun implementing a plan for the reconstruction of the FAd'H to combat the gangs.

== Early life and education ==
Mario Andrésol was born on 20 July 1960 in Port-au-Prince, Haiti. He received his primary education at the Brothers of the Sacred Heart John XXIII School and his secondary education at the Collège Saint-Pierre. Andrésol began studying in the department of human sciences at the State University of Haiti in 1980, but while he was student there, he decided to pursue a military career and applied for the Military Academy of Haiti in 1982. Andrésol was accepted and studied at the Military Academy until he graduated in 1984. He then began a one-year infantry officer course at the United States Army Infantry School at Fort Benning, Georgia. He completed his training in the United States in 1985, and then attended the National Gendarmerie Officer Training School in Melun, France, which he graduated in 1986.

== Military and police career ==
Andrésol returned to Haiti in 1986 and began his military service as a second lieutenant the 39th Company of the Haitian Army, part of the Motor Traffic Service. The military was also responsible for law enforcement in Haiti at the time, and his unique training in both infantry and gendarmerie officer roles benefited his career in the Armed Forces of Haiti (FAd'H). For the next three years, in addition to his military work, Andrésol also became a student at the National Institute of Management and Advanced International Studies (INAGHEI), where he studied international relations. In 1989, he was transferred to the 40th Company, which served as the Anti-Gang Unit in Port-au-Prince. Andrésol received his first experience in combating organized crime while serving in Port-au-Prince from 1989 to 1990. After his promotion to first lieutenant, Andrésol served as the executive officer of the 52nd Company from 1990 to 1994, which was responsible for security at Port-au-Prince Airport. He was promoted to captain in 1993.

After Operation Uphold Democracy in 1994 and the decision of the restored Jean-Bertrand Aristide administration to abolish the FAd'H, Andrésol served in the Interim Public Security Force and became an associate of its commander, Maj. Dany Toussaint. Between 1994 and 1995, he held the roles of military commander of the Jacmel District, the Sud-Est Department, the Arcahaie District, and the 52nd Company. After the creation of the civilian Haitian National Police (PNH), he was promoted in the new organization during the first René Préval administration, and was a protege of Secretary of State for Public Security Robert Manuel. Andrésol served as the Municipal Commissioner of Pétion-Ville from 1995 to 1997, the Chief Commissioner of the Port-au-Prince District from 1997 to 1998, and the Central Director of the Judicial Police from 1998 to 2001.

As the head of the Judicial Police, Andrésol was the force's chief investigator, and was responsible for jailing Colombian drug traffickers and going after corrupt Haitian police officials that collaborated with them. He also investigated political assassinations that sometimes implicated Fanmi Lavalas ruling party members. Andrésol worked with the US Embassy's Narcotics Affairs Section, and survived at least two assassination attempts. The Los Angeles Times described him in 2001 as "probably the closest thing the Haitian National Police ever had to a super-cop." Andrésol was removed from his post shortly after the start of the second Aristide administration, which appointed a new police director-general in March 2001, who replaced Andrésol as one of his first acts. His dismissal was part of a larger effort by Fanmi Lavalas to remove PNH officials that were perceived as more aligned with the US than with Aristide, and to expand their control over the National Police.

Andrésol was arrested on 31 July 2001 after being accused of organizing the 28 July 2001 attack on the National Police Academy and several police stations by gunmen, which the government described as a coup attempt. He denied the charges, and was released on 27 August 2001 after a judge ruled that his arrest was "illegal and arbitrary." The United States also pressured the Haitian government to release him. While living in exile in the United States from 2001 to 2005, Andrésol was a student of paralegal studies at the New York Paralegal School in New York City.

=== Police director-general ===
Andrésol was appointed as the Director-General of the Haitian National Police on 24 July 2005, succeeding Léon Charles. He was made the head of the police by the transitional government of President Boniface Alexandre and Prime Minister Gérard Latortue, which replaced Aristide after the 2004 coup. Andrésol took over a force that had been discredited due to its politicization by Aristide. He also stated that 25% of the force was corrupt and that it needed reform. During his tenure, he worked to reform the PNH and to organize operations against gangs in the slums of Port-au-Prince, along with the United Nations Stabilisation Mission in Haiti. Arrest rates increased significantly. Andrésol also cooperated with the US, which provided logistical support for the PNH. After the 2006 Haitian general election, he worked with the second administration of René Préval, which reappointed him for another term as director-general. In August 2006, Andrésol, Préval's advisor Robert Manuel, and Secretary of State for Public Security Joseph Luc-Eucher developed a police reform plan that included raising the force to 14,000 officers, among other changes.

By late 2008, significant progress had been made in restoring public confidence in the National Police, expanding its presence, and increasing the number of officers. The 12 January 2010 Haiti earthquake caused significant damage to the PNH, including the loss of its headquarters. As of twenty months after the earthquake, Andrésol's office was in a container donated by Germany. After the 2010–11 Haitian general election, he worked with the administration of President Michel Martelly, but their relations worsened as Martelly tried to increase his control over the PNH. Despite the earthquake, the PNH reached a strength of 10,000 officers by the end of Andrésol's tenure in 2012, increasing from 3,500 in 2005. The International Peace Institute considered the National Police to be one of the best functioning government institutions of Haiti in 2012. Andrésol served three terms as director-general, the last of which expired in that year. He was succeeded on 18 August 2012 by Godson Aurélus. His tenure as director-general is widely regarded as having been successful, and the Haitian newspaper Le Nouvelliste described him as serving "with measured judgment in an institution that has been key to building democracy in Haiti. He handled the transitions between three different presidents with great tact."

== Later work and political career ==
In December 2013, Andrésol inaugurated his own clothing line. He ran as a candidate in the 2015 Haitian presidential election. On 29 June 2017, he spoke at a panel that called for national unity among Haitians for a "total war" against insecurity in Haiti. Andrésol called for the problem to be addressed with an "intersectoral security strategy" that involves both increasing the capabilities of the police and judiciary as well as combating structural causes, such as poverty, poor governance, and environmental degradation. He also advised that a National Security Council be created to coordinate security agencies and that a new penal code be adopted by the judicial system.

On 14 January 2025, Andrésol returned to government service for the first time since retiring from the PNH when Prime Minister Alix Didier Fils-Aimé appointed him as the Secretary of State for Public Security, amidst the 2020s Haitian conflict with gangs. In January 2026, he became the first government official to make a statement acknowledging that the Erik Prince's company Vectus Global was operating alongside the PNH to restore control in and around Port-au-Prince.

=== Defense minister ===
On 4 March 2026, Andrésol was appointed as the Minister of Defense by Fils-Aimé. His goals as defense minister include training 15,000 soldiers over the next five years. In an interview on 30 May 2026, he stated that the dissolution of the armed forces in 1995 created a security vacuum. He explained his plan for the reconstruction of the FAd'H into a force under civilian control and respectful of human rights, that can be used to expand the government's territorial control, while the PNH maintains order. Andrésol also stated that the government seeks to create a professional army with the launching of a national recruitment campaign and the rehabilitation of military facilities.

On 13 July 2026, the Ministry of Defense published a report on activities during Andrésol's first 100 days, which included a recruitment campaign that received 17,722 applications, rehabilitation work at the Vertiéres, Anacaona, and Clercine bases to increase their capacity, and developing military partnerships with several countries to help strengthen the FAd'H.
