= Derby Guerrier =

Current Commander in Chief of the Armed Forces of Haiti

Acting Commander-in-Chief of the Armed Forces of Haiti
- Incumbent
- Assumed office 20 August 2024
- Deputy: Maj. Gen. Jonas Jean
- Preceded by: Lt. Gen. Jodel Lessage

Assistant Chief of Staff (G2/G4) of the Armed Forces of Haiti
- In office 27 March 2017 – 20 August 2024

Personal details
- Born: 14 October 1949 (age 76) Haiti

Military service
- Allegiance: Haiti
- Branch/service: Haitian Army
- Years of service: 1976–1995; 2017–current
- Rank: Lieutenant general

Derby Guerrier (born 14 October 1949) is a Haitian military officer, who is currently the acting Commander-in-Chief of the Armed Forces of Haiti. In 2017, he was among those selected by President Jovenel Moïse to be part of the remobilized armed forces' equivalent of the Joint Chiefs of Staff as Colonel, where he was the assistant Chief of the Staff (G2/G4). Shortly after being promoted to Brigadier general on July 27, 2024, he would be selected by the Transitional Presidential Council and the Council of Ministers led by Prime minister Garry Conille on August 7, to succeed to Lt. Gen. Jodel Lessage as commander in chief. The TPC claimed that the change in leadership was part of efforts to fight insecurity and for the FAD'H to take a more active role in the fight against terrorism and gangs. On the 20th of August 2024, he would be promoted to Lieutenant general and officially installed at his functions in ceremony at the National Palace. He is the second Commander-in-Chief following the re-establishment of the Armed Forces after 22 years and their disbandment in 1995, during the Operation Uphold Democracy.

Military offices
Preceded by Jodel Lessage; Acting	Commander-in-Chief of the Armed Forces of Haiti; Acting; 2024–present	Incumbent
