= Carl-Michel Nicolas =

Haitian military officer

General Carl-Michel Nicolas
- Military career
- Allegiance: Haiti
- Branch: Armed Forces of Haiti
- Rank: Major general
- Commands: Commander-in-Chief of the Armed Forces of Haiti

Major general Carl-Michel Nicolas, a Haitian military officer, served as the Commander-in-Chief of the Armed Forces of Haiti from 19 June 1988 to 17 September 1988, under the military dictatorship of Henri Namphy. He was appointed by Namphy following the June 1988 Haitian coup d'état, and dismissed by Prosper Avril following the September 1988 Haitian coup d'état.

Military offices
Preceded by Morton Gousse; Acting	Commander-in-Chief of the Armed Forces of Haiti; 1988	Succeeded by Prosper Avril
