= Haitian Army =

Branch of the Armed Forces of Haiti

- Armée d'Haïti (French); Lame d'Ayiti (Haitian Creole)
- Active: 1802–1994; 2017–present
- Country: Haiti
- Type: Army
- Role: Land warfare
- Part of: Armed Forces of Haiti
- HQ: Grand Quartier Général, Champ de Mars, Port-au-Prince
- Mottos: Du Sol Soyons Seuls Maîtres 'Of the Land, Lone Masters'
- Anniversaries: 13 October
- Engagements: American Revolutionary War; Siege of Savannah (as Chasseurs Volontaires de Saint-Domingue); Haitian Revolution; Colombian War of Independence; Dominican War of Independence; Banana Wars; United States occupation of Haiti; Korean War; Gang war in Haiti

Commanders
- Nominal Head: Alix Didier Fils-Aimé (acting)
- Minister of Defense: Mario Andrésol
- Commander-in-Chief of the Armed Forces: Lt.Gen. Derby Guerrier (acting)
- Chief of the General Staff: Brig.Gen. Emmanuel Azémar

Originating from the Army of Saint-Domingue (1791–1803), then the Indigenous Army (1803–1915), the Haitian Army (French: Armée d'Haiti; Haitian Creole: Lame d'Ayiti) is the land component of the Armed Forces of Haiti. It is the largest branch of the armed forces since its reinstatement in 2017 by then President Jovenel Moïse.

== History ==
=== Korean War ===
During the Korean War, the Haitian Army sent a small contigent of combat troops, likely embedded with U.S. troops as part of the United Nations Police action against the communist forces of North Korea and China. As a result, Haitian Colonel Roger Villedrouin was the recipient of the Legion of Merit.

== Former organization ==
=== Small Arms/Artillery/Armored vehicles ===
The equipment of the last standing army, most of it from the United States, was taken by the US Army in the 1990s during Operation Uphold Democracy or sold shortly after:

- Cadillac-Gage V-100 Light Armoured Vehicle
- M1916 75 mm towed guns
- M101 105 mm towed howitzers
- M16 assault rifle
- Heckler & Koch G3 battle rifle
- FN FAL battle rifle
- T65 assault rifle
- Beretta M1951 pistol
- Uzi sub-machine gun

== Organization ==
=== Bases ===
Bases of the Haitian Army
- Headquarters of the Armed Forces of Haiti (Grand Quartier des Forces Armées d'Haiti), Champ de Mars, Port-au-Prince
- "Anacaona" Military Base, Léogâne.
  - Previously housing the South Korean Army contingent of the MINUSTAH
  - Serves as the recruitment and formation center of the Armed Forces.
- Clercine Military Base, Port-au-Prince
  - attached to Toussaint Louverture International Airport
- Corps of Engineers Complex, La Saline Boulevard, Port-au-Prince.
  - Ministry of Defense Annex
- "Vertières" Base, Tabarre, Port-au-Prince
  - largest base of the FAD'H (2.5+ acres), will also be used as basic training camp to train approximately 2,500 recruits over the next year.
  - formerly "General Bacellar" Base of the Brazilian Army infantry battalion. It also housed the Paraguayan Army Corps of Engineers battalion, and Argentine Air Force Mobile Field Hospital.
- Malpasse Military Outpost
  - near the Malpasse-Jimani land border crossing
- Marion Hydroelectric Plant Detachment, south of Fort-Liberté
- Péligre Caserne, Péligre Dam, Center Department

Army Branch	Insigna	Logo/Combat Patch	Role
Corps of Engineers (Corps du Génie Militaire)			Military engineering
Infantry (Infanterie)			Infantry
Special Forces (Forces Spéciales)		Combat Patch of the Special Forces of the Haitian Army	Special operations
Health Services (Service de Santé)	Doctors		Operational medicine Health care
Agricultural Section (Séction Agricole)			Agronomy
Marching Band (Fanfare de Forces Armées d'Haiti)			Marching band

== Personnel ==
=== Officers ===
Rank group	General / flag officers			Senior officers			Junior officers
Haitian Army
Haitian Army	Lieutenant général	Major général	Général de brigade	Colonel	Lieutenant-colonel	Major	Capitaine	Lieutenant	Sous-lieutenant
Haitian Army	Lyetnan jeneral	Majò jeneral	Jeneral brigad	Kolonèl	Lyetnan kolonèl	Majò	Kapitèn	Lyetnan	Soulyetnan

=== NCOs and Enlisted ===
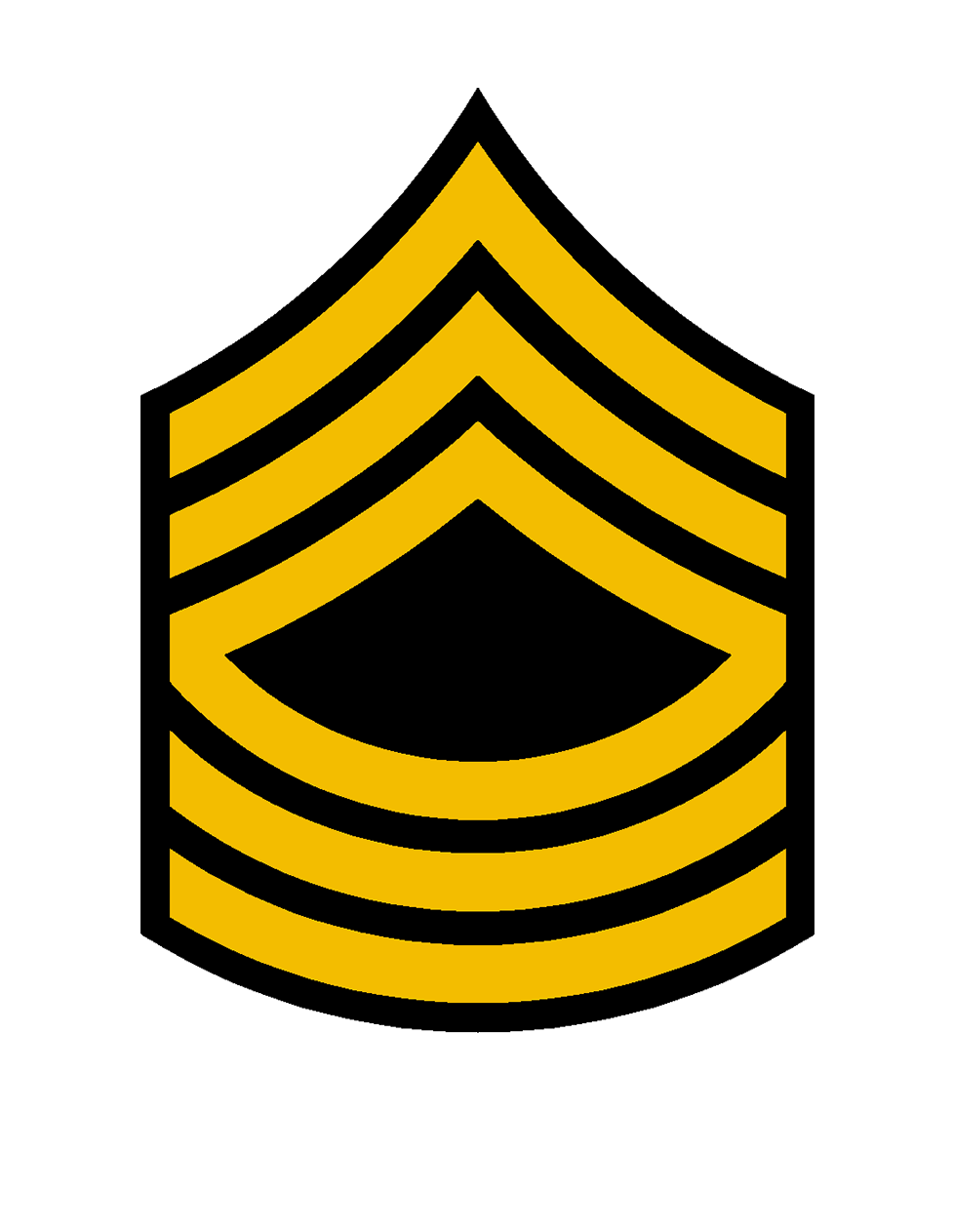
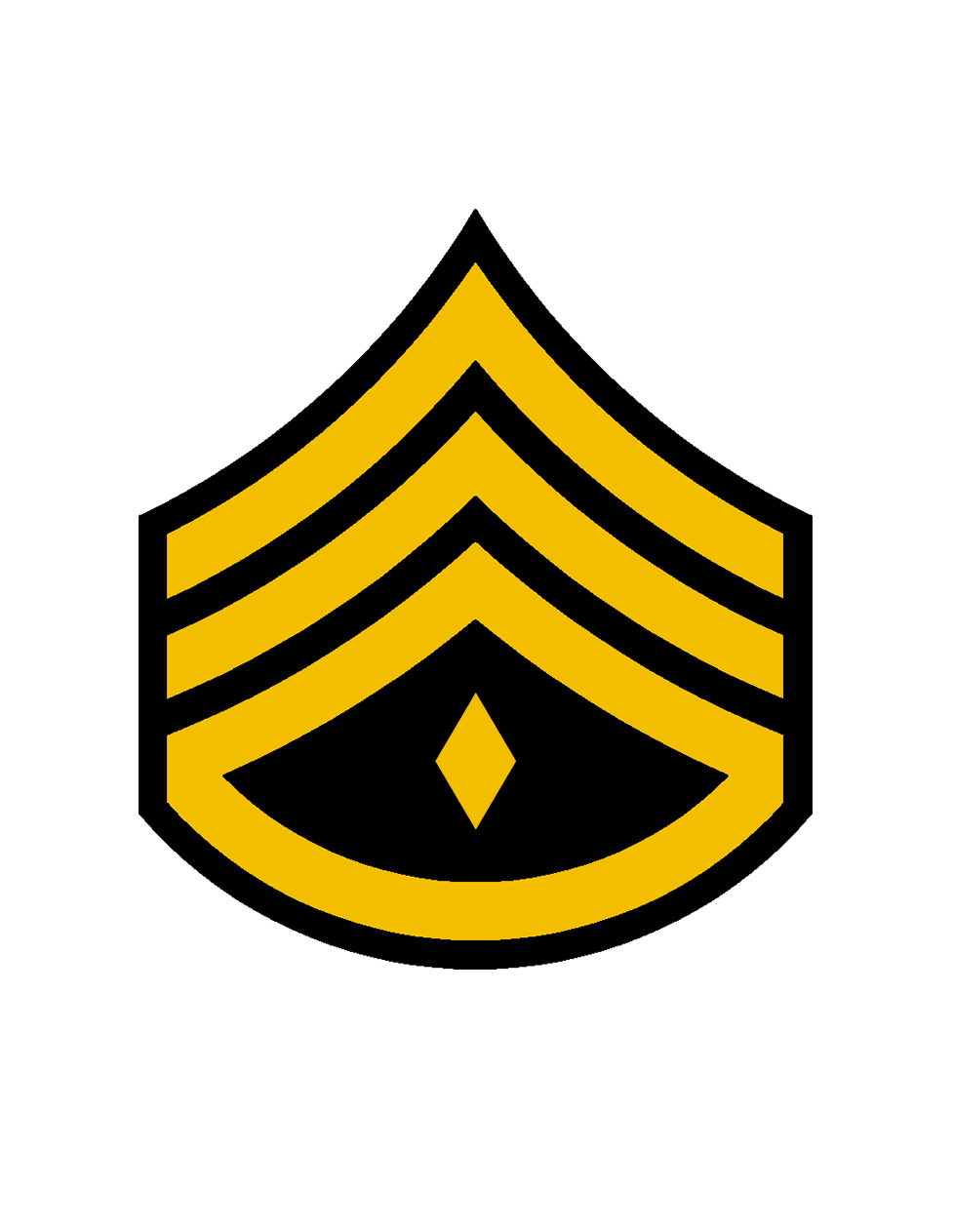
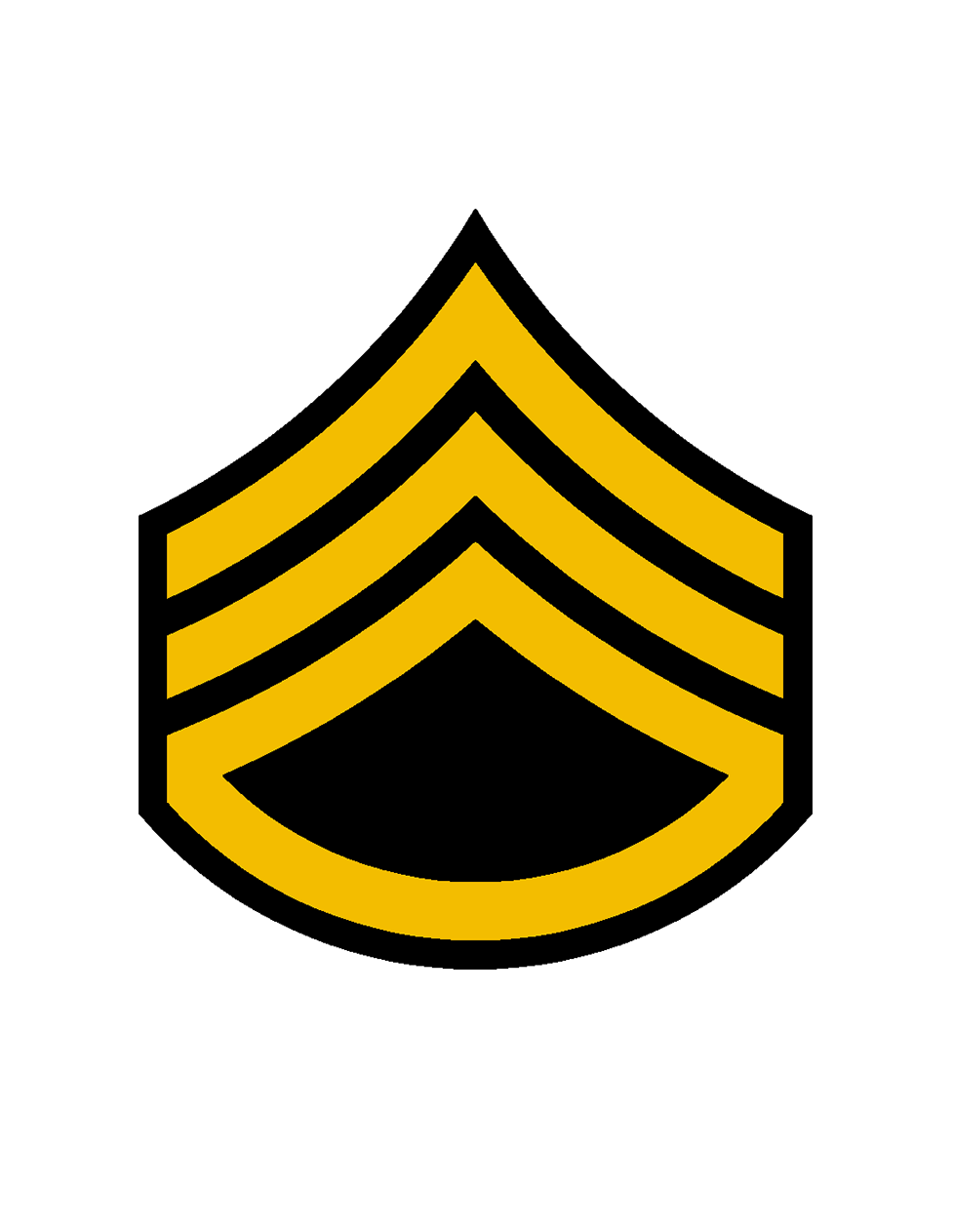
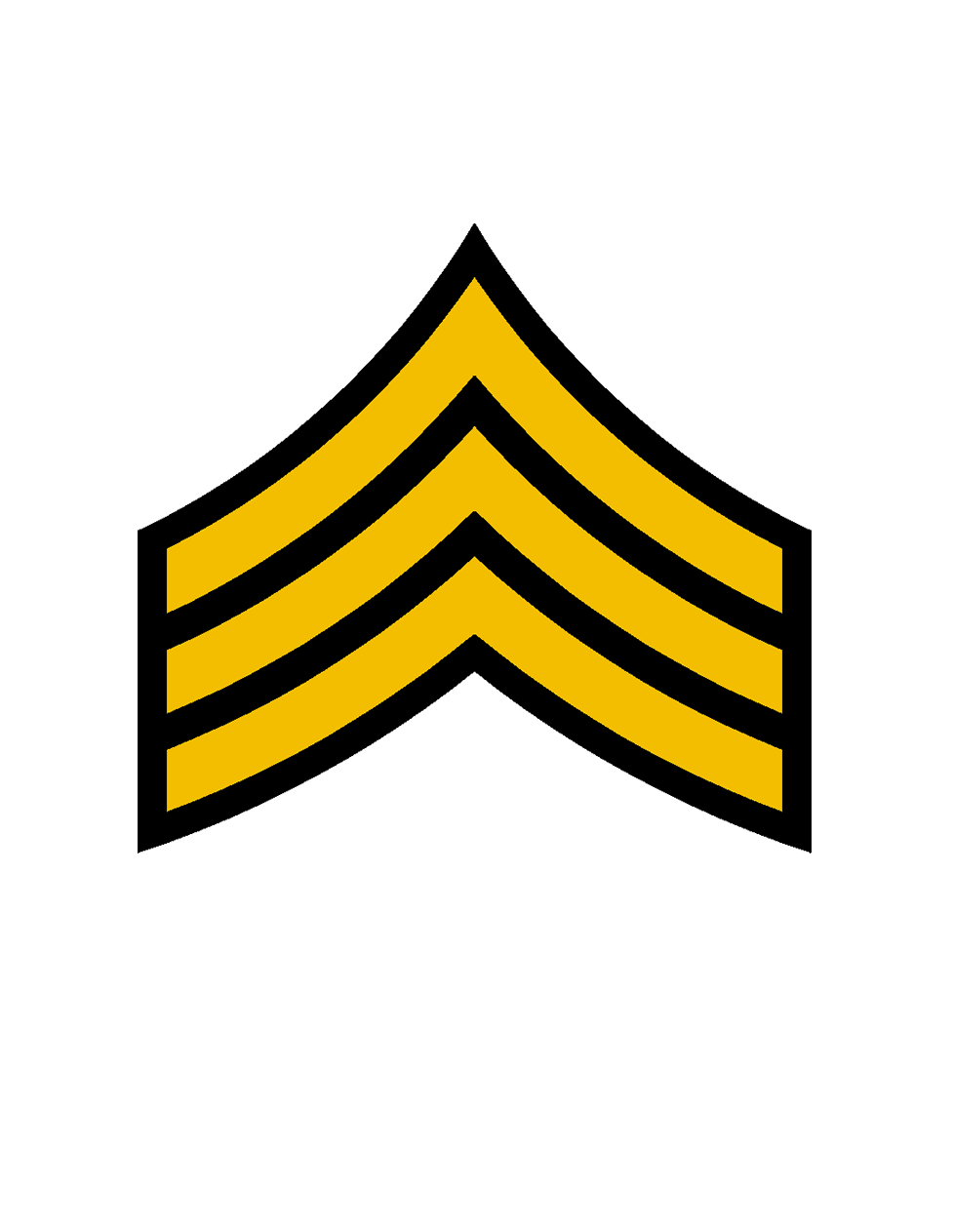
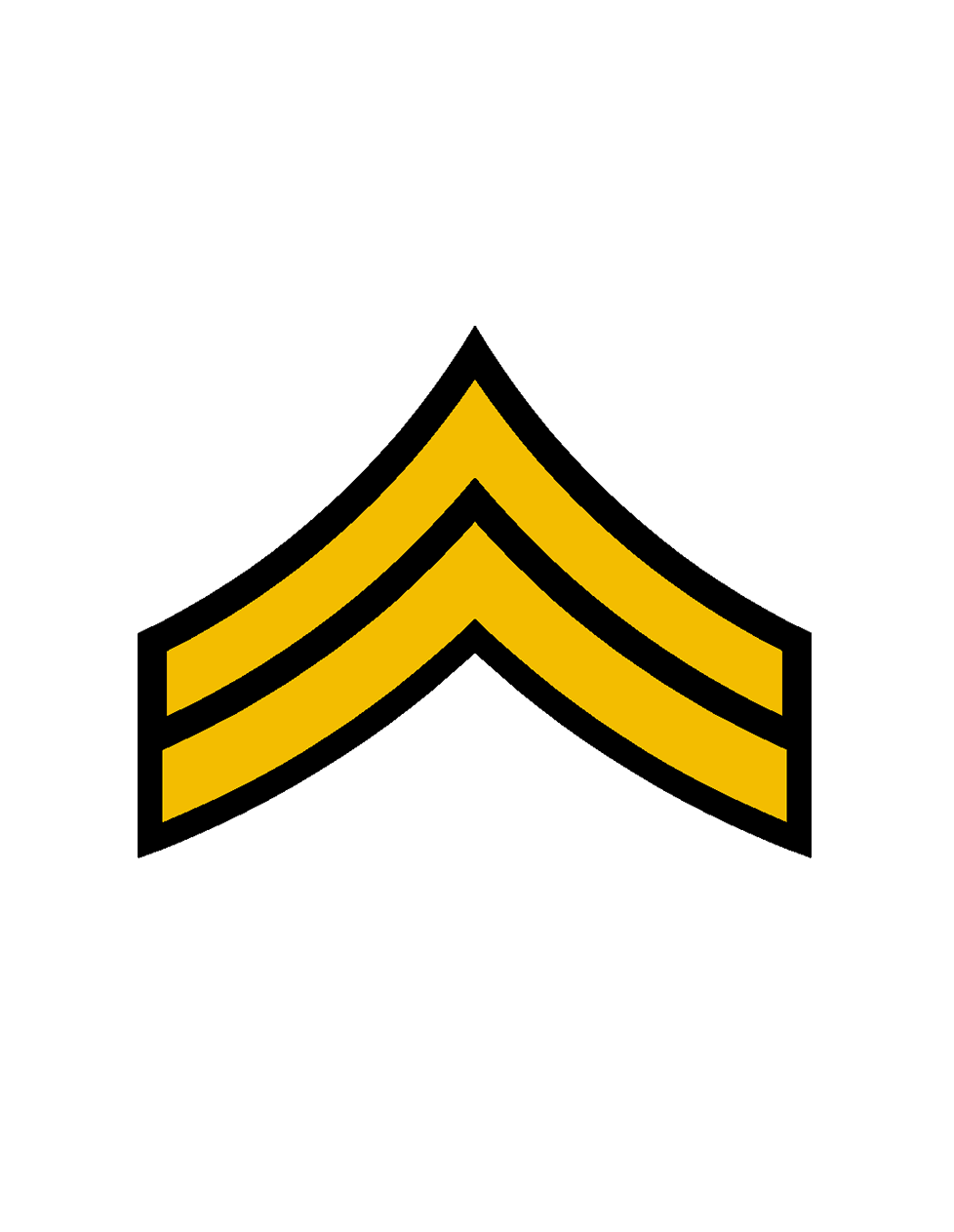
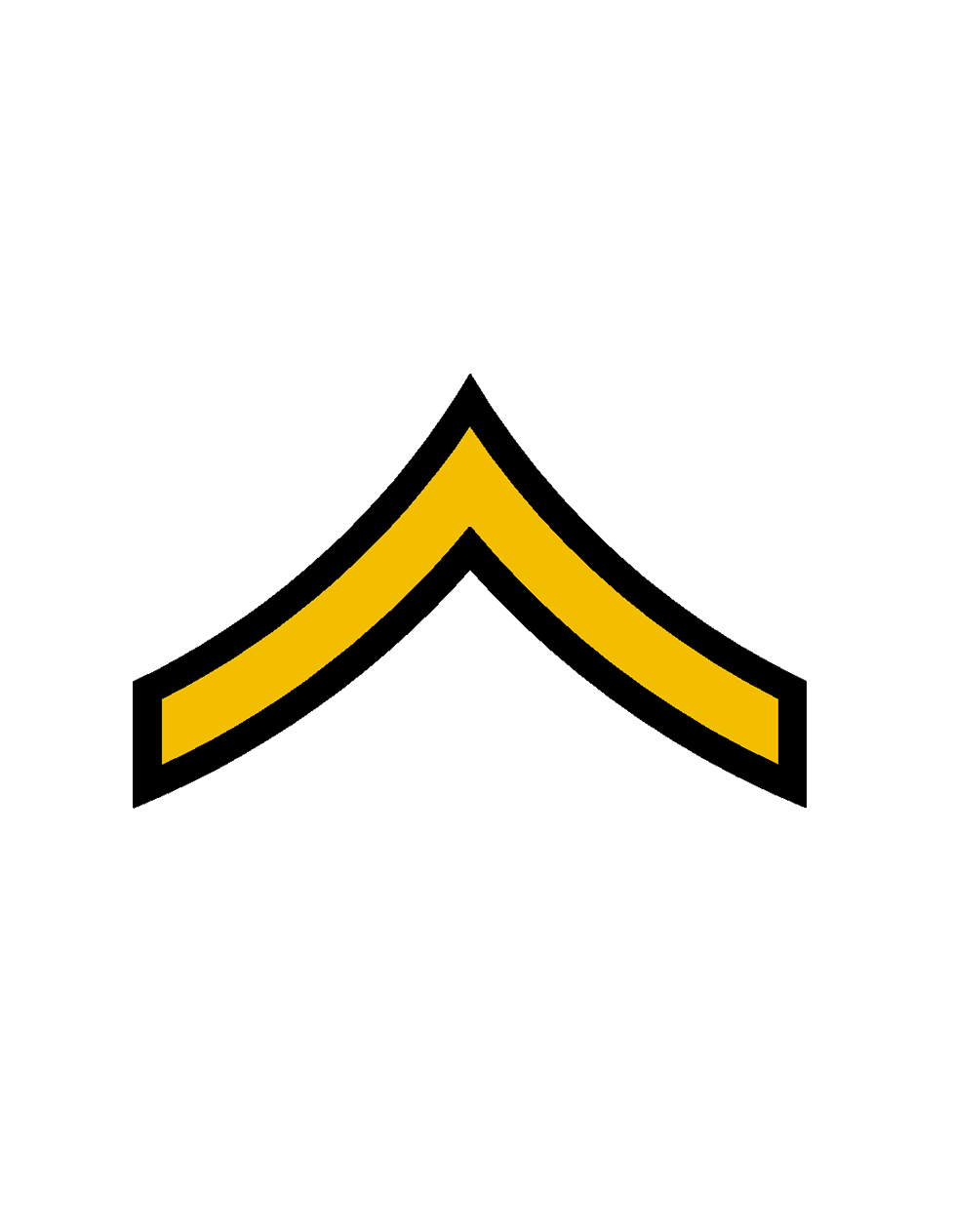
Rank group	Senior NCOs					Junior NCOs	Enlisted
Haitian Army								No insignia
Haitian Army	Adjutant	Sergent major	Premier sergent	Sergent-fourrier	Sergent	Caporal	Soldat de première classe	Soldat
Haitian Army	Adjitan	Sèjan majò	Premye sèjan	Sèjan-fourye	Sèjan	Kaporal	Sòlda premye klas	Sòlda

=== Reformation ===
The initial troops were formed in Ecuador between 2012 and 2017, during the Michel Martelly administration, as part of a cooperation accord between the two countries dating back to 2010, and revised in 2015. The soldiers of the Corps of Engineers (Corps du Génie, CORGE), were formed at the "Escuela Superior Militar Eloy Alfaro" in Quito, including 4 commissioned officers. Additionally, in 2015, 40 Commissioned Officers were formed at the "Escuela de Formación de Soldados" in Ambato and 27 enlisted would obtain an 8 months formation at the "Escuela de Formación Militar de Santo Domingo de Los Colorados" in Santo Domingo, Ecuador.

As part of the bilateral cooperation accord between Mexico and Haiti, signed on October 7th 2018, 50 Non-commissioned officer of the Armed Forces of Haiti get a formation at the "Escuela Militar de Sargentos" of the Mexican Army, in Puebla, Mexico. On August 16, 2019, the first class of servicemembers formed in Haiti, composed of 248 soldiers, 50 NCOs, and 15 officers, would graduate from the recruiting depot at the Anacaona Military Training Center, in Léogâne. That class was trained by Mexican military instructors.

In 2022, 29 NCOs would get trained at the "Centro de Adiestramiento de Fuerzas Especiales" in Temamatla, Mexico to become drill instructors in order to facilitate the formation of new soldiers on Haitian soil. Another company of 150 soldiers would go to Mexico to get a formation by the Mexican Army and Mexican National Guard, in subjects including drone warfare, guerilla warfare, Sniper training, Demolition. That company upon their return to Haiti would become the National Guard Unit (Unité de Garde Nationale) that was trained. In December of that year, the second class of soldiers formed in Haiti, composed of 409 soldiers (92 being women), swore allegiance as member of the Armed Forces on the grounds of the Military Aviation Base, in the presence of then Prime Minister Ariel Henry. The class was baptized "Dutty Bookman" after one of the originators of the Haitian Revolution. In 2023, 113 soldiers from the National Guard Unit travelled to Mexico for special operations training, becoming the first Special forces unit of the new FAd'H. On August 1, 2024, a recruitment campaign for enlisted troops was launched by the Ministry of Defense as part of the transitional government's objective to tackle insecurity plaguing the country; a goal to recruit at least 1500 troops was set.

On August 29, 2024, 20 officers and NCOs graduated from a training course on Human Rights, International Humanitarian Rights, as well Gender Equity. The training manual in human rights of the National Guard Unit was also revealed. The program was initiated by former PM Ariel Henry, orchestrated by the Ministry of Defense in collaboration with the United Nations Integrated Office in Haiti (BINUH). This manual is intended to train current and future soldier on topics including rules of engagement, protection of human rights in conflict and combat zones, Geneva Conventions provisions, and judicialization of the field of military operations. Lt. Gen. Guerrier stated that this manual will be the basis on which military law enforcement will be based. In his speech, Minister Berthier Antoine emphasized that the Haitian military must operate to the level and norms similar to those of the neighboring nations, while protecting human rights and promoting democratic values.

On September 18, 2024, Defense Minister Berthier Antoine, French Ambassador Antoine Michon, and Lt. Col. Laoufi of the French Forces in the Antilles would announce that 50 or so members of the FAd'H would be traveling to Martinique for continuing formation with the French Armed Forces to the Antilles. The first contingent of 25 soldier flew to Le Lamentin on November 3, 2024, where they trained with the 33rd Marine Infantry Regiment of the French Army for 2 weeks, from the 4th to the 16th. The training covered urban warfare, combat rescue & first aid, weapon handling, familiarization with the FAMAS, vehicle search, combat in open area, individual combat, and other techniques.

== Training ==
=== Basic Training ===
As of April 2026, the Haitian Army has two basic training camp: one at the "Vertières" military base (Tabarre) and the other at the "Anacaona" military base (Léogâne). The former was the first after the remobilization, but was cut off from the capital and the General Headquarters, due to gangs controlling the south entrance of Port-au-Prince. While Vertières is expected to host a maximum recruit count of 700, Anacoana will peak at 400 pending repairs and expansion work.

Training is scheduled to be completed in 4 months cycles according to the new plan proposed by Minister Mario Andresol.

=== Advanced Training ===
Army troops receive continuing training with the Mexican Army in Mexico, and with the French Army in Martinique, both as part as military cooperation accords.

Military trainers from Brazil are expected to travel to Haiti to train Haitian troops, confirmed by Brazilian Ambassador Luis Guilherme Nascentes da Silva.

== Equipment ==
Although the army's arsenal is not yet standardized, the main service rifle of the Haitian Army is the Brazilian Taurus T4, with the Taiwanese T91 assault rifle coming second. The main sidearm is the Brazilian Taurus TH9 pistol. The rest of its armory is typically borrowed from the larger police armory.

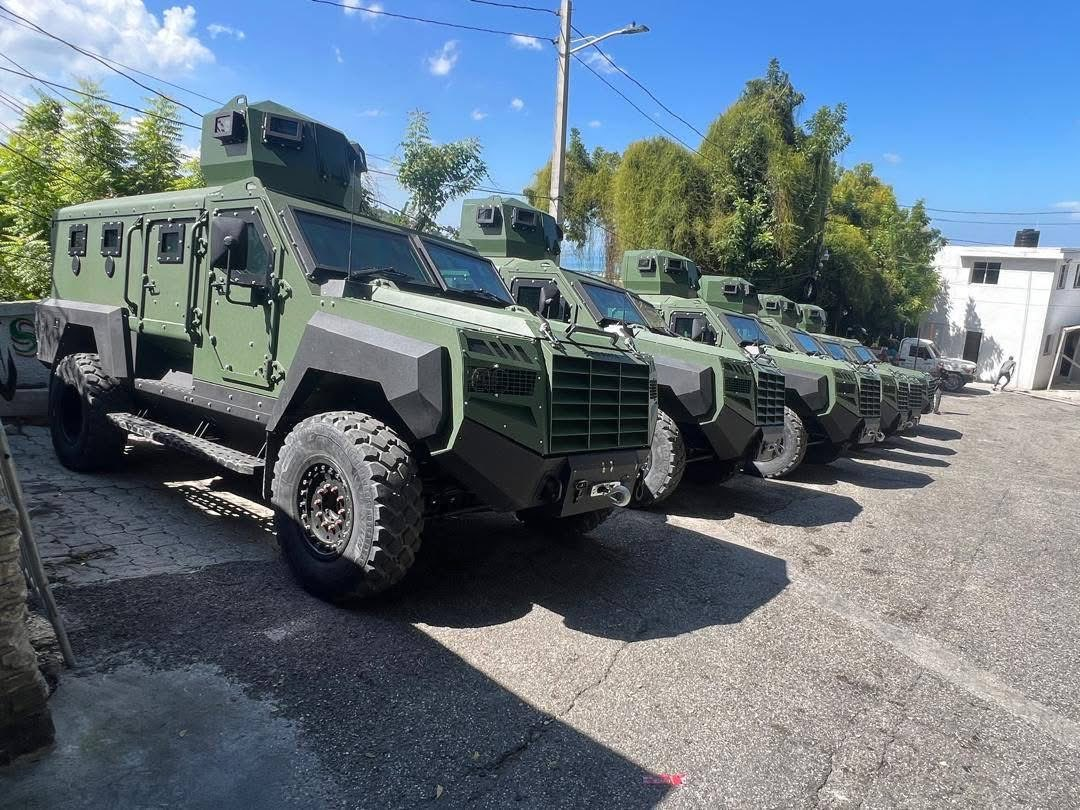
Roshel Senator RAM MRAP armored personnel carriers recently acquired for the Haitian Armed Forces.

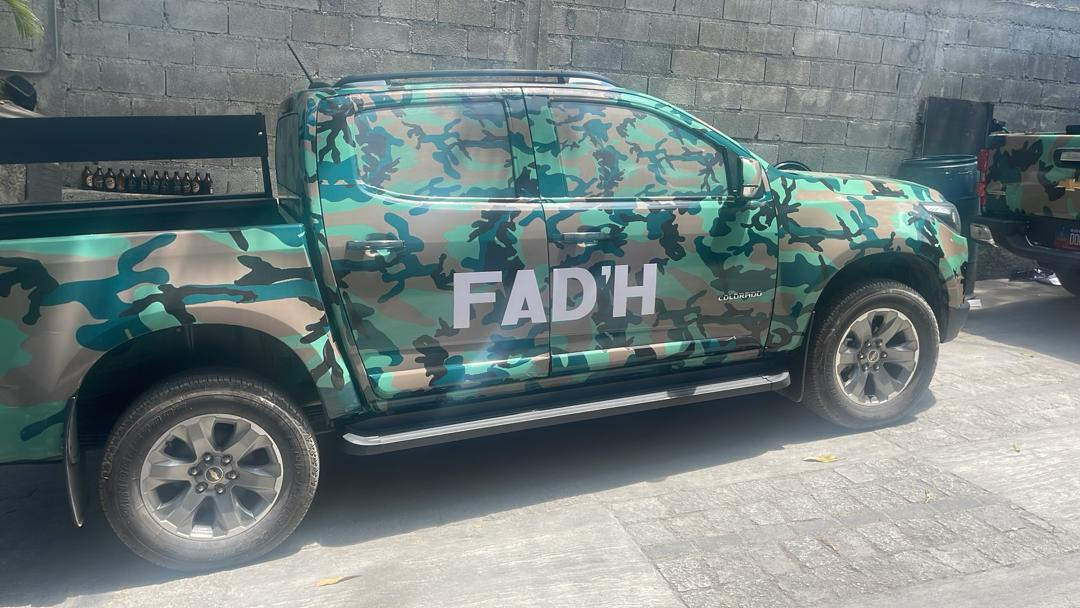
Pickup of the Haitian Armed Forces (FAd'H)

The acquisition of 25 pickup trucks and 2 troop transport trucks were made earlier in 2025.

On October 15, 2025, Defense minister Jean-Michel Moïse announced that a fleet of 17 armored vehicles, including Armoured personnel carriers and Armoured fighting vehicles were on the way to strengthen the Haitian Army. On November 8, seven (7) Roshel Senator RAM MRAP APCs would be handed over to the Army by the government and the ministry of defense.

== Uniform ==
=== Combat Utility Uniform ===
The uniform used by servicemen at work on the field varies, having been introduced at different times.

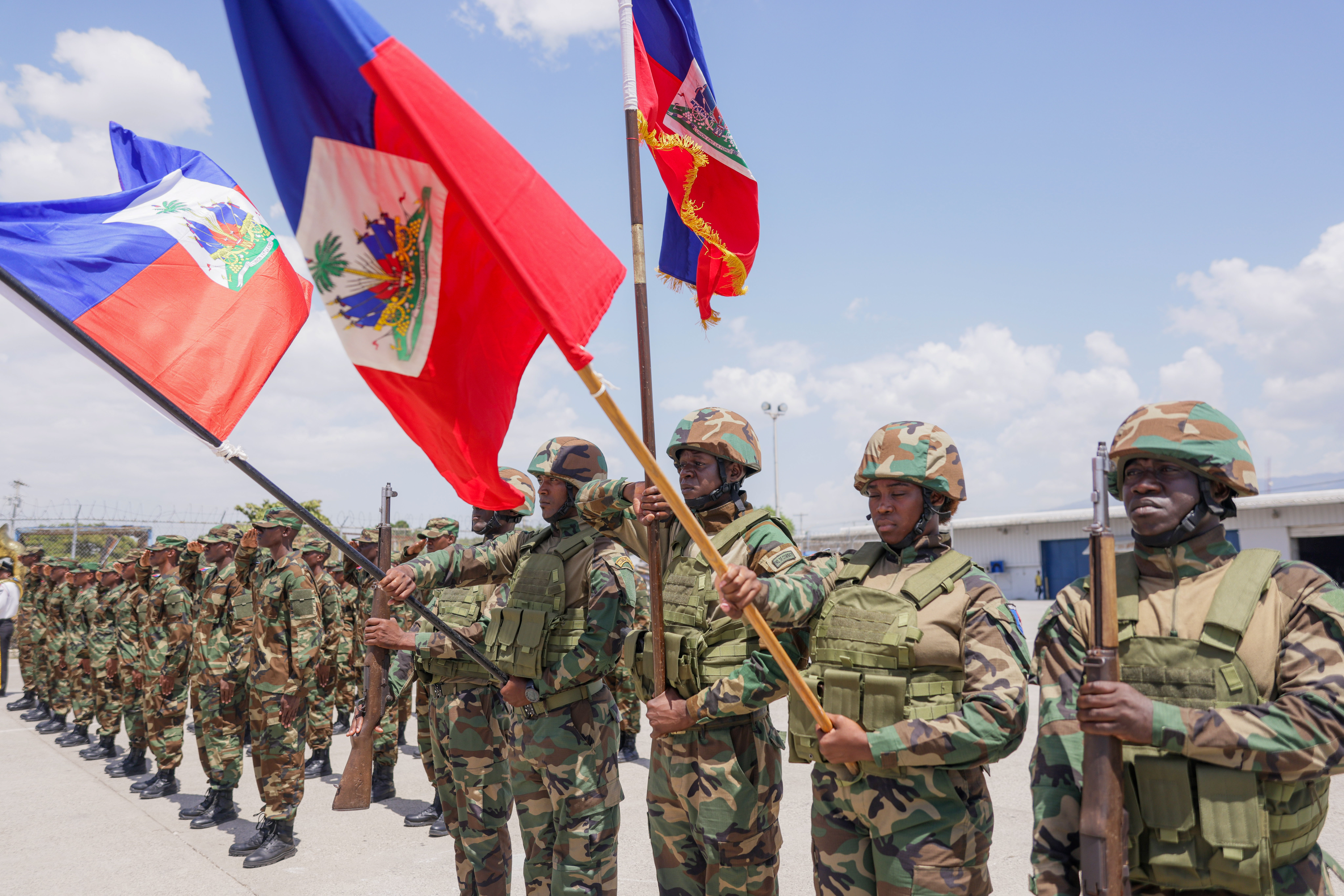
Haitian Army Troops in M81 Woodland style fatigues

The first elements of the armed wore a variant of woodland MARPAT. Later, recruits would be issued a solid olive green color uniform during basic training, which work carry over into service. On January 1, 2024, during the Independence Day ceremony, U.S. Woodland pattern uniforms would put on display by troops, worn with green ballistic helmets, OD green plate carriers and combat boots, as part of an acquisition of equipment by the Haitian government. This pattern has since become standard issue for combat uniforms for both the Army and the Aviation Corps. It is said that the change was to differentiate from units of the Presidential Palace Guard Unit (USGPN), which also uses a woodland MARPAT variant. The M81 variant is now the predominant pattern used by the Armed Forces.

=== Service Uniform ===
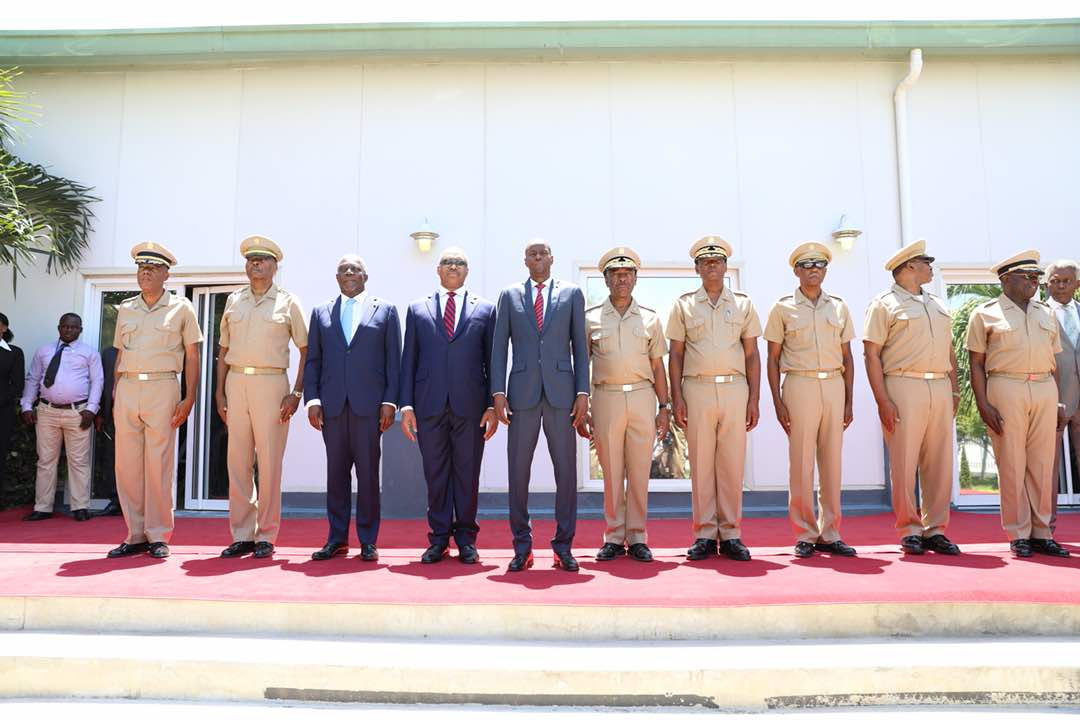
Service Uniform of the Haitian Army.

The traditional khaki shirt and pants (skirt optional for women) returned to service, as seen commonly worn by the Chiefs of Staff, with black shoes (or combat boots), and a khaki garrison cap. A cap frame with a black visor, khaki cap cover, is also part of the uniform, where officers have a gold strap, and enlisted have a black strap.

=== Service Dress Uniform ===
For ceremonies and parades, enlisted member wear long-sleeved khaki shirts with khaki ties. Officers wear a khaki jacket, with a red blue and red chord on the left shoulder, a white shirt and a black tie.

=== Dress Blues ===
There are 2 types of Dress Blues seen worn by the Armed Forces.

The first is the traditional dark blue cover, dark blue jacket with gold cuffs, light blue pants with gold side lining, gold belt, gold chord, and gold epaulettes.

The other is worn by the enlisted members of the Corps of Engineers who were trained in Ecuador. It is made up of a dark blue cover with red trims; dark blue jacket; blue and red chords; white shirt and black tie; white pants with a red side lining; and black shoes.

=== Dress Whites ===
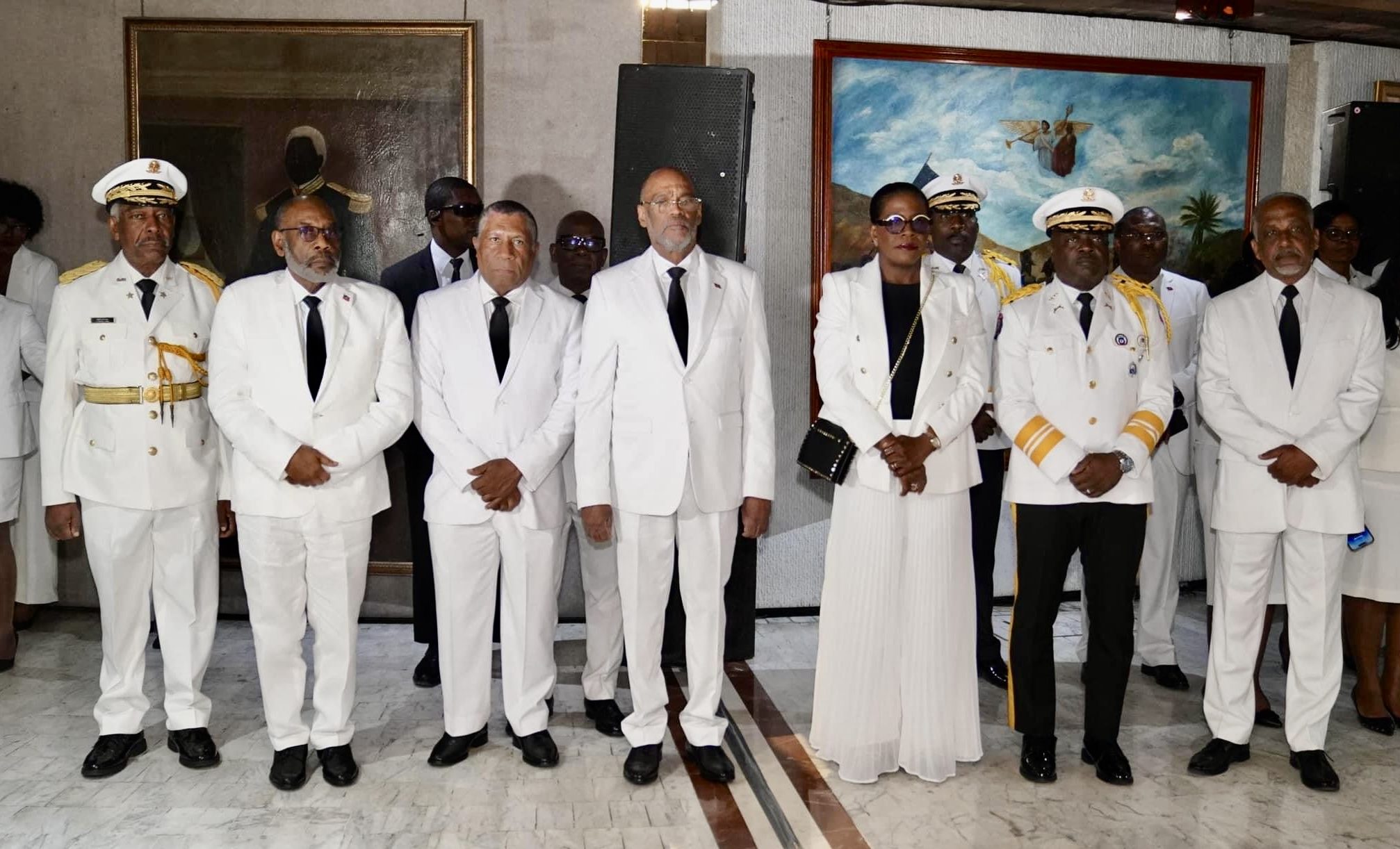
Lt.Gen. Lessage (L) in his Dress White Uniform

Seen only worn by High ranking Officers, during celebrations of national holidays such as Flag Day or Battle of Vertières day. The dress whites are composed of a white cover, jacket and shirt; black tie and shoes; and gold belts, chords, and epaulettes.

== See also ==
- Armed Forces of Haiti
- Haitian Aviation Corps
- Haitian Navy
- Military history of Haiti
- Haitian National Police
