= Jean Julme =

Haitian politician

Jean Julme was a former Minister of Defense and the Interior of the Republic of Haiti from 1964 to 1967 under the regime of Francois "Papa Doc" Duvalier. He was also a President of the National Assembly of Haiti from 1962 to 1964.

== Early political career ==
Julme first aligned himself with Duvalier during his own election in the Haitian region of Ganthier, which included the city of Croix-des-Bouquets. Julme was a large landowner in the area. A story about Julme attempting to deliver the Duvalier-Julme ballots to election stations but having his tires slashed is recounted in the book Haiti: The Duvaliers and their Legacy. He later vocally defended Duvalier's changes to the Haitian constitution to make himself President-for-Life, representing Haiti at the OAS.

== Later political career ==
In 1967, after bombs went off near the Presidential Palace, Julme was swept up in a purge and imprisoned along with other former members of Papa Doc's cabinet at Fort Dimanche. When he was released, Julme was re-offered his position but refused. Duvalier continued to send Julme letters in an attempt to seduce him to work with him again, saying things such as "To my old comrade Jean M. Julme, in remembrance of the battles which ended in 22 September 1957." Julme was eventually released but did not rejoin the regime.

When Duvalier died and power was transferred to his son, Jean-Claude "Baby Doc" Duvalier, Julme himself was accused of organizing a coup-de-etat against the son landing him back at Fort Dimanche. Julme was discovered to be consigning weapons across Haiti. While in prison, he distributed photos of himself and said "I still intend to become president."

Julme was later part of a Haitian political release program when UN member states put pressure on Haiti's government to stop political repression. In later UN reports, Julme is stated as having been arbitrarily arrested and eventually deported with "the [Haitian] police giving him a passport and an airplane ticket to France."

Julme returned to Haiti and ran for the Presidency in 1987.
