= Jean-Claude Duperval =

Haitian military officer (1947–2020)

General Jean-Claude Duperval
- Born: 1947; Haiti
- Died: 21 May 2020 (aged 72–73); Haiti
- Military career
- Allegiance: Haiti
- Branch: Armed Forces of Haiti
- Rank: Major General
- Commands: Acting Commander-in-Chief of the Armed Forces of Haiti

Jean-Claude Duperval (1947 – 21 May 2020) was a Haitian military officer, who served as the Acting Commander-in-Chief of the Armed Forces of Haiti from 10 October to 17 November 1994, during Operation Uphold Democracy. Previously, during the military dictatorship of Raoul Cédras from 1992 to 1994, he served as the Deputy Commander-in-Chief to Cédras, whom he succeeded.

He was convicted in absentia in November 2000 of crimes against humanity, for participating in the 1994 Raboteau massacre in Gonaïves, and sentenced to life imprisonment. He was deported from the United States (where he arrived in 1995; he settled in Orlo Vista, Florida, and worked at Walt Disney World from 1997 to 2002) in January 2004, and was held at the National Penitentiary in Port-au-Prince until his escape in February 2004, amidst the 2004 Haitian coup d'état.

Military offices
Preceded by Raoul Cédras	Commander-in-Chief of the Armed Forces of Haiti; Acting; 1994	Succeeded by Bernardin Poisson
