= Ministry of Defense (Haiti) =

Government minister of Haiti

- Ministère de la Défense d'Haiti (French); Ministè Defans (Haitian Creole)
- Coat of arms of Haiti

Agency overview
- Jurisdiction: Government of Haiti
- Headquarters: Grand Quartier Général Port-au-Prince
- Annual budget: 7.914 billion HTG (2024) ($60.5 million USD)
- Minister responsible: Mario Andrésol
- Website: Official website

The Ministry of Defense (French: Ministère de la Défense) is a ministry of the Government of Haiti. This ministry is responsible for military and defense of the country, along with playing an integral role in the Prime Minister's Cabinet.

== List of ministers ==
- 2 September 1804 - 17 October 1806: Etienne Gérin
- post suspended
- 14 March 1843 - 4 April 1843: André Laudun
- 4 April 1843 - 7 January 1844: Philippe Guerrier
- 7 January 1844 - 3 May 1844: Hérard Dumesle
- 3 May 1844 - 1 March 1846: Jacques Sylvain Hyppolite
- 1 March 1846 - 16 November 1846: Tape-à-l'Oeil Lazarre
- 16 November 1846 - 3 April 1847: Alexis Dupuy
- 3 April 1847 - 9 April 1848: Jean M. Paul
- 9 April 1848 - 15 January 1859: Louis Dufrene (duc de Tiburon)
- 17 January 1859 - 10 August 1861: Thimoléon Déjoie
- 10 August 1861 - 31 January 1863: Laguerre Obas
- 31 January 1863 - 13 August 1866: Théodate Philippeaux
- 13 August 1866 - 7 March 1867: Jean-Pierre Hector
- 7 March 1867 - 13 March 1867: J.J. Saint-Victor
- 8 May 1867 - 18 February 1869: Ménélas Clément
- 18 February 1869 - 6 September 1869: Casseus Daniel
- 6 September 1869 - 6 November 1869: Victorin Chevalier
- 8 November 1869 - 29 December 1869: Innocent Michel Pierre
- 29 December 1869 - 23 March 1870: Montmorency Benjamin
- 23 March 1870 - 27 April 1871: Pierre Monplaisir Pierre
- 27 April 1871 – 15 July 1871: Jean-François Cauvin
- 15 July 1871 - 15 May 1874: Saul Liautaud
- 15 May 1874 - 24 April 1876: Prosper Faure
- 24 April 1876 – 20 July 1876: Morin Montasse
- 20 July 1876 – 24 November 1876: Casseus Daniel (2nd time)
- 24 November 1876 - 17 July 1878: Auguste Montas
- 17 July 1878 - 14 November 1878: Turenne Carrié
- 14 November 1878 – 30 June 1879: Jean-Chrisostome François
- 30 June 1879 - 17 August 1879 : Armand Thoby (a.i)
- 1 September 1879 - 3 October 1879: Hériston Hérissé
- 3 October 1879 - 3 November 1879: Séïde Thélémaque
- 3 November 1879 - 31 December 1881: Henri Piquant
- 31 December 1881 - 14 March 1884: Innocent Michel Pierre (2nd time)
- 14 March 1884 - 15 May 1887: A. Roul Brenor Prophète
- 15 May 1887 - 10 August 1888: Tirésias Simon Sam
- September 1888 - 28 September 1888: Séïde Thélémaque
- 1 October 1888 - 15 October 1888: Pierre Théoma Boisrond-Canal
- 19 November 1888 - 27 April 1889: Anselme Prophète
- 27 April 1889 - 31 May 1889: Joseph Cadet Jérémie (a.i.)
- 31 May 1889 - 29 October 1889: Sénèque M. Pierre
- 29 October 1889 - 12 August 1890: Borno Monpoint
- 12 August 1890 - 19 August 1891: Jean-Baptiste Béliard
- 19 August 1891 - 11 August 1892: Morin Montasse
- 11 August 1892 - 5 October 1893: Turenne Jean-Gilles
- 5 October 1893 - 24 October 1893: Fabius Ducasse (a.i.)
- 24 October 1893 - 27 December 1893: Adelson Verne
- 27 December 1893 - 31 March 1896: Tirésias Simon Sam (2nd time)
- 6 April 1896 - 17 December 1896: Borno Monpoint (2nd time)
- 17 December 1896 - 13 December 1897: Septimus Marius
- 13 December 1897 - 12 May 1902: Vilbrun Guillaume Sam
- 20 May 1902 - 21 December 1902: Pierre Nord Alexis
- 22 December 1902 - 6 December 1908: Cyriaque Célestin
- 8 December 1908 - 19 December 1908: Charles Roland
- 19 December 1908 - 19 July 1911: Septimus Marius (2nd time)
- 20 July 1911 - 4 August 1911: Horelle Monplaisir
- 4 August 1911 - 16 August 1911: Oreste Zamor
- 16 August 1911 - 16 September 1912: Horacius Limage Philippe
- 16 September 1912 - 17 May 1913: François Beaufossé Laroche
- 17 May 1913 – February 1914: Philippe Argant
- 8 February 1914 – 11 November 1914: Félesmin Etienne
- 11 November 1914 – 27 February 1915: Charles Salnave
- 9 March 1915 – 30 April 1915: Mizaël Codio
- 30 April 1915 – 27 July 1915: Jean-François Milfort
- 14 August 1915 - 3 October 1915: Charles Leconte
- 3 October 1915 - 18 December 1915: Joseph Dessources
- 18 December 1915 - 9 May 1916: Annulysse André
- Post abolished
- 1942–1946: Vély Thébaud
- 1946: Paul Magloire
- 1947–1948: Georges Honorat
- 1948–1950: Louis Raymond
- 1950: Castel Démesmin
- 1950: Paul Magloire
- 1950: Luc Fouché
- 1950–1952: Arsène Magloire
- 1952–1953: Paracelse Pélissier
- 1953–1954: Ducasse Jumelle
- 1954–1955: Luc Prophète
- 1955–1956: Adelphin Telson
- 1956: Alphonse Racine
- 1956–1957: Rodolphe Barau
- 1957: Thézalus Pierre-Etienne
- 1957: Léonce Bernard
- 1957: Seymour Lamothe
- 1957: Gaston Georges
- 1957–1959: Frédéric Duvigneau
- 1959: Jean A. Magloire
- 1959–1961: Aurèle Joseph
- 1961–1962: Boileau Méhu
- 1962–1964: Luc D. François
- 1964–1967: Jean M. Julmé
- 1967: Morille Figaro
- 1967–1971: Aurèle Joseph
- 1971–1972: Luckner Cambronne
- 1972–1973: Roger Lafontant
- 1973–1974: Breton Nazaire
- 1974–1976: Paul Blanchet
- 1976–1977: Pierre Biamby
- 1977–1978: Aurélien Jeanty
- 1978–1979: Achille Salvant
- 1979: Bertholand Edouard
- 1979–1980: Claude Raymond
- 1980–1981: Frantz Médard
- 1981–1982: Edouard Berrouet
- 1982: Joseph Alexis Guerrier
- 1982–1985: Roger Lafontant
- 1985: François Guillaume
- 1985: Jean-Marie Chanoine
- 1985–1986: Pierre Merceron
- 1986–1988: Williams Régala
- 1988–1989: Carl Dorsainville
- 1989: Acédius Saint-Louis
- 1989–1990: Fritz Romulus
- 1990–1991: Jean Thomas
- 1991: René Préval
- 1991–1992: Gracia Jean
- 1992: Serge M. Charles
- 1992–1993: Carl-Michel Nicholas
- 1993–1994: Jean Béliotte
- 1994: Willio Noailles
- 1994: Carl-Michel Nicholas
- 1994–1996: Wilthan Lhérisson
- 1996–2011: Post abolished
- 2011–2012: Thierry Mayard-Paul
- 2012–2014: Jean Rodolphe Joazile
- 2014–2016: Lener Renaud
- 2016-2017:Enex Jean-Charles
- 2017-2019:Hervé Denis
- 2020 - 2021: Jean W. Dorneval
- 2021-2024: Énold Joseph
- 2024: Jean-Marc Bernier Antoine
- 2024-2026: Jean Michel Moïse
- 2026–present: Mario Andrésol

== See also ==
- Haiti
  - List of heads of state of Haiti
  - Prime Minister of Haiti
  - List of colonial governors of Saint-Domingue
