= Barry Paris =

American author and journalist

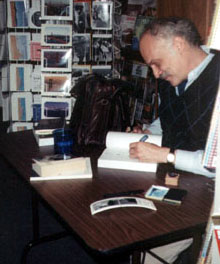
Barry Paris signing books at The Booksmith in San Francisco

Barry Paris (born February 6, 1948) is an author and journalist based in Pittsburgh, Pennsylvania.

Paris' best-known works include biographies of film stars Louise Brooks, Greta Garbo and Audrey Hepburn. He was a movie reviewer for the Pittsburgh Post-Gazette, and co-hosted a weekly radio show on WQED-FM. Paris has won awards for cultural and investigative reporting. He is currently engaged in writing a biography of Franklin Pierce (tentatively titled Pierce in Oblivion), the 14th President of the United States.

== Biographic works ==
Louise Brooks (Knopf, 1989) is Paris's biography of the silent film star. Louise Brooks was named Film Book of the Year by Leonard Maltin. In reviewing the book, the Daily Express stated "Barry Paris has written the model of a movie biography". Similarly, the Irish Times added, "In a short review it is impossible to give even a taste of the splendor of Mr Paris's work. It is one of the best biographies I have ever read, erudite, literate and always in search of its subject." The book was published in Europe and South America and remains in print in the United States. Along with this biography, Paris has written articles on the actress and scripted the Emmy-nominated documentary Louise Brooks: Looking for Lulu (1998).

Paris authored Tony Curtis: The Autobiography (William Heinemann, 1993); Garbo (Knopf, 1995); Audrey Hepburn (Putnam, 1996), a biography of the iconic actress which was published in eight countries and Song of Haiti (Public Affairs, 2000), the story of Dr Larry and Gwen Mellon and their hospital at Deschapelles, Haiti.

Paris contributed 15 Minutes, But Who's Counting? Andy Warhol and His Icons to The Warhol Look: Glamour, Style, Fashion (Bulfinch Press, 1997); and edited and wrote the preface to Stella Adler on Ibsen, Strindberg, and Chekhov (Knopf, 1999), a collection of talks by the legendary drama teacher. A second, Paris-edited, collection of Stella Adler's talks is in preparation.

As well as the above-mentioned books, Paris published profiles of the novelist and Mozart biographer Marcia Davenport and the early film star Lina Basquette in The New Yorker. Other publications to which he has contributed articles, reviews and interviews include Vanity Fair, Opera News, American Film, Art and Antiques and (The Washington Post).

Paris is a 1969 graduate of Columbia University (where he studied film and Slavic languages) and of the Institute for the Study of the USSR in Munich, where he wrote Russian Cinema and the Soviet Film Industry, an early survey of the subject. Paris is fluent in Russian, Czech, Ukrainian, and Spanish, and has translated plays by Anton Chekhov.

Paris was the editor-publisher of the Prairie Journal of Wichita, Kansas from 1972–1974; feature editor of The Miami Herald from 1979–1980 and critic/reporter of the Pittsburgh Post-Gazette from 1980–1986. From 1981 to 2006 he co-hosted The Sunday Arts Magazine on radio station WQED-FM. The weekly program covered the Pittsburgh/Western Pennsylvania cultural and classical music scene. Among his journalistic awards are the National Sunday Magazine Editors' Best Feature (1993), Pennsylvania Press Association's Best Cultural Story (1982) and three Matrix Awards (1980, 1981, 1993).
