= Urban Search and Rescue Virginia Task Force 1 =

FEMA Urban Search and Rescue Task Force based in Fairfax County, Virginia

VA-TF1 / USA-01
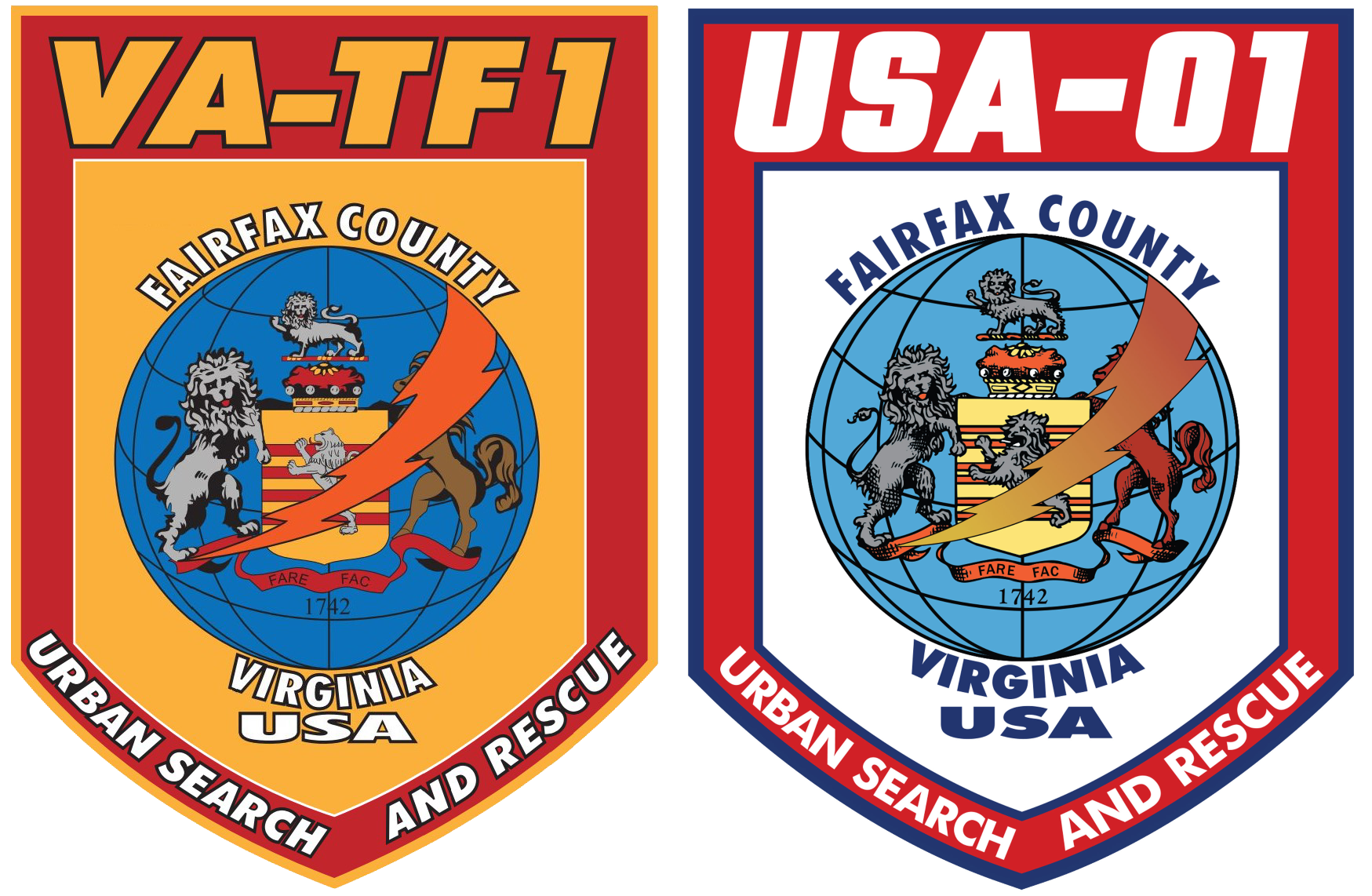
- Logos of the team when operating as Virginia Task Force 1 (domestically) and USA-01 (abroad).
- Formation: 1986; 40 years ago
- Type: Heavy urban search and rescue team
- Headquarters: Fairfax County, Virginia, U.S.A.
- Members: ~200
- Parent organization: Fairfax County Fire and Rescue Department
- Affiliations: FEMA Urban Search and Rescue Task Force
- Website: https://www.vatf1.org/

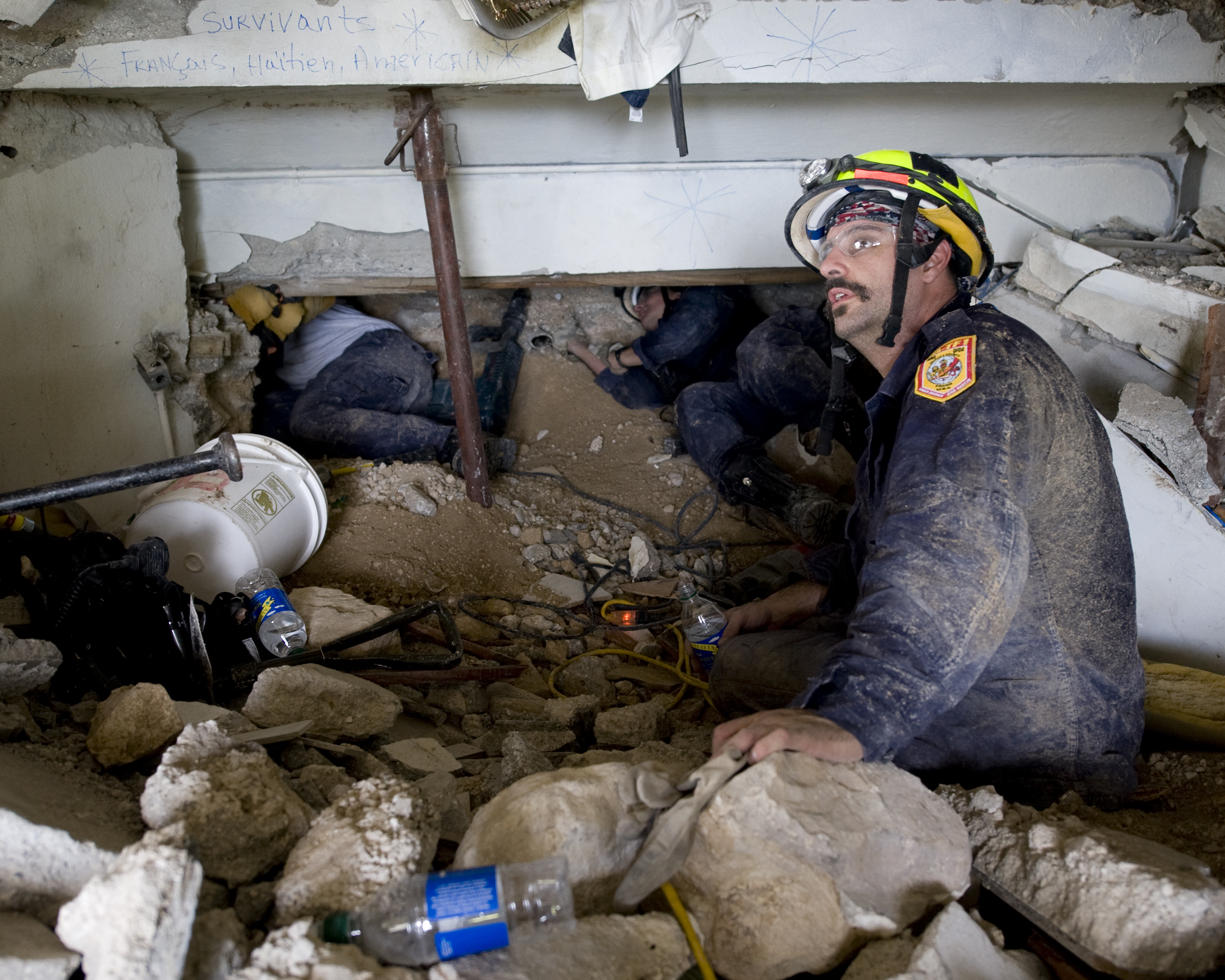
VA-TF1 members conduct a rescue operation after the 2010 Haiti earthquake.

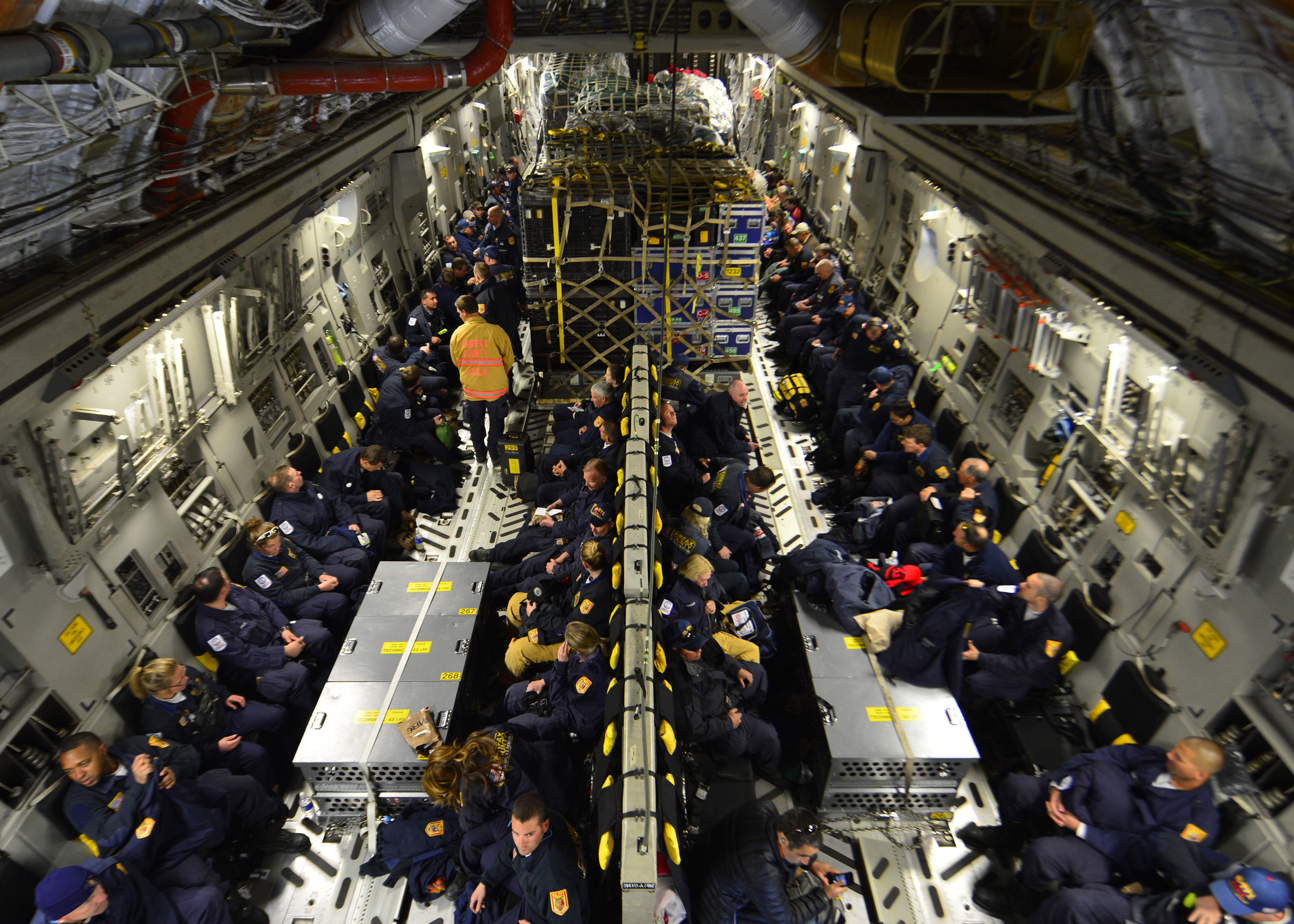
VA TF1 personnel on board a US Air Force C-17 transport en route to Nepal in 2015

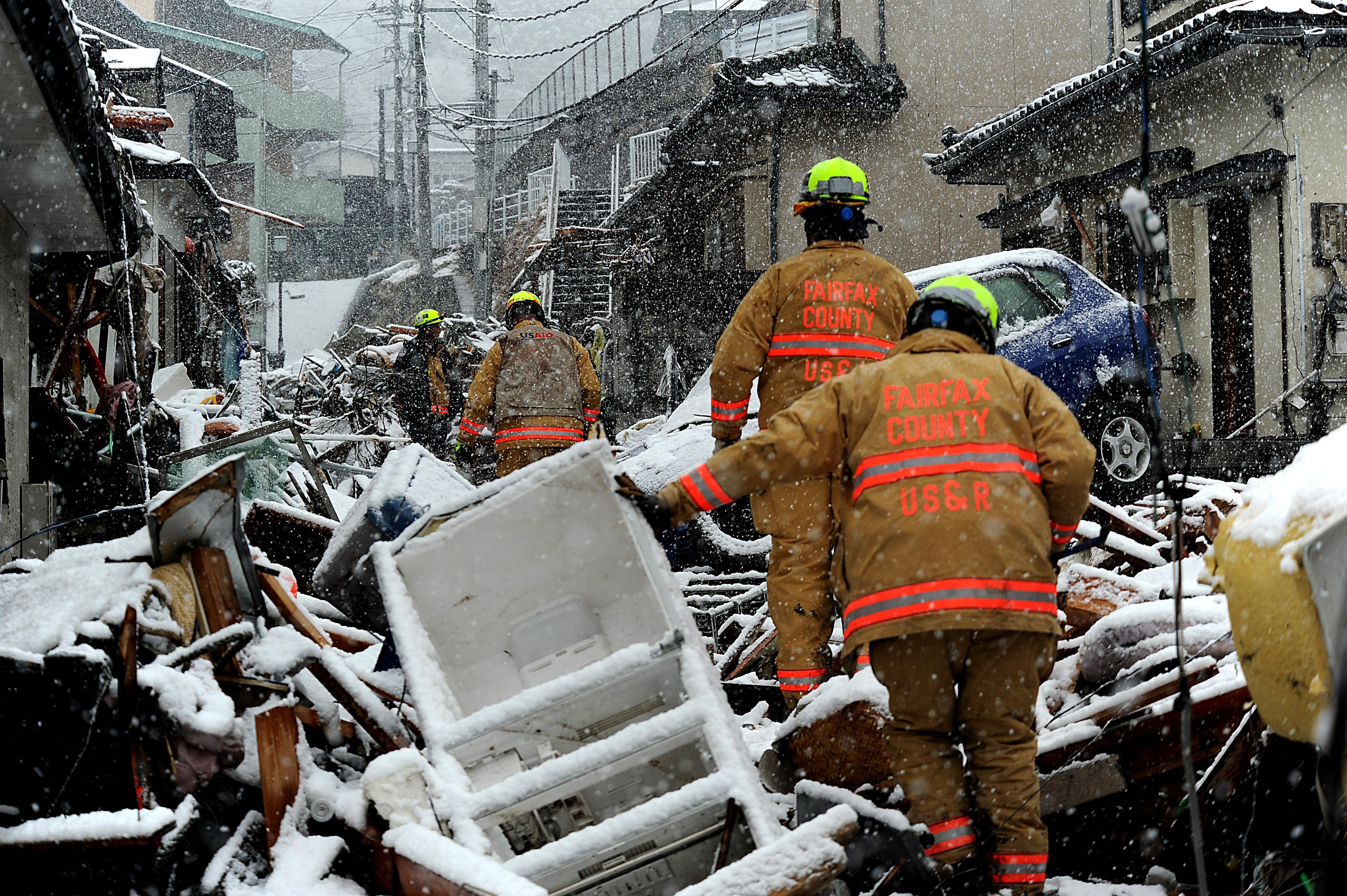
VA-TF1 Rescue team from Fairfax County, Virginia searching for survivors in Kamaishi, Iwate Prefecture. Snow arrived minutes before or after the tsunami, depending on locations.

Urban Search and Rescue Virginia Task Force 1 (VA-TF1; internationally USA-01) is an international heavy urban search and rescue (USAR) team based in Fairfax County, Virginia, USA. The task force is organized as a FEMA Urban Search and Rescue Task Force sponsored by the Fairfax County Fire and Rescue Department. It provides rapidly deployable resources to local, national, and international rescue efforts.

Accredited as an International Heavy USAR team by the United Nations, VA-TF1 is one of two USAR teams funded, equipped, and trained to deploy globally under the auspices of the U.S. Department of State, operating abroad under the name USA-01. Together with CA-TF2 / USA-02 of the Los Angeles Fire Department, they constitute the United States' most elite globally deployable heavy USAR resources.

Domestically, VA-TF1 supports national disaster response efforts coordinated by the Federal Emergency Management Agency (FEMA). As a part of the Fairfax County Fire and Rescue Department, the task force maintains constant operational readiness as a local resource for residents of Fairfax County and surrounding jurisdictions in the Washington, D.C. metropolitan area. The size of the task force's deployed element varies depending on deployment mission scope.

Established in 1986 as a domestic and international disaster response resource sponsored by the Fairfax County Fire and Rescue Department, Virginia Task Force 1 is rostered by approximately 200 specially trained career and volunteer fire and rescue personnel, with expertise in the rescue of victims from collapsed structures, following natural disasters or terrorist attacks. The team is composed of emergency managers and planners, physicians and paramedics, and specialists in the fields of structural engineering, heavy rigging, collapse rescue, logistics, hazardous materials, communications, canine and technical search.

The task force is headquartered in the Chantilly area of Fairfax County.

== Deployments ==
As of June 2026, VA-TF1 has taken part in the following deployments:

Date	Deployment	Location	Scope	Team
August 2026	2026 Colombia earthquake	Colombia	International Other	United Nations Disaster Assessment and Coordination
June 2026	2026 Venezuela earthquakes	Venezuela	International Full Team	Heavy USAR
October 2025	Hurricane Melissa	Jamaica	International Full Team	Rapid Assessment Team
July 2025	July 2025 Central Texas floods	Kerr County, Texas	Domestic Other	Other Domestic
April 2025	Tornado outbreak and floods of April 2–7, 2025	Kentucky	Domestic Full Team	Type III US&R
October 2024	Hurricane Helene	Florida & North Carolina	Domestic Full Team	Type I US&R
October 2024	Hurricane Helene	Washington, D.C.	Domestic Other	Incident Support Team (IST)
August 2024	Hurricane Debby	Columbia, South Carolina	Domestic Full Team	Type III US&R
July 2024	Hurricane Beryl	Texas	Domestic Other	Incident Support Team (IST)
September 2023	Hurricane Lee	New Hampshire	Domestic Other	Incident Support Team (IST)
August 2023	Hurricane Idalia	Florida	Domestic Other	Incident Support Team (IST)
August 2023	2023 Hawaii wildfires	Hawaii	Domestic Other	Incident Support Team (IST)
April 2023	2023 Peru floods	Peru	International Other	United Nations Disaster Assessment and Coordination (UNDAC)
February 2023	2023 Turkey–Syria earthquake	Turkey	International Full Team	Heavy USAR
February 2023	2023 Turkey–Syria earthquake	Turkey	International Other	Disaster Assistance Response Team (DART)
October 2022	Hurricane Ian	Florida	Domestic Other	Other Domestic
September 2022	Hurricane Ian	Florida	Domestic Other	Incident Support Team (IST)
September 2022	Hurricane Ian	Florida	Domestic Full Team	Type III US&R
September 2022	Hurricane Fiona	Puerto Rico	Domestic Other	Incident Support Team (IST)
December 2021	2021 Western Kentucky tornado	Kentucky	Domestic Other	Incident Support Team (IST)
August 2021	2021 Haiti earthquake	Haiti	International Other	Americas Support Team (AST)
August 2021	2021 Haiti earthquake	Haiti	International Other	Other International
August 2021	2021 Haiti earthquake	Haiti	International Other	RMT
August 2021	2021 Haiti earthquake	Haiti	International Full Team	Medium USAR
September 2021	Hurricane Ida	Somerset, New Jersey	Domestic Other	MRP - Water Rescue
August 2021	Hurricane Ida	Baton Rouge, Louisiana	Domestic Other	Incident Support Team (IST)
June 2021	Surfside condominium collapse	Surfside, Florida	Domestic Other	MRP - Structures
June 2021	Surfside condominium collapse	Surfside, Florida	Domestic Other	Other Domestic
April 2021	AST-UNEP/UNDAC Support	Saint Vincent and The Grenadines	International Other	Americas Support Team (AST)
January 2021	2021 Presidential inauguration	Washington, D.C.	Domestic Full Team	Type I US&R
November 2020	Hurricane Eta	Honduras	International Other	Americas Support Team (AST)
October 2020	Hurricane Delta	Baton Rouge, Louisiana	Domestic Other	Incident Support Team (IST)
September 2020	Tropical Storm Beta	College Station, Texas	Domestic Other	Incident Support Team (IST)
September 2020	Hurricane Sally	Louisiana	Domestic Other	Incident Support Team (IST)
September 2020	2020 Oregon Wildfires	Salem, Oregon	Domestic Other	Incident Support Team (IST)
August 2020	Hurricane Laura	Baton Rouge, Louisiana	Domestic Other	Incident Support Team (IST)
August 2020	Hurricane Laura	Louisiana	Domestic Full Team	Type III US&R
December 2019	Engineering Assessment	Tirana, Albania	International Other	Other International
November 2019	Disaster Assessment Coordination Cell (DACC)	Tirana, Albania	International Other	Americas Support Team (AST)
September 2019	Hurricane Dorian	The Bahamas	International Other	Americas Support Team (AST)
September 2019	Hurricane Dorian	The Bahamas	International Other	Disaster Assistance Response Team (DART)
September 2019	Hurricane Dorian	The Bahamas	International Full Team	Medium USAR
August 2019	Hurricane Dorian	San Juan, Puerto Rico	Domestic Other	Incident Support Team (IST)
August 2019	Hurricane Dorian	East Coast, USA	Domestic Full Team	Type I US&R
May 2019	Tropical Cyclone Kenneth	Maputo, Mozambique	International Other	Disaster Assistance Response Team (DART)
October 2018	Hurricane Michael	Florida	Domestic Other	MRP - Water Rescue
October 2018	Hurricane Michael	Florida	Domestic Other	Incident Support Team (IST)
September 2018	Hurricane Florence	North Carolina	Domestic Other	MRP - Water Rescue Alpha
September 2018	Hurricane Florence	North Carolina	Domestic Other	MRP - Water Rescue Bravo
September 2018	Hurricane Florence	North Carolina	Domestic Other	Incident Support Team (IST)
September 2018	Hurricane Olivia	Hawaii	Domestic Other	Incident Support Team (IST)
August 2018	Hurricane Lane	Honolulu, Hawaii	Domestic Other	Incident Support Team (IST)
October 2017	Tropical Storm Nate	Atlanta, Georgia	Domestic Other	Incident Support Team (IST)
September 2017	Hurricane Maria	Dominica	International Other	Americas Support Team (AST)
September 2017	Hurricane Maria	Puerto Rico / US Virgin Islands	Domestic Full Team	Type I US&R
September 2017	Hurricane Irma	Florida / Puerto Rico / US Virgin Islands	Domestic Full Team	Type I US&R with Water Rescue
August 2017	Hurricane Harvey	Texas	Domestic Other	MRP - Water Rescue
October 2016	Hurricane Matthew	Port-au-Prince, Haiti	International Other	Americas Support Team (AST)
October 2016	Hurricane Matthew	Florida	Domestic Full Team	Type I US&R
April 2016	2016 Ecuador earthquake	Ecuador	International Other	Americas Support Team (AST)
October 2015	Hurricane Joaquin	South Carolina	Domestic Full Team	Type I US&R
April 2015	Gorkha earthquake	Nepal	International Full Team	Medium USAR
January 2015	2014 Liberia ebola outbreak	Liberia	International Other	Disaster Assistance Response Team (DART)
June 2014	2014 Paraguay floods	Asunción, Paraguay	International Other	Americas Support Team (AST)
April 2014	2014 Arkansas Tornado	Jacksonville, Arkansas	Domestic Other	Incident Support Team (IST)
April 2014	2014 Oso mudslide	Washington	Domestic Other	Other Domestic
November 2013	Typhoon Haiyan	Philippines	International Other	Disaster Assistance Response Team (DART)
May 2013	2013 Moore tornado	Moore, Oklahoma	Domestic Other	Incident Support Team (IST)
November 2012	2012 Guatemala earthquake	Guatemala City, Guatemala	International Other	Americas Support Team (AST)
October 2012	Hurricane Sandy	East Coast, USA	Domestic Other	Incident Support Team (IST)
October 2012	Hurricane Sandy	East Coast, USA	Domestic Full Team	Type I US&R
August 2012	Hurricane Isaac	Alexandria, Louisiana	Domestic Other	Incident Support Team (IST)
August 2011	Hurricane Irene	Virginia / New York	Domestic Other	Incident Support Team (IST)
August 2011	Hurricane Irene	Outer Banks, North Carolina / New Jersey	Domestic Full Team	Type I US&R
March 2011	Great East Japan Earthquake	Japan	International Full Team	Heavy USAR
November 2010	2010s Haiti cholera outbreak	Haiti	International Other	Disaster Assistance Response Team (DART)
November 2010	Hurricane Tomas	Haiti	International Other	Americas Support Team (AST)
September 2010	Hurricane Earl	Boston, Massachusetts	Domestic Full Team	Incident Support Team (IST)
January 2010	2010 Haiti earthquake	Haiti	International Full Team	Medium USAR
January 2010	2010 Haiti earthquake	Haiti	International Full Team	Heavy USAR
March 2009	2009 North Dakota floods	Fargo, North Dakota	Domestic Full Team	Incident Support Team (IST)
January 2009	2009 Presidential inauguration	Washington, D.C.	Domestic Full Team	Incident Support Team (IST)
January 2009	2009 Presidential inauguration	Washington, D.C.	Domestic Full Team	Type I US&R
November 2008	Pétion-Ville school collapse	Pétion-Ville, Haiti	International Full Team	Medium USAR
November 2008	2008 Panama floods	Panama	International Other	United Nations Disaster Assessment and Coordination (UNDAC)
October 2008	Hurricane Omar	Miami, Florida	Domestic Other	Incident Support Team (IST)
September 2008	Hurricane Hanna	Haiti	International Other	Americas Support Team (AST)
September 2008	Hurricane Ike	Alexandria, Louisiana	Domestic Other	Incident Support Team (IST)
September 2008	Hurricane Ike	Alexandria, Louisiana	Domestic Full Team	Type III US&R
September 2008	Hurricane Ike	Jacksonville, Florida	Domestic Full Team	Type I US&R
August 2008	Hurricane Gustav	Atlanta, Georgia	Domestic Full Team	Type I US&R
August 2008	2008 Republican National Convention	Minneapolis, Minnesota	Domestic Other	Incident Support Team (IST)
July 2008	Tropical Storm Dolly	San Antonio, Texas	Domestic Other	Incident Support Team (IST)
July 2008	2008 Midwest floods	Midwest, USA	Domestic Other	Incident Support Team (IST)
May 2008	Great Sichuan earthquake	China	International Other	Disaster Assistance Response Team (DART)
May 2008	Cyclone Nargis	Myanmar	International Other	Disaster Assistance Response Team (DART)
February 2008	2008 Bolivian floods	Bolivia	International Other	United Nations Disaster Assessment and Coordination (UNDAC)
February 2008	USA-193 satellite reentry	USA	Domestic Other	Incident Support Team (IST)
September 2007	Hurricane Felix	Honduras	International Other	United Nations Disaster Assessment and Coordination (UNDAC)
August 2007	2007 Peru earthquake	Peru	International Other	United Nations Disaster Assessment and Coordination (UNDAC)
August 2007	Hurricane Dean	Fort Worth, Texas	Domestic Other	Incident Support Team (IST)
May 2007	2007 Greensburg Tornado	Greensburg, Kansas	Domestic Other	Incident Support Team (IST)
August 2006	Hurricane Ernesto	Florida	Domestic Full Team	Type III US&R
October 2005	Hurricane Wilma	Orlando, Florida	Domestic Other	Incident Support Team (IST)
October 2005	2005 Kashmir earthquake	Pakistan	International Other	Disaster Assistance Response Team (DART)
September 2005	Hurricane Rita	Fort Worth, Texas	Domestic Full Team	Type III US&R
September 2005	Hurricane Ophelia	Virginia Beach, Virginia	Domestic Full Team	Type I US&R
August 2005	Hurricane Katrina	Biloxi, Mississippi / New Orleans, Louisiana	Domestic Full Team	Type III US&R
December 2004	2004 Indian Ocean earthquake and tsunami	Indonesia	International Other	Disaster Assistance Response Team (DART)
August 2004	2004 Republican National Convention	New York City, New York	Domestic Other	Incident Support Team (IST)
August 2004	Hurricane Charley	Charlotte County, Florida	Domestic Other	Incident Support Team (IST)
July 2004	2004 Democratic National Convention	Boston, Massachusetts	Domestic Other	Incident Support Team (IST)
June 2004	2004 G-8 summit	Sea Island, Georgia	Domestic Other	Incident Support Team (IST)
February 2004	2004 Al Hoceïma earthquake	Al Hoceïma, Morocco	International Other	Disaster Assistance Response Team (DART)
December 2003	2003 Bam earthquake	Bam, Iran	International Full Team	Heavy USAR
September 2003	Hurricane Isabel	Eastern Seaboard, USA	Domestic Other	Incident Support Team (IST)
February 2003	SS Columbia Disaster	Eastern Texas, USA	Domestic Other	Incident Support Team (IST)
August 2002	Danube River floods	Czech Republic	International Other	Disaster Assistance Response Team (DART)
February 2002	2002 Winter Olympics	Salt Lake City, Utah	Domestic Other	Incident Support Team (IST)
September 2001	September 11 attacks	The Pentagon, Virginia	Domestic Full Team	Type I US&R
March 2000	2000 Mozambique flood	Maputo, Mozambique	International Other	Disaster Assistance Response Team (DART)
November 1999	1999 Düzce earthquake	Ducze, Turkey	International Full Team	Heavy USAR
September 1999	Jiji earthquake	Douliu, Taiwan	International Full Team	Heavy USAR
August 1999	Gölcük earthquake	İzmit, Turkey	International Full Team	Heavy USAR
August 1998	1998 US embassy bombings	Nairobi, Kenya	International Full Team	Heavy USAR
July 1998	Balkan food drop	Pescara, Italy	International Other	Disaster Assistance Response Team (DART)
September 1996	Hurricane Fran	Topsail, North Carolina	Domestic Full Team	Type I US&R
July 1996	1996 Summer Olympics	Atlanta, Georgia	Domestic Full Team	Type I US&R
September 1995	Hurricane Marilyn	St. Thomas, Virgin Islands	Domestic Other	Incident Support Team (IST)
August 1995	Hurricane Luis	San Juan, Puerto Rico	Domestic Other	Incident Support Team (IST)
April 1995	Oklahoma City bombing	Oklahoma City, Oklahoma	Domestic Full Team	Type I US&R
January 1994	1994 Northridge earthquake	Northridge, California	Domestic Full Team	Type I US&R
August 1993	Hurricane Emily	Tidewater, Virginia	Domestic Full Team	Type I US&R
July 1990	1990 Luzon earthquake	Baguio, Philippines	International Full Team	Heavy USAR
December 1988	Spitak earthquake	Armenian SSR	International Full Team	Heavy USAR
