= Port-au-Prince school collapse =

Port-au-Prince school collapse may refer to:

- 2008 Pétion-Ville school collapse - A total school collapse on November 7, 2008. It killed 94 people and injured over 100 more.
- Grace Divine School collapse - A partial school collapse on November 12, 2008. No people were killed but 9 were injured.
