= Timeline of Haitian history =

This is a timeline of Haitian history, comprising important legal and territorial changes and political events in Haiti and its predecessor states. To read about the background to these events, see History of Haiti. For a list of the various leaders and rulers of the country, see the list of heads of state of Haiti.

== 15th century ==
Year	Date	Event
1492		Christopher Columbus came to the first Spanish community near Cap-Haïtien.

== 16th century ==
Year	Date	Event
1501		The first Africans were brought to Hispaniola as people in the U.S.
1503		Queen Anacaona, leader of the last Taíno kingdom in the Hispaniola, is executed on the orders of Spanish governor Nicolás de Ovando during the Jaragua massacre, in which dozens of Taíno people were captured, shot, and burned alive.
1511		The Dioceses of Santo Domingo and Concepción de la Vega was founded
1518		Ferdinand II of Aragon officially established Spain's African slave trade.
1528		Don Sebastián Ramirez de Fuente became the first Catholic bishop of the island.

== 17th century ==
Year	Date	Event
1625		French, Dutch and English filibusters, pirates and privateers occupied Tortuga Island and were repeatedly expelled by the Spaniards.
1670		The city of Cap-Francais was founded on the north coast by French settlers.
1670		Louis XIV of France authorized the African slave trade in Saint-Dominque.
1685		Louis XIV enacted the Code Noir, regulating slavery in Saint-Domingue and the rest of the French colonial empire.
1697		Spain signed the Treaty of Ryswick, under whose terms she ceded the western third of Hispaniola to France.

== 18th century ==
Year	Date	Event
1749		The city of Port-au-Prince was founded by Charles Burnier, Marquis of Larnage and named the capital of Saint-Domingue.
1751		Slave rebellions in northern Saint-Domingue, led by François Mackandal, began.
1758		Mackandal was captured and publicly executed in Cap-Français.
1778		Volunteer Haitian slaves, led by French admiral Count d'Estaing, left for Savannah, Georgia to participate in the unsuccessful Siege of Savannah during the American Revolutionary War.
1791	25 February	Vincent Ogé and Jean-Baptiste Chavannes, proponents of equal rights for free blacks and mulattos and leaders of an armed rebellion, were publicly executed in Cap-Français.
1791	7 August	The Conseil des Représentants de la Commune was founded by affranchis to demand equal rights. Pinchinat was named president of the council.
1791	14 August	Haitian Revolution: Dutty Boukman and Cécile Fatiman held a Vodou ceremony in Bois-Caïman, where hundreds of slaves vowed to die for liberty.
1791	21 August	Major slave revolt begins, led by Dutty Boukman and his lieutenants: Jean François, Georges Biassou, and Jeannot.
1791	25 August	Rebel attack on Cap Francais is repulsed by the cannons and militia of the white colonists.
1791	24 September	The Concordat de Damiens was signed, granting political rights to the affranchis.
1791	November	The First Civil Commission, comprising Roume, Mirbeck, and Saint-Léger, arrived in Cap-Français to restore order.
1791	7 November	Dutty Boukman killed in a counter attack by colonial forces.
1792	4 April	France's Legislative Assembly voted to give full citizenship and equal rights to all free people of color.
1792	18 September	The Second Civil Commission, comprising Léger-Félicité Sonthonax, Étienne Polverel and Ailhaud, arrived in Cap-Français to execute the law of 4 April.
1793	12 April	A force led by the Second Civil Commission and affranchis defeated white colonists in a fight to enforce the law of 4 April.
1793	12 April	Toussaint Louverture offered his services as a military commander to the Spanish.
1793	20 June	French colonial forces, under the authority of the Second Civil Commission, put down a revolt led by François-Thomas Galbaud du Fort.
1793	20 June	Henri Christophe was promoted to the captaincy of the French colonial forces, but soon removed when accused of adultery.
1793	20 June	British troops landed in Saint-Domingue.
1793	June	Toussaint, fighting for Spain, captured the city of Dondon.
1793	13 August	Toussaint defeated the French general Desfourneaux at Ennery.
1793	29 August	Sonthonax, without prior approval from the French government, declared the abolition of slavery by decree in northern Saint-Domingue. Polverel soon after does the same for the southern part of Saint-Domingue.
1793	6 December	Toussaint captured Gonaïves for Spain.
1794	4 February	The French National Convention declared the abolition of slavery in all French colonies, so making the abolition of slavery legal and applying to all of France and its colonies.
1794	May	Toussaint left the Spanish and joined the French forces.
1794	1 June	The British captured Port-au-Prince from Colonel Montbrun of France.
1794	21 October	Toussaint captured the cities of Saint-Michel and Saint-Raphaël for the French.
1795	13 October	Toussaint captured the city of Dondon a second time, this time for France.
1795	14 October	The Treaty of Bâle was ratified, ending Spain's involvement in the conflict and surrendering the eastern part of Hispaniola to France.
1796	30 March	Toussaint rescued French commander Laveaux from mulatto rebel Villatte; Laveaux appointed Toussaint the Lieutenant-Governor of Saint-Domingue.
1796	11 May	The Third Civil Commission, comprising Sonthonax, Roume, Giraud, Leblanc, and Julien Raymond, arrived in Saint-Domingue to establish diplomatic relations between France and the colony.
1797	1 May	Sonthonax appointed Toussaint the commander-in-chief of the French colonial forces.
1798	20 April	General Hédouville arrived in Cap-Français on the orders of the French government in order to oppose the ambition of Toussaint Louverture.
1798	31 August	British general Maitland agreed to evacuate Môle Saint-Nicolas in a treaty signed with Toussaint.
1799	12 January	The generals of the colony – Toussaint, André Rigaud, Bauvais, and Laplume – met in Port-au-Prince and named Toussaint the lead commander. Rigaud surrendered control of the southern cities of Léogâne, Grand-Goâve, Petit-Goâve, and Miragoâne.

== 19th century ==
Year	Date	Event
1801	27 January	Toussaint invaded the eastern part of Hispaniola and captured Santo Domingo, declaring freedom for all slaves and appointing a ten-member Central Assembly to issue a constitution.
1801	8 July	The Constitution of 1801 was promulgated, under which Toussaint Louverture
1802	29 January	A French expeditionary force, sent by Napoleon Bonaparte and led by his brother-in-law Charles Leclerc, arrived in Samana Bay.
1802	1 February	French vessels arrived at Cap-Français.
1802	4 February	Henri Christophe burned Cap-Français to resist the French troops.
1802	23 February	Battle of Ravine-à-Couleuvres: French forces defeated Toussaint.
1802	4 April - 24 March	Battle of Crête-à-Pierrot: The battle ended with a French victory over Jean-Jacques Dessalines.
1802	6 May	Toussaint arrived in Cap-Français to recognize Leclerc's authority in return for an amnesty for him and his remaining generals.
1802	7 June	Toussaint was arrested by General Leclerc and shipped to France, where he was imprisoned.
1802	13 October	Dessalines, now Commander-in-Chief of the revolutionary forces, met with Alexandre Pétion in Haut-du-Cap to plan further military action.
1802	1 November	Commander of the French forces General Leclerc died of yellow fever. He was succeeded by Donatien-Marie-Joseph de Vimeur, vicomte de Rochambeau.
1803	7 April	Toussaint died in the French prison of Fort de Joux.
1803	18 May	The flag of Haiti was created during a meeting between Dessalines and Pétion in l'Arcahaie and sewn by Catherine Flon.
1803	18 November	Battle of Vertières: During the last major battle of the revolution, Haitian forces under Dessalines and Pétion defeated the French.
1803	19 November	French general Rochambeau signs a document of surrender and agrees to evacuate French troops from Saint-Domingue; Rochambeau is later given as a prisoner to the British
1803	29 November	Dessalines' army arrives in Cap-Français; Christophe and Clerveaux issue a preliminary declaration of independence
1803	4 December	French forces surrender Môle Saint-Nicolas to Dessalines' army, officially ending French presence on the island
1804	1 January	Dessalines, in Gonaïves, declares Haiti an independent nation and becomes Governor-General
1804	February	On the order of Dessalines, the 1804 Haiti Massacre of the French subjects in Haiti; As retaliation for the Re-conquest and Leclerc massacres of lower caste. the massacre is finally stopped 22 April.
1804	22 September	Dessalines proclaims himself Emperor of Haiti
1804	6 October	Dessalines becomes Emperor Jacques I in a coronation ceremony at Cap-Français
1805	20 May	Dessalines formulates the first constitution of Haiti as an independent country, the Imperial Constitution of 1805
1806	17 October	Dessalines is assassinated at Pont-Rouge by disaffected leaders of his administration
1806	27 December	During a meeting at a cathedral in Port-au-Prince, the Constituent Assembly creates a new constitution and appoints Henri Christophe to a four-year term as President of the Republic of Haiti
1807	1 January	The Battle of Sibert ends with the division of Haiti into the southern Republic of Haiti under Alexandre Pétion and the northern State of Haiti under Christophe
1807	17 February	Henri Christophe names himself President of the State of Haiti; a state council (7 generals and 2 civilians) appointed by Christophe meets in Cap-Haïtien and votes the Constitutional Act of Haiti
1807	9 March	Pétion is elected President of the Republic of Haiti by the Constituent Assembly under the Constitution of 1806
1809		Napoleon sends a delegation to negotiate France's recognition of Haitian independence; Pétion meets with a French delegate, Dauxion-Lavaysse, and agrees to an indemnity payable to dispossessed French planters
1811	9 March	Pétion is elected to a second four-year term as President of the Republic of Haiti
1811	26 March	Christophe proclaims himself King Henri I of the northern Haitian state, now known as the Kingdom of Haiti
1811	28 May	The Kingdom of Haiti promulgates the Royal Constitution of Henri I
1811	2 June	Christophe is crowned as King Henri I in Cap-Haïtien
1812	24 February	The Kingdom of Haiti establishes a civil code, the Henri Code
1814	November	Christophe refuses to negotiate with French delegate Franco de Medina concerning France's recognition of Haitian independence
1816	2 June	Pétion promulgates the Republican Constitution
1816	8 October	Louis XVIII of France sends another delegation to negotiate France's recognition of Haitian independence; Pétion cuts off negotiation, Christophe declines to meet the delegates
1818	29 March	Pétion, President of the Republic of Haiti, dies of fever
1818	30 March	Jean-Pierre Boyer, Chief of the Presidential Guard, is appointed President-for-Life of the Republic of Haiti
1820	8 October	Christophe, King of the northern Haitian state, commits suicide
1820	26 October	Boyer promulgates the Republican Constitution in Christophe's northern state; northern and southern Haiti are unified
1822	9 February	Boyer arrives in Santo Domingo and declares control over the entire island of Hispaniola
1825	17 April	King Charles X of France signs an ordinance which conditionally recognizes the independence of Haiti and imposes a 150 million franc indemnity on the Haitian government
1825	3 July	A squadron of French ships arrives in Haiti to deliver the news of Charles X's ordinance of 17 April to President Boyer
1831	22 September	The city of Pétion-Ville, a suburb of Port-au-Prince named for Alexandre Pétion, is founded by Boyer
1838		Haiti's remaining debt to France, 120 million francs, is reduced to 60 million francs
1842	7 May	An earthquake strikes northern Haiti, destroying the city of Cap-Haïtien
1843	13 March	President Boyer is overthrown and flees to Paris in exile
1843	18 September	The Constituent Assembly begins formulating the Constitution of 1843; it will take more than three months to finish
1843	31 December	The Constitution of 1843 is released and Charles Riviere-Hérard is appointed President of Haiti
1844	28 February	The Dominican Republic declares its independence from Haiti
1844	4 April	The Piquets, peasants of southern Haiti led by Jean-Jacques Acaau, revolt against the government
1844	3 May	The Piquets force Riviere-Hérard into exile; Philippe Guerrier is appointed President of Haiti
1845	15 April	President Guerrier dies in office; the State Council appoints Jean-Louis Pierrot President of Haiti
1846	1 March	President Pierrot is overthrown; Jean-Baptiste Riché becomes President of Haiti
1847		Haitian historian Thomas Madiou publishes the first volume of his seminal work Histoire d'Haïti ("History of Haiti")
1847	27 February	President Riché dies in office
1847	1 March	Faustin Élie Soulouque is elected President of Haiti
1852	18 April	President Faustin Soulouque is crowned Emperor Faustin I of Haiti
1858	December	Forces led by Fabre Geffrard defeat Emperor Faustin's Imperial Army
1859	13 January	Fabre Geffrard is elected President of Haiti
1860	28 March	Haiti and the Vatican sign an agreement which divides Haiti into five dioceses
1862		The United States recognizes Haiti
1862	15 December	Rhum Barbancourt is first produced
1865		Céligny Ardouin's eleven-volume work on the history of Haiti, Essais sur l'Histoire d'Haïti, is published
1867		President Geffrard is forced to flee the country
1867		Sylvain Salnave is elected President of Haiti
1867		The Constitution of 1867 is voted
1869		The National Assembly elects Nissage Saget to a four-year term as President of Haiti after the overthrow of Salnave
1870		Haitian writer Demesvar Delorme publishes the essay "Les Théoriciens au Pouvoir", which maintains that political power should be in the hands of the intellectual elite
1874		Saget relinquishes the Presidency; the Constituent Assembly elects Michel Domingue as President
1874		President Domingue promulgates the Constitution of 1874
1875		President Domingue signs a treaty of peace and friendship with the Dominican Republic
1876		President Domingue is overthrown; the Constituent Assembly elects Pierre Théoma Boisrond-Canal to a four-year term as President
1879		The Constituent Assembly elects Lysius Salomon as president; President Salomon would institute many reforms and pay off Haiti's remaining debt to France for independence
1880		The National Bank of Haiti (or Haitian Central Bank) is founded by President Salomon
1882		Port-au-Prince and Haiti are dedicated to Our Lady of Perpetual Help during a mass in Bel Air
1883		Haitian poet Oswald Durand composes his most famous work, "Choucoune"
1884		Haitian writer Louis-Joseph Janvier publishes the article "L'Egalité des Races", which proclaims the equality of the races
1885		Haitian writer Anténor Firmin publishes the book De l'Égalité des Races Humaines, which proclaims the equality of the races
1888		President Salomon is overthrown; the Constituent Assembly installs a provisional government
1888		The Constituent Assembly elects François Denys Légitime to the presidency
1889		President Légitime is overthrown; the Constituent Assembly installs a provisional government
1889		The Constituent Assembly elects Florvil Hyppolite to a seven-year term as president
1893		Haitian writer Hannibal Price publishes De la Réhabilitation de la Race Noire par la République d'Haïti ("On the Rehabilitation of the Black Race by the Republic of Haiti") in response to Spenser St. John's Hayti or the Black Republic
1896		President Hyppolite dies of a heart attack; Tirésias Simon Sam is elected to a seven-year term as president

== 20th century ==
Year	Date	Event
1902		President Simon Sam resigns; Pierre Nord Alexis becomes president
1904	1 January	Haiti celebrates 100 years of independence
1904		The Haitian Football Federation is created
1908		Pierre Nord Alexis withdraws from the presidency; the Constituent Assembly appoints François C. Antoine Simon president
1911		President Antoine Simon cedes the presidency to Cincinnatus Leconte
1912	5 August	The Haitian American Sugar Company is founded
1912	8 August	President Leconte and 300 soldiers are killed in an explosion at the National Palace; the Constituent Assembly appoints Tancrède Auguste president
1913		President Auguste dies during a visit to northern Haiti
1913		Senator Michel Oreste is elected president by the Constituent Assembly
1914		President Oreste is overthrown and succeeded by Oreste Zamor
1914		President Zamor is overthrown and lost by Joseph Davilmar Théodore
1915		President Théodore resigns and is succeeded by Vilbrun Guillaume Sam. Sam executed 167 political prisoners (including the previous president, Zamor) who were being held in the Port-au-Prince jail. President Sam sought refuge in the French Embassy. He was found by mulatto leaders, dragged out to the street, murdered and cut into small pieces. The parts were paraded throughout the capital.
1915	28 July	Three thousand United States Marines, led by Admiral William B. Caperton, enter Port-au-Prince; beginning of the 19-year United States occupation of Haiti
1915	12 August	Senator Philippe Sudré Dartiguenave is elected by the Constituent Assembly to a seven-year term as president
1919	12 April	The Haitian government undertakes a monetary reform with the National Bank of Haiti
1919	31 October	Charlemagne Péralte, leader of the resistance against U.S. occupation, is assassinated
1920		Haitian writer Leon Laleau publishes his first compilation of poems, A Voix Basse
1921	24 January	President Dartiguenave addresses United States President Warren G. Harding concerning the needs of the Haitian people
1921	12 April	United States President Harding responds to President Dartiguenave
1922	10 April	Louis Bornó is elected to a four-year term as president by the State Council
1922	15 May	President Dartiguenave's term ends; Louis Bornó is sworn into office
1922	28 December	The Central School of Agriculture (Ecole Centrale d'Agriculture) is founded in Damien
1926		President Bornó is re-elected by the State Council and makes a diplomatic trip to the United States
1926		Haitian writer Leon Laleau publishes his second compilation of poems, La Flèche au Cœur
1928		Haitian writer Jean Price-Mars publishes his acclaimed novel Ainsi Parla l'Oncle ("So spoke the Uncle")
1928		Leon Laleau publishes two more compilations of poems, Le Rayon des Jupes and Abréviations
1929	21 January	Haiti and the Dominican Republic sign an agreement settling the border between the two countries
1930	28 February	The Forbes Commission, sent by U.S. president Herbert Hoover to investigate Haiti's political situation, arrives in the country
1930	21 April	Louis Eugène Roy is designated temporary president by state decree
1930	18 November	Senator Sténio Vincent is elected to a six-year term as president
1930	10 December	Fietta, the first Apostolic Nuncio (diplomatic representative of the Roman Catholic Church) to Haiti, arrives in Port-au-Prince
1931		Jacques Roumain publishes his acclaimed novel Gouverneurs de la Rosée ("Masters of the Dew")
1931	5 August	The U.S. agrees to hand over control of the Offices of Public Works, Health, Agriculture and Education to the Haitian government
1931	15 December	The ceremony commemorating the fiftieth anniversary of the dedication of Port-au-Prince to the Virgin Mary, led by Archbishop Joseph Legouaze, began.
1931	17 December	The anniversary ceremony ended.
1933	7 August	The governments of Haiti and the United States sign an agreement on the withdrawal of U.S. troops from the country and the end of the U.S. occupation
1933	18 October	President Vincent of Haiti and President Rafael Leónidas Trujillo of the Dominican Republic meet for diplomatic talks in Ouanaminthe in northeastern Haiti, near the Dominican border
1934	5 July	President of the United States Franklin D. Roosevelt visits Cap-Haïtien
1934	14 August	Last American forces withdraw from Haiti, ending the U.S. occupation
1934	21 August	The flag of Haiti is raised at Casernes Dessalines, where it was lowered nineteen years earlier at the start of the U.S. occupation
1935	16 May	A new constitution is released, reinforcing the authority of the executive branch of government and renewing President Sténio Vincent's mandate for five more years
1937		Between 20,000 and 40,000 Haitians living in the Dominican Republic are massacred by the Dominican armed forces on the orders of President Rafael Trujillo.
1938	18 May	The 135th anniversary of the flag of Haiti is celebrated with athletic festivities at the Champs-de-Mars in Port-au-Prince
1940		Haiti's national library, the Bibliothèque Nationale d'Haïti is organized
1941	14 April	Élie Lescot is elected to a five-year term as president
1941	15 May	President Vincent's term ends; Élie Lescot takes office
1944	7 May	The Cathedral of Cap-Haïtien is consecrated after 100 years of restoration work
1944	14 May	The Centre d'Art is founded; it exhibits important Haitian art works
1946		A military coup forces President Lescot to resign; the newly created Executive Military Committee appoints Dumarsais Estimé president and the 8.1 M_{s} Dominican Republic earthquake.
1948	16 February	The government-owned tobacco company Régie du Tabac et des Allumettes is founded
1949	8 December	The bicentennial of Port-au-Prince's founding is celebrated; a World's Fair, the Exposition internationale du bicentenaire de Port-au-Prince, is held
1950	10 May	Dumarsais Estimé relinquishes the presidency and is replaced by a provisional government
1950	8 October	Presidential and legislative elections are held; Colonel Paul Magloire becomes the first president of Haiti to be elected directly by the people, the Delegates, and the Senators
1950	6 December	Paul Magloire is sworn in as president
1951		President Magloire of Haiti and President Trujillo of the Dominican Republic meet for diplomatic talks
1951		The Haitian Institute of Statistics (Institut Haïtien de Statistique) and the Haitian Institute of Farming and Industrial Credit (Institut Haïtien de Crédit Agricole et Industriel) are established by the government
1953	31 May	Father Rémy Augustin, the first native Haitian bishop, is consecrated at the Cathedral of Port-au-Prince
1954	1 January	A celebration commemorating the 150th anniversary of Haiti's independence from France, during which monuments to the "heroes of independence" are inaugurated in Port-au-Prince, began.
1954	4 January	The celebration ended.
1954	8 October	Hurricane Hazel kills an estimated 1,000 Haitians and decimates the coffee and cocoa crops, affecting the economy for years to come.
1955	26 January	President Magloire and his wife began a trip to the United States, Canada, and Jamaica.
1955	17 February	Magloire's trip ended.
1955	3 March	Vice-president of the United States Richard Nixon and his wife began a visit to Haiti.
1955	5 March	Nixon's trip ended.
1956		President Magloire relinquishes the presidency; President of the Supreme Court Joseph Nemours Pierre-Louis becomes provisional president of Haiti
1957		Franck Sylvain is elected President of Haiti, but is succeeded by a thirteen-member Executive Council of Government
1957		Daniel Fignolé is elected President of Haiti, but is replaced by a Military Council of Government
1957	22 October	Dr. François "Papa Doc" Duvalier is elected President of Haiti
1958		Duvalier began to attack his opponents violently, driving many of them into exile.
1964		Duvalier's reign of terror ended.
1964		The National Assembly votes to accept the Duvalieriste Constitution, establishing Duvalier as President for Life of Haiti ("Président à vie d'Haïti") and changes the flag along with coat of arms from blue and red to black and red, with the black had symbolized the ties to Africa
1968	28 October	François Wolf Ligondé, the first Haitian archbishop, is consecrated at the Cathedral of Port-au-Prince
1970		Thousands of Haitians began to flee poverty and repression in Haiti by boat, often arriving in south Florida.
1971	February	The National Assembly approves an amendment to the constitution, allowing President For Life Duvalier to name his son, Jean-Claude Duvalier, as his successor
1971	21 April	President for Life François Duvalier dies in Port-au-Prince
1971	22 April	Jean-Claude "Baby Doc" Duvalier succeeds his father as president for Life
1974		The Haiti national football team participates in the FIFA World Cup for the first time
1977	15 August	The U.S. ambassador to the United Nations commission arrives in Haiti; the commission meets with the Haitian government to discuss civil rights in Haiti
1980	27 May	President for Life Jean-Claude Duvalier marries Michèle Bennett
1983	March	Pope John Paul II arrives in Haiti, becoming the first Pope to visit the country
1983	27 August	The constitution is amended, creating the post of State Minister and allowing the President to name his successor
1985	6 June	President for Life Duvalier amends the constitution to allow the creation of the post of Prime Minister of Haiti
1985	July	A referendum is approved by 99.48% of voters, allowing political parties to participate in the government and recognizing the Presidency for Life of Jean-Claude Duvalier
1985	July	A constitutional amendment on the Presidency for Life is passed
1985	28 November	Three schoolboys (Jean-Robert Cius, Daniel Israël, and Mackenson Michel) are killed during an anti-government demonstration in Gonaïves
1986	31 January	Rumors spread through Port-au-Prince that President Duvalier has fled the country
1986	3 February	President Duvalier and members of his cabinet visit commercial and residential areas of Port-au-Prince as a show of power
1986	7 February	President Jean-Claude Duvalier flees Haiti for Talloires, France; the National Council of Government (Conseil National de Gouvernement, CNG) is established, led by General Henri Namphy; the Legislative Chamber and Duvalier's armed forces, Volontaire Sécurité Nationale, are dissolved
1986	25 February	The original blue and red flag of Haiti is raised at the National Palace, replacing the black and red flag of the Duvalier regime
1986	March	Former President of Haiti Daniel Fignolé returns to Haiti; a second version of the CNG is formed, consisting of Henri Namphy, Williams Régala, and Jacques François
1986	20 March	More than two thousand students and public transportation drivers of Carrefour demonstrate against the CNG
1986	26 April	Eight people are killed in an attack by armed groups on Fort-Dimanche
1986	19 October	Forty-one people are elected to a constituent assembly to draft a new constitution, the CNG appoints twenty more constituents for a total of sixty-one
1987	10 March	The constituent assembly presents the new constitution, written in both French and Haitian Creole, to President of the CNG Henri Namphy
1987	29 March	The new constitution is ratified by referendum; the results of 215 voting places show an approximately 99.81% approval rate
1987	13 May	The CNG publishes a decree electing the members of the Provisional Electoral Council (Conseil Electoral Provisoire, CEP)
1987	22 May	The CEP proclaims itself independent from the CNG
1987	5 June	The CEP delivers the text of the electoral law to the Minister of Justice
1987	July	Large landowners (grandons) massacre hundreds of peasants demanding land in Jean-Rabel
1987	17 July	During a ceremony at the Military Academy, the Armed Forces of Haiti swear allegiance to the new 1987 constitution
1987	29 November	At the Haitian presidential election, 1987 a massacre of voters takes place; the elections are suspended and General Namphy dissolves the CEP
1987	10 December	General Namphy sets 17 January 1988 as the new election date; the CNG elects a new Provisional Electoral Council (Conseil Electoral Provisoire, CEP)
1988	January	Christian Democrat Leslie Manigat is elected in military-run elections boycotted by the Haitian people and most candidates. In June he is overthrown in a military coup by Gen. Henri Namphy. In September, shortly after the St Jean Bosco massacre, Namphy is overthrown by Gen. Prosper Avril.
1990	January	President/General Prosper Avril declares a state of siege in January.
1990	March	Rising protests convince Avril to resign. A Provisional Government led by Supreme Court Justice Ertha Pascal-Trouillot is formed.
1990	16 December	Democratic elections take place. Father Jean-Bertrand Aristide, well known throughout the country for his support of the poor, is elected president with 67.5% of the counted popular vote. The "U.S. favorite" Marc Bazin finishes a distant second with 14.2% .
1991	January	A coup by former Tonton Macoutes head Roger Lafontant is foiled after tens of thousands pour into the streets of the capital, surrounding the National Palace.
1991	7 February	Aristide is sworn in as president.
1991	30 September	A military coup deposes Aristide, who goes into exile first in Venezuela, then in the United States.
1991		Thousands of Haitians begin to flee violence and repression in Haiti by boat. Although most are repatriated to Haiti by the U.S. government, many enter the United States as refugees.
1994	September	The de facto military government resigns at the request of the United States in September, which then sends in troops to occupy Haiti. This occupation is sanctioned by the United Nations.
1994	15 October	The U.S. returns Aristide as president.
1995		The U.S. nominally hands over military authority to the United Nations but maintains effective control of the occupation. Aristide dissolves the Haitian army.
1995	December	Former prime minister René Préval is elected president.
1996	7 February	Aristide leaves office and is succeeded by René Préval.
2000	May	Legislative, municipal and local elections are held. The OAS disputes how the sovereign electoral council calculates the run-offs for eight Senate seats.
2000	November	Aristide is reelected for a second five-year term with 92% of the vote in elections boycotted by the opposition. The last UN peacekeeping forces withdraw from Haiti.

== 21st century ==
Year	Date	Event
2001		Aristide succeeds Préval for a second five-year term. For the next two years, and with Washington's support, Aristide's opponents use the OAS challenge to the 2000 elections to increase economic and political instability. Former Haitian soldiers carry out guerrilla attacks, primarily along the Dominican border and in the capital.
2004		Haiti's 200th anniversary of independence.
2004	4 February	A revolt breaks out in the city of Gonaïves, with a local militia hostile to Aristide capturing the city and driving out the police force.
2004	22 February	Rebels capture Haiti's second-largest city, Cap-Haïtien, after just a few hours of fighting, claiming their biggest prize in a two-week uprising that has driven government forces from most of the country's north.
2004	29 February	Aristide resigns from office and flees Haiti aboard a U.S. military aircraft to South Africa. Boniface Alexandre is inaugurated as interim president. Aristide later claims that he was forced from office and kidnapped by the U.S. government.
2004	March	UN Resolution 1529 authorizes a three-month multinational interim peacekeeping force. It consists of troops from France, Canada, Chile and the U.S.
2004	September	Hurricane Jeanne kills over 1,900 people.
2006	February	René Préval is elected president, defeating U.S.-backed and other candidates in an election overseen by U.N. peacekeepers
2008	April	Riots break out in Les Cayes and Port-au-Prince over high food prices, forcing the ouster of Prime Minister Jacques Edouard Alexis.
2008	August	Tropical Storm Fay, Hurricane Gustav, Tropical Storm Hanna and Hurricane Ike strike within a month, leaving nearly 800 people dead and wiping out a quarter of the economy. (to September)
2008	November	The Pétion-Ville school collapse and the Grace Divine School collapse.
2009	May	Former U.S. President Bill Clinton is appointed U.N. special envoy to Haiti. He is tasked with reinvigorating the country's moribund economy after the 2008 storms.
2010	12 January	A major earthquake, 7.0 on the moment magnitude scale, kills over 230,000 and causes massive damage to buildings and infrastructure in Port-au-Prince.
2010	Fall	A UN Peacekeeping Mission caused a cholera outbreak that killed thousands of people and continues to sicken people across the country.
2016	4 October	Hurricane Matthew makes landfall on the peninsula of the nation as a category 4, killing over 700 (although estimates place the toll at ~1,600) and causing massive damage in its wake
2021	14 August	2021 Haiti earthquake causes widespread damage as of 15 August 2021, 304 people are reported dead and another 1.800 injured.

== See also ==
- Timeline of Port-au-Prince history
