= Gwen Grant Mellon =

American medical missionary (1911–2000)

- Born: July 22, 1911; Englewood, New Jersey, US
- Died: November 29, 2000 (aged 89); Miami, Florida
- Education: B.S. sociology, Smith College, 1934
- Occupation: Medical administrator
- Years active: 1956–2000
- Known for: Founder of Hôpital Albert Schweitzer Haiti
- Relatives: William Larimer Mellon Jr., husband
- Medical career
- Institutions: Hôpital Albert Schweitzer Haiti

Gwen Grant Mellon (July 22, 1911 – November 29, 2000) was an American medical missionary and the founder and administrator of Hôpital Albert Schweitzer Haiti in Deschapelles, Haiti. As a single mother she worked as a riding instructor on a dude ranch in Arizona, where she met neighboring rancher William Larimer Mellon Jr., heir to the Mellon fortune. Shortly after their marriage in 1946, the couple decided to emulate the work of Dr. Albert Schweitzer in an underdeveloped country and enrolled at Tulane University, he to receive his medical degree and she to study tropical medicine. She planned the building of the 75-bed hospital in Haiti, paid for from the couple's personal fortune, and worked there from its opening in 1956 until her death. She was honored with the first Elizabeth Blackwell Award in 1958 and the Albert Schweitzer Prize for Humanitarianism in 2000.

== Life ==
Gwendolyn Grant was born on July 22, 1911, in Englewood, New Jersey, to William Wright Grant, a construction engineer, and Katherine Hall, a former New York debutante. She grew up in Geneva, New York. She was a graduate of the Shipley School in Bryn Mawr, Pennsylvania, and in 1934 received her bachelor's degree in sociology from Smith College.

With her first husband, John de Groot Rawson, she had four children, one of whom died. In 1942, she moved with her three young children to Arizona in order to establish residency to obtain a divorce. She worked as a riding instructor on a dude ranch. There she met neighboring cattle rancher William Larimer Mellon Jr., an heir to the Mellon fortune, whom she married in 1946. Inspired by a 1947 article about the work of Albert Schweitzer, who had set aside an illustrious career to found a hospital in West Africa, he told her, "I think I'll become a doctor and practice in the underdeveloped world", to which she replied, "You're right, we don't want to sit around looking at the damn cows all our lives".

The couple enrolled at Tulane University, where he earned his medical degree in 1953 and she studied tropical medicine and hospital administration. The couple chose to build a hospital in an impoverished location in Deschapelles, Haiti, where 185,000 people were serviced by two government health clinics. Building costs were covered by a foundation that she and her husband established from their private fortune. The 75-bed Hôpital Albert Schweitzer Haiti cost $2 million and opened in 1956.

Gwen Grant Mellon spoke Haitian Creole, worked as a nurse, admitted patients, and kept patient records. She taught sanitation, oversaw digging of water wells, and set up literacy classes. After her husband's death in 1989, she became the hospital's operating head and continued to work there until her death. By 2000, the hospital was servicing 400 outpatients per day and 2,500 patients per year.

Per her request and in keeping with the tradition of burying the poor in Haiti, she was buried in a cardboard box. Both she and Mellon are buried on the grounds of the hospital they founded.

== Awards and honors ==
On September 27, 1958, she received the first Elizabeth Blackwell Award at the 50th anniversary convocation of William Smith College. In 2000, she received the Albert Schweitzer Prize for Humanitarianism.

== Works ==
- My Road to Deschapelles. Hôpital Albert Schweitzer. 1997. ISBN 9780826410559.
- Letters From St. Marc. 1995. ASIN B007OVTHD4.
