= History of Haitian nationality and citizenship =

The Republic of Haiti is located on western portion of the island Hispaniola in the Caribbean. Haiti declared its independence from France in the aftermath of the first successful slave revolution in the Americas in 1804, and their identification as conquerors of a racially repressed society is a theme echoed throughout Haiti's history.

== Nationality prior to 1803 ==
Haiti has a unique history of racial ideology. During its colonial period, class structure shifted from one based on wealth, to divisions distinguished by race. Once accepted as elite, families of African descent were rejected because of racist stereotypes. This regression shaped the evolution of the Haitian Revolution as peoples of African descent rose up against the white colonial planters. Haitians are primarily of African descent but a significant number of Haitians are also descended from the indigenous Taino (Arawak native Indians) who inhabited the island prior to Christopher Columbus's arrival. The Taino were nearly wiped out due to diseases that the Europeans brought with them and because of cruel practices, including slavery. The Tainos fled to the mountains just before the Africans arrived on the island. Mixing between the remaining Tainos and some of the Africans occurred and it is believed that many Haitians in present-day have some ancestral links to the indigenous Tainos.

=== Nationality in Saint-Domingue before 1763 ===
As part of the French Empire, nationality in Saint-Domingue, now the Republic of Haiti, was based on a mixture of economics and race, combining white planter elite, black slaves, and free black planters. Haiti was unusual, as it was the only slave society in the Americas with a significant population of free black planters. Unlike most colonial slave societies, status was based on economics rather than race, creating a unified master class of both races. "Whereas the freedmen in all other slave societies entered at the lowest ranks of free society, in the French West Indies they were often permitted to enter the class of plantation owners from the beginning." Officially, imperial policy and the inequality of slavery's distribution of freedom and wealth excluded all blacks from the civil, public sphere of society. However, those with little or no official power were able to use public law to fight for their security in liberty and justice. For example, many slaves were able to use the French Code Noir marriage provision and claim independence. There was no fine line between the races as interracial relationships were not uncommon; colonists often had sexual relations with their slaves, generally recognizing the paternity of their children and freeing them from slavery. Men and women who escaped slavery were able to assert themselves in civil society; the opportunity to advance economically was not reserved for white Europeans.

=== Code Noir ===
Also known as "The Black Code", this set of laws was written in 1685 concerning the governance of the French American Islands. It determined and regulated the status of different social classes. King Louis XIV composed these laws to assert French presence in his Caribbean territories, and to assert Christianity and control over the free black population. Its purpose was to regulate hours of work and food distribution, limitations of punishments, and formally limit slave-owners' otherwise arbitrary power. The Code expelled all Jews, forced all slaves to be baptized, and made provisions concerning the citizenship status of freed blacks. According to Article 59, emancipated blacks were to be granted the same privileges as native-born French subjects.

Article LIX.
We grant to manumitted slaves the same rights, privileges and liberties enjoyed by persons born free; desiring that they merit this acquired liberty and that it produce in them, both for their persons and for their property, the same effects that the good fortune of natural liberty causes in our other subjects.

Yet freed blacks generally suffered worse conditions than those enslaved. All blacks were considered public property, so although they were not tied to a single master, all blacks suffered under racial laws.

- for three years all had to serve in the "maréchaussee" militia to catch fugitive slaves
- had to serve in the general militia
- obliged to a corvée to maintain the roadways
- could not be employed publicly or in a liberal profession (for example, schoolteachers)
- those of mixed races could not use the name of their white parent

The Code provided that freed persons were naturalized and contained provisions for manumission and emancipation of slaves. Though it did not prohibit the marriage of blacks and whites, it carried substantial fines for owners who produced illegitimate children with slaves, decreeing that the father had to give the child to a hospital as a slave who was ineligible for future emancipation, unless he married his slave woman in a church, automatically manumitting her and the children through the marriage. Children followed the status of the mother, regardless of the father's status, thus if she was a slave her children were slaves and if she was free her children were free.

=== Nationality after the Seven Year War ===
When the Seven Years' War ended in 1763, a shift in French colonists' self-identity due to the ensuing political conflicts redefined a line between the races. In an effort to reaffirm their French identity politically and culturally, white colonists defined their bond with the metropole through race. Colonists and imperial administrators created a new public sphere in by which people were unfit for civil life based on their constructed racial sexual stereotypes; those that were unfit were not allowed to practice their citizenship rights. Resentful of black success, the colonial elite segregated themselves from their counterparts, the wealthy Creole and ex-slave families, by using race instead of wealth to classify their high level of society. For example, everyone, regardless of wealth, who had one African grandparent had to identify themselves as "quarteron," a person of color. Colonial administration used racism as a tool in developing a Saint-Domingue identity. The French law of colonial citizenship being fully "white" was influenced by the enlightenment's emphasis on the purity of 'whiteness". The French Constitution of 1791 specifically left out French territories:

The French colonies and possessions in Asia, Africa, and America, although they form part of the French dominion, are not in the present constitution.

By excluding Haiti in this Constitution, which contained the Declaration of the Rights of Man, Haiti was denied the same rights as other French subjects. As a new definition French Citizenship was developing with the progression of the French Revolution, elite men of color began to fight for their rights as citizens.

=== Haitian Revolution ===
The development of Haitian nationality is marked by its declaration of independence on January 1, 1804. The Caribbean island won its independence from France after a period of harsh colonial rule in the first successful slave rebellion, making Haiti the first independent country in America. As ideas of the French Revolution spread, a movement against the oppressive Black Code developed.

==== The Free Colored narrative ====
In the first century after independence, descendants of the wealthy black planter elite ruled Haiti. These "mulatrist" historians supported a narrative of the Haitian Revolution that focused on the free colored revolutionaries. As their ancestors had been leaders of the revolution, it followed naturally that the superior elite planters of mixed race should lead the new Haiti. "Mulatrists" went so far as to claim they could not be guilty of racism towards the darker skinned constituency because they had suffered under French racism.

In 1788, the Society of the Friends of the Blacks, an abolitionist group, formed in Paris to reform the harsh racial laws in Saint-Domingue. With support from wealthy free black planters such as Julien Raimond, the Society of the Friends of the Blacks took the issue to trial. Instead of outright arguing against the slave trade, Raimond and the Society campaigned for the recognition of citizenship for mixed-race colonists. In 1791, the same Paris legislation who voted on the Declaration of the Rights of Man and of the Citizen ruled in favor of the society, granting voting rights to free blacks, albeit limited voting rights. Unable to tolerate this decision as it would destabilize the slave regime, white colonialists reacted in violence, only to start a civil war with the free and enslaved black people of Haiti. It was this "mulatto" oligarchy that led Haitians through their Revolution from France.

==== The "Black" Revolutionary narrative ====
By the twentieth century, this view had shifted to focus on the slave rebellion and its ex-slave leaders like Louverture and Dessalines. This "black" Revolutionary narrative served to promote Haitian national identity, focusing on the strength of a colonial repressed society rather than its leaders. Haiti even adopted a new national anthem, "La Dessalinienne", promoting the culture of the rural majority.

When England and Spain invaded in 1793, they were defeated by ex-slave Toussaint Louverture, leader of the French and native army. As the white and black populations mobilized against one another, Louverture led the oppressed slaves in the Haitian Revolution, naming himself Governor-General for Life in the 1801 Constitution. Fighting between blacks and whites would continue, as Napoleon sent General Charles Lecerc to arrest Louverture and re-instate slavery. In 1803, another rebellion against the French colonists was led by Jean-Jacques Dessalines. The successful rebellion ended the civil war in 1804 with the Declaration of Haitian Independence and Dessalines was proclaimed Emperor of Haiti in 1804.

== Foreign recognition of Haiti as a nation ==
Recognizing Haiti as a nation was difficult for those countries that did not want to be associated with a free slave society. In dealing with foreign policy, Haiti wanted to be seen as an equal nation. Haiti granted automatic citizenship to anyone of African or Amerindian origin, and even went so far as to invite these oppressed peoples to settle in Haiti. Their fight to be recognized reflects the Haitian desire to be equal, and thus free.

=== France ===
France recognized Haitian independence in 1825. This recognition was indirect, "masked by a degree of doublespeak that would have made Talleyrand proud", and only transpired after a Haiti paid huge reparations. However, Haiti was able to open normal relations with their former colonizers.

=== United States ===
Prior to the Haitian Revolution, Haiti had been the United States' second largest trading partner, second only to Great Britain. However, in the early nineteenth century America was very much a slave society, and balked at the idea of supporting a slave revolt that took over a nation. The United States was divided; merchants wanted to continue trade while southern slave owners wanted to isolate or even repress the new Haitians. Until Jean-Pierre Boyer unified Haiti in 1820, commercial relations were limited. As the American Civil War progressed and the United States' stance on black liberation began to shift, so did their views of Haiti and Liberia (another free black country). As an imperialistic nation, the US had trouble with a nation that granted civil status to whom they deemed unworthy; while they had slavery, the US could not recognize Haiti.

If any good reason exists why we should persevere longer in withholding our recognition of the sovereignty and independence of Haiti and Liberia, I am unable to discern it...It does not admit of doubt that important commercial advantages may be obtained by treaties with them.

— Abraham Lincoln to Congress, December 3, 1861,

In 1863, Abraham Lincoln officially recognized Haiti and Liberia as independent and sovereign, and signed a treaty of amity and commerce in 1865. The subsequent black Haitian ambassador in Washington, D.C. was recognized as an equal in American politics.

== Enfranchisement of Haitian peoples through law ==
=== History of the legal system ===
Prior to Haitian independence, Saint-Domingue was a colony under French rule, but laws were made specifically for Saint-Domingue as a colony. For example:

- The Constitution of 1765 separated the military from the civil government
- The Edict of August 1765 established a judicial system

However, after the 1789 Revolution, all developments in French law also pertained to Saint-Domingue as a colony came under a more direct empirical ruling. The important developments of this time period are:

- The decree of April 4, 1792, which granted political equality to emancipated slaves
- The decree of February 4, 1794, which abolished slavery

==== Constitutions of 1801 and 1805 ====
Louverture's 1801 Constitution freed all slaves, but required their presence on the island as workers. It addressed succession and marriage without detailing nationality requirements, though it banned slavery and included all inhabitants of Hispaniola. Dessaline's 1805 constitution held racial laws: Haitians (all considered black) could not marry white foreigners. The 1805 Constitution was the first Constitution of the Empire of Haiti and though it had no explicit definitions of nationals, emigration was punishable by death and naturalization in a foreign country was subject to "corporal or disgrace punishments".

==== Constitution of 1806 ====
This ended the authoritative regime of Dessalines, creating three separate branches of government. This changed the relationship between the citizen and the state, empowering the citizen. However, the legislative branch represented by the Senate remained the most powerful. Like its predecessor, it had no finite scheme of nationality.

==== Constitution of 1816 ====
Lasting until 1843, this constitution leveled the power of the three branches and brought in civil ideas from the French declaration in 1789 of fundamental rights. It defined Haitians in Article 44 as all Africans, indigenous people, and their children born in the colonies or abroad who resided in Haiti. Article 39 prohibited any white person, except those who served in the military or performed civil service, or was admitted to the territory prior to 27 December 1806 from being Haitians.

==== Haitian Civil Code of 1825 ====
During the period from 1820 to 1849, which from 1822 included the territory of Hispaniola now known as the Dominican Republic, the Republic of Haiti replaced the Empire of Haiti. The republic was granted independence from France in 1825, subject to paying reparations. That year the government adopted a Civil Code, which was based on the French Napoleonic Code, but had significant differences. In the Haitian version, only people with African or indigenous blood could be naturalized. It conferred nationality upon anyone born in Haiti, regardless of legitimacy, or born abroad to a Haitian. Foreigners were prohibited from owning property in Haiti, except moveable assets, thus if a foreigner inherited property, they had to pay its value to the heirs. Haitian wives who married foreigners were required to sell any real property that they owned, if by marriage they acquired the nationality of their husband.

When Rivière-Hérard unified Haiti, he abolished the law criminalizing Haitian and white foreign marriage. Two years later the Code of Civil Procedure, the Rural Code, and the Commercial Code were established; these are the foundations of Haiti's legal system today.

==== Constitution of 1843 and laws impacting women's nationality ====
In 1843, a new constitution was written, which for the first time had explicit rules as to whether women married to foreigners kept their Haitian nationality. Haitian women married to foreigners were denationalized and dispossessed of their property, though the children of such unions were considered to be Haitians. Seeking to repeal the 1843 provisions and legalize relationships between foreign men and Haitian women, a law was passed on 30 October 1860 stating that marriage did not alter a woman's nationality, but it still provided that foreign husbands had to sell any property they might have inherited.

The 1874 Constitution stated in Article 6 that a Haitian woman married to a foreigner acquired the nationality of her husband and the Constitution of 1879 allowed her to retain any property she had owned prior to losing her nationality through marriage. She was forbidden to obtain any property after the marriage in Haiti. Because of confusion about the provision, Article 5 was modified by the legislature on 10 October 1884, clarifying that a Haitian woman who married a foreigner automatically lost her Haitian nationality and could repatriate only upon the death of her spouse and following the procedures for naturalization. She could not own property in Haiti under any circumstances. For foreign women who married Haitian men, the article provided that they automatically derived the nationality of the spouse. These provisions were carried through to the 1889 revision to the constitution, which also stipulated that Haitian birthright nationality was granted to children born anywhere to a Haitian father; to children born anywhere to a Haitian mother, only if they were not legally recognized by their father; or to children born in the territory to foreigners if they were descended of Africans.

The Haitian Nationality Law of 1907 provided that legitimate, legitimized or illegitimate children legally recognized by a Haitian father, were birthright nationals. Only an illegitimate child of a Haitian mother, who had not been legally recognized by the father, had Haitian nationality. Children of unknown parentage born in Haiti were recognized as birthright nationals, as long as the parents did not recognize them before their majority. If a child was of African descent and born to foreigners in Haiti it was recognized as having Haitian nationality if it was legitimate or legally recognized by the father, or illegitimate and unrecognized by the father. A child born in Haiti to foreigners who were not of African descent could claim birthright nationality by declaring in the year of reaching majority the desire to have Haitian nationality and renouncing any foreign nationality. Naturalization or relinquishment of nationality by a Haitian father did not automatically affect his children. Women had no ability to change the nationality of their children while married.

The 1907 Law required that married women who married foreigners automatically lost their Haitian nationality, even in the event that they did not acquire the nationality of their husband and became stateless. It provided that foreign women who married Haitian men derived their nationality from their husband. To regain nationality lost by marriage, a Haitian woman had to apply for naturalization as if she were a foreigner, if her marriage existed. Upon termination of the marriage, she could repatriate by denouncing her foreign nationality and declaring her intent before the proper authorities. A foreign woman who had obtained Haitian nationality upon marriage could renounce it upon termination of the marriage by acquiring another nationality. The wife of a foreign man who naturalized as Haitian automatically derived his new nationality. The wife of a naturalized Haitian was unable to independently change her nationality.

In 1933, Justin Barau and Francis Salgado, Haitian delegates to the Pan-American Union's Montevideo conference, signed the Inter-American Convention on the Nationality of Women, which became effective in 1934, without legal reservations. The Nationality Law of 1907 remained effective until it was amended in 1942. After the amendment, Article 9 no longer required married women to lose their nationality and allowed them to repatriate. The new process did not require them to naturalize as a foreigner, allowing them to simply make a declaration in the prosecutor's office of the place of residence stating her desire to retrieve Haitian nationality. The Constitutions of 1964 and 1971 granted derivative nationality by choice to foreign women marrying Haitian men, but required that the marriage certificate renounce any other nationality. Haitian women were unable to pass on nationality to children legally recognized by their fathers until passage of the Nationality Law of 6 November 1984. Between 1984 and the passage of the 1987 Constitution, children born abroad to Haitian parents were considered foreigners unless both parents were Haitians.

==== Constitution of 1918 ====
Adopted during US occupation, this Constitution focused on property rights of foreigners. Previously, to ensure against foreign white domination, no white foreigner was permitted to own real estate. Contrastingly, all black foreigners could easily acquire Haitian nationality. In 1918, foreigners, regardless of race, could own land for business or residency purposes, losing those rights five years after that purpose ended.

==== Constitution of 1950 ====
Article 88 gave power directly to the citizen constituency, as the President of the Republic would now be directly voted upon by citizens.

=== Duvalierist constitution of 1983 ===
==== Citizenship media ====
The follow is found in Article 21: Citizenship.

===== Duvalierist descent =====
- born in Haiti to a Haitian mother or father
- born in a foreign country to Haitian parents
- born in Haiti to a foreign father; if not recognized by father, it is acceptable to be recognized by a foreign mother only if the subject is of black descent

===== Duvalierist naturalization =====
- after five years of residency, one may apply for naturalization, yet may not practice political rights until ten years after the date of naturalization. these political rights include:
  - right to participate in the election of the President of the Republic
  - right to defend and serve the country
  - right to be elected or appointed to public office

Note: citizens over the age of 18 are entitled to civil and political rights; not all Haitians are citizens.

==== Article 22: Democratic Principles ====
This article is concerned with the principle of equality for all Haitians, including but not limited to freedom of speech (except during wartime), worship and peaceful assembly (excluding public assembly which must be authorized); with an overall umbrella of individual freedoms guaranteed by the state (for example, extradition for political reasons is prohibited).

== Haitian society ==
Haitian society has been sharply divided since its independence in 1804. The rural agricultural sector, composing as much as 95% of the population, makes up the base of this society. The elite are then left to dominate national institutions and the governmental apparatus. These two sections are kept separate by income, source of income, language, education, religion, etc. Militarism and republican nationalism formed the basis by which Haitian society was aligned, granting the elite class legitimate power.

=== Yeomanry ===
They live in rural areas, are poor, and work the land for a living. They believe in Vodou so practice common law marriage, sometimes even polygamy, and generally speak only Creole. Isolated from the outside world, these poor farmers are illiterate and uneducated. Most noticeably, they are (for the most part) darker in skin tone than the elite.

=== Middle class ===
The Haitian middle class is better off financially than the yeomanry and own their own businesses and attend private educational institutions and are more literate than the yeomanry.

=== Elite ===
This merchant and professional class dominates urban society. They speak French as well as Creole (the national language) and are sent to institutions of higher learning abroad. Catholicism is the principal religion, so most marriages are religiously affiliated, thus "western" and "modern". This elite, some dark skinned but most being lighter-skinned, view themselves as aristocracy.

== United States occupation ==
Until 1915, Haiti followed an isolationist policy. However, in 1915 the United States invaded Haiti and kept occupation until 1934. During this time, interest in Haitian nationality broadened to embrace the rural majority's "black" culture. A Haitian historical society was founded in 1924, with a focus on their history through the "Black Slave Rebellion" narrative of the Haitian Revolution. Louverture and Dessalines became "great slave revolutionaries", showing the world the power of colonized peoples.

"By the 1970s…had begun to think of their homeland in terms that transcended mere nostalgic attachment to a particular outpost of empire. The new… nationalism precipitates strong tensions between conservative and radical elements within local intelligentsias. Here too, the Haitian experience of the early 1900s, with its armed conflict…Finally, the accelerated urbanization and migration experienced in Haiti, which resulted from the centralizing tendencies of the state, import-dependency, and the extreme exploitation of labor, …trends in the global economy created the impetus for a massive population exodus after World War II."

Since the US occupation, Haiti has been unable to establish an independent civilian police force as an entity separate from the army. Every attempt to do so has resulted in a military overthrow of the presidency.

Haitian Civil-Military Relations:

- Military control for the protection of the state against foreign invaders
- Military control for the management of a crisis
- Civilian control through the demilitarization of the nation
- Civilian control through the professionalization of the army
- Civilian control through the co-optation of the arm
- Civilian control through the democratization of the army

== Present-day citizenship ==
All citizenship laws in effect today are from the Constitution of Haiti ratified in 1987.

=== Haitian citizenship media ===
==== Standing descent ====
A child, regardless of where they are born, is considered Haitian if both parents are native-born citizen of Haiti.

==== Standing naturalization ====
Naturalization is possible, yet can only be obtained after a continuous period of Haitian residence for five years. A naturalized citizen has the right to vote, but is not eligible to hold public office until five years after their date of naturalization, excluding those offices reserved for native-born Haitians by Constitutional law.

=== Dual citizenship ===
In recent years, there has been discussion about a constitutional amendment to change Haiti's stance against dual nationality; yet while feelings have begun to lean towards acceptance of dual citizenship, policy has yet to change. Legally, the 1987 constitution still stands, which states, "Dual Haitian and foreign nationality is in no case permitted." The constitution also automatically negates Haitian citizenship with the acquisition of foreign citizenship, which strongly affects today's Haitian diaspora. However, there is an exception. A child with Haitian parents born outside of Haiti may dually acquire the citizenship of their birth country. At the age of 18, the child must renounce one of their nationalities.

Haiti's national gazette, Le Moniteur, indicates that dual citizenship was legalized in Haiti in June 2012, when the 1987 constitution was amended to remove the prohibition against the holding of foreign citizenship by Haitians (19 June 2012, 7). Prior to this amendment, conditions for losing citizenship included naturalization in another country or working in a political position in the service of a foreign government (Haiti 1987, Art. 13). The constitutional amendments were originally approved by legislators in May 2011 and some media sources suggested at the time that dual citizenship had been immediately legalized (TVA nouvelles 9 May 2011; Haiti libre 9 May 2011). However, the amendments did not become law until they were published in the national gazette on 19 June 2012 (JURIST 20 June 2012; The Huffington Post 19 June 2012).

=== Grounds for withdrawing Haitian citizenship ===
Article 13 of the 1987 constitution explains how Haitian citizenship can be lost.

- Acquiring citizenship of a foreign country through naturalization
- Serving a foreign government in office
- If not a native Haitian but naturalized, residing abroad for three years without authorization. This loss is permanent

Voluntarily withdrawing citizenship must take place before the Justice Department, Port-au-Prince, in Haiti. It is not possible to reclaim citizenship lost involuntarily.

== Haitian diaspora ==
Transnationalism defies the common view of a state's populations remaining within its territorial boundaries. Similarly, cultural nationality is determined by a shared language, culture, believed ethnicity, etc., transcending mere residence of a geographic locality. The growth of transnationalism with the development of globalization has re-framed, not destroyed, the state; institutional practices and national identities are changing to adapt to the globalization of their people. Since the 1950s, there has been an increase in Haitian migration to places such as the United States to escape the political and economic repression of the Duvalier presidencies under François Duvalier, "Papa Doc," (1957–71) and Jean-Claude Duvalier, "Baby Doc," (1971–86). This migration phenomenon known as "the Haitian Diaspora" has developed to describe the thousands of Haitian nationals living outside of their territory. Generally losing their Haitian citizenship, these long distance nationals have come to act like "transborder citizens," members to some degree of both states. There are legal, political, and social repercussions to this "transnationalism." Dual citizenship is out of the question; Haitians living in a foreign country cannot get involved lest their "Haitianism" is questioned, yet by remaining faithful to their homeland, they cannot fully enjoy the citizenry benefits of the country of their sojourn.

Haitian Americans have different status positions in American society based on their citizenship status: refugee, student (student visa), citizen, immigrant, visitor, and the undocumented person. These legal statuses have their own boundaries, but are not subject to influence by income or race status.

=== Diaspora citizenship ===
Citizenship practices by Haitian immigrants in the Diaspora:

- those processes linking the Diaspora to the homeland are transnational in that they move beyond the boundaries of the nation-state
- individual migrants hold membership in more than one country and continue to be active in homeland affairs
- the 'politics of simultaneity,’ in which citizens participate in the affairs of two or more countries at the same time, replaces the 'politics of secession' prevalent in the dual citizenship context
- these individuals claim or appropriate civil, political, social, and cultural rights in both countries
- they develop bi-polar or multiple identities that reflect the border-crossing process they experience in their everyday life."

=== Immigration and citizenship institutions ===
Although these institutions may have good intentions, the political and financial instability of Haiti have restricted the potential effectiveness these programs are designed to have abroad.

- The Office of Diasporic Affairs: created in 1980 under Henry Namphy; moved to Office of President in 1991 under Jean-Bertrand Aristide
- 10th Department Organization: elected a central committee to oversee regional Committees in cities with large Haitian immigration populations; independent yet strongly tied to Aristide's government
- Ministry for Haitians Living Abroad: established in 1994 with Aristides return to regulate the relationship between Haitians living abroad and the state

The Ministry for Haitian Communities Abroad created a database in 2000 recording the technical skills of those Haitians residing abroad. The idea is that Haitians' loyalty and sense of belonging to the state – even as emigrants – will impel them to contribute to Haiti's national development. The emigration of these potentially productive citizens emphasized Haiti's ambivalent attitude toward the diaspora. However, money from Haitians living abroad can be hugely beneficial; in the 1990s, Haitian remittances were equal to 39 percent of Haiti's national budget.

Dual citizenship was legalized in Haiti in June 2012, when the 1987 constitution was amended to remove the prohibition against the holding of foreign citizenship by Haitians.

=== Noteworthy cases ===
Lionel Jean-Baptiste, a Haitian immigrant, was stripped of his U.S. citizenship and then denied entrance to Haiti, his homeland. After being held in a detention center for a drug-related crime in 2006, the U.S. Supreme Court ruled that foreigners who could not be deported could not be held indefinitely, forcing the release of Baptiste. Baptiste was not issued a Haitian passport because by becoming a naturalized American, he had renounced his Haitian citizenship and thus was no longer considered Haitian.

== See also ==
- History of Haiti
- Timeline of Haitian history
