= William Larimer Mellon =

William Larimer Mellon may refer to:

- William Larimer Mellon Sr. (1868–1949), American businessman and founder of Gulf Oil
- William Larimer Mellon Jr. (1910–1989), American philanthropist and physician
