= Louima =

Louima is a Haitian surname. Notable people with the surname include:

- Abner Louima (born 1966), Haitian American police brutality victim
- Bendson Louima (born 1979), Haitian physician
- Roberto Louima (born 1997), Haitian footballer
