= Bendson Louima =

Haitian physician (born 1979)

Dr. Bendson Louima (born 1979) is a Haitian physician. He is the only medical doctor in the rural community of Caracol in Haiti. He is the founder of Médecins Sans Frontières Suisse Cap-Haïtien (i.e. Doctors Without Borders Switzerland Cap-Haitïen), an entity for the treatment of cholera in Haiti. He sits on the Board of Advisors of Emedex International, an organization whose mission is to build sustainable change in emergency healthcare globally.

== Background and training ==
Dr. Louima was born in Port-de-Paix, Haiti on February 5, 1979. He attended medical school at Université Notre Dame d'Haïti from 2002 to 2008 and was an intern at Hôpital Universitaire Justinien, Cap-Haïtien from 2008 to 2009. Dr. Louima then completed one year of social service in Caracol in the northeastern region of Haiti. He is also involved with pediatric diseases at the Hôpital Saint-François de Sales, Port-au-Prince, training in obstetrics and gynecology at the Centre Hospitalier Universitaire Brugmann in Brussels, Belgium, and with HIV-AIDS at the University of Miami and at the Hôpital Universitaire Justinien.

== Medical work and teaching ==
He is the medical director of the Centre de Santé Sainte-Elizabeth in Caracol and also founded Médecins Sans Frontières - Suisse-Cap-Haitïen for the treatment of cholera in Haiti. In addition, Dr. Louima teaches First Aid, anatomy and small surgery classes at a school for nurses’ aids. In 2012, Dr. Louima visited the University of Georgia School of Social Work to talk to the students of two doctors who had met him as volunteers of a clinic in Terrier-Rouge, Haiti.
