= Timeline of Port-au-Prince =

The following is a timeline of the history of the city of Port-au-Prince, Haiti.

== Prior to 19th century ==
- 1749 – Port-au-Prince designated capital of French Saint-Domingue.
- 1751 – 21 November: 1751 Port-au-Prince earthquake.
- 1770 – 3 June: 1770 Port-au-Prince earthquake.
- 1778 – Foundation of the theatre Comédie de Port-au-Prince.
- 1783 – Freemasons lodge established.
- 1791 - Haitian Revolution
- 1793
  - Siege of Port-au-Prince (1793)
  - 23 September: Town renamed "Port-Républicain".
- 1794 - Battle of Port-Républicain
- 1797 – Bertrand Littledale & Co. established.
- 1798 – May: British forces withdraw.

== 19th century ==
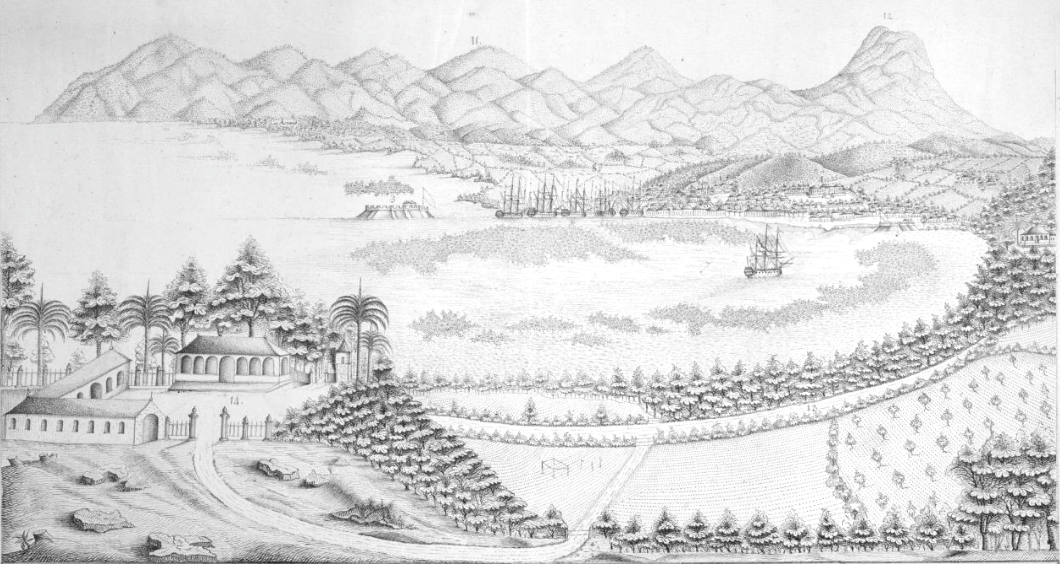
Port-au-Prince, ca.1800

- 1803 – Siege of Port-au-Prince (1803)
- 1804 – Haitian Declaration of Independence
- 1806 – 17 October: Jean-Jacques Dessalines assassinated near town.
- 1822 – December: Fire.
- 1823 – Academy of Haiti opens.
- 1830 – Population: 26,000 (approximate).
- 1834 - Port-au-Prince Cosmorama held.
- 1843 – Wesleyan primary school opens.
- 1845 – Le Moniteur Haïtien newspaper begins publication.
- 1848 – April: Massacre of mulattos by order of President Faustin Soulouque.
- 1852 – 18 April: Coronation of Faustin Soulouque as Emperor of Haiti.
- 1859 – La République newspaper begins publication.
- 1860
  - Le Progrès newspaper begins publication.
  - Naval school established.
- 1864 – Place Geffard (park) inaugurated.
- 1872 - Port international de Port-au-Prince in operation.
- 1881
  - National Bank of Haiti established.
  - National Palace (Haiti) rebuilt.
- 1885 - Population: (estimated) 20,000.
- 1890 – Institution Saint-Louis de Gonzague (school) founded.
- 1891 – Marché en Fer established.
- 1894 – L'Écho d'Haïti newspaper begins publication.
- 1898 – Le Nouvelliste newspaper begins publication.
- 1900 – Société Agricole et Industrielle de Port-au-Prince established.

== 20th century ==
- 1907 – Le Matin newspaper begins publication.
- 1908 – Sténio Vincent becomes mayor.
- 1910 - Population: 61,000.(estimate).
- 1915 – 28 July: United States occupation of Haiti begins.
- 1918 – Violette Athletic Club (football club) formed.
- 1919
  - Union School Haiti founded.
  - Battle of Port-au-Prince (1919)
- 1920
  - Population: 120,000 (approximate).
  - Battle of Port-au-Prince (1920)
- 1923 – Racing Club Haïtien (football club) formed.
- 1925 – La Novelle Ronde literary group formed.
- 1926 – Radio station begins broadcasting.
- 1928 – Cathedral of Our Lady of the Assumption, Port-au-Prince dedicated.
- 1929
  - Bowen airfield in operation.
  - Concrete wharf constructed.
- 1930 – Cercle Bellevue Club reopens (approximate date).
- 1932 – Le Peuple newspaper begins publication.
- 1934 – Paramount Cine opens.
- 1935
  - Rex Theatre opens.
  - Hotel Oloffson in business.
- 1940 – National Library of Haiti headquartered in city.
- 1942 – University of Haiti established.
- 1943 – Jazz des Jeunes dance orchestra formed.
- 1944 – Centre d'Art opens.
- 1945 – Institut Français established.
- 1949 – Exposition internationale du bicentenaire de Port-au-Prince held.
- 1950 - Population: 134,117.
- 1956 – Port Administration of Port-au-Prince established.
- 1960 – Jean Deeb becomes mayor.
- 1965 – Duvalier International Airport opens.
- 1971 - Population: 458,675 city; 493,932 urban agglomeration.
- 1979 – Radio Port-au-Prince established.
- 1983 - University of Port-au-Prince founded.
- 1986 – March: Unrest.
- 1988
  - Université Caraïbe founded.
  - 11 September: St Jean Bosco massacre.

=== 1990s ===
- 1990
  - Evans Paul elected mayor.
  - June: Irene Ridore becomes mayor.
  - Population: 690,168 (estimate).
- 1991
  - 29 September: 1991 Haitian coup d'état.
  - October: Organization of American States trade embargo begins; city economy slows.
- 1993 – OAS/UN International Civilian Mission in Haiti headquartered in city.
- 1994 – 19 September: United States military intervention begins.
- 1995
  - Manno Charlemagne becomes mayor.
  - Foundation for Knowledge and Liberty headquartered in city.
  - Université Notre Dame d'Haïti founded.
- 1999 – Population: 990,558.

== 21st century ==
=== 2000s ===
- 2001 – Coup attempt at National Palace.
- 2003 – Population: 704,776.
- 2004
  - 200th anniversary of the Haitian Slave Revolution victory.
  - February: 2004 Haitian coup d'état.
  - 29 February: United Nations Multinational Interim Force begins operating in city.
  - June: United Nations Stabilization Mission in Haiti headquartered in city.
  - 30 September: Pro-Aristide demonstration turns violent.
- 2007 – Jean Yves Jason becomes mayor.
- 2008 – April: Protest against food prices.

=== 2010s ===
- 2010
  - 12 January: 2010 Haiti earthquake.
  - October: Cholera outbreak begins.
- 2011 – Marché en Fer restored.

== See also ==
- Port-au-Prince history
- Timeline of Haitian history

== Bibliography ==
=== in English ===
- Jedidiah Morse (1797). "Port au Prince". The American Gazetteer. Boston, Massachusetts: S. Hall, and Thomas & Andrews. OL 23272543M.
- Charles Mackenzie (1830), "(Port au Prince)", Notes on Haiti, London: H. Colburn and R. Bentley, OCLC 4099494
- B.B. Edwards (1832), "Hayti", Missionary Gazetteer: comprising a geographical and statistical account of the various stations of the American and foreign Protestant missionary societies, Boston: William Hyde & Co.
- "Santo Domingo". Encyclopædia Metropolitana. Vol. 18. London: B. Fellowes et al. 1845. p. 214. hdl:2027/mdp.39015082485213. "Port au Prince"
- John Ramsay McCulloch (1875), "Port-au-Prince", A Dictionary, Practical, Theoretical, and Historical, of Commerce and Commercial Navigation, London: Longmans, Green, hdl:2027/njp.32101079877088 – via HathiTrust
- "Port au Prince" . Encyclopædia Britannica. Vol. 19 (9th ed.). 1885. pp. 526–527.
- "(Port au Prince)", Appleton's Illustrated Hand-book of American Winter Resorts, New York: D. Appleton & Company, 1893, hdl:2027/nnc1.ar52059723
- "Port au Prince" . Encyclopædia Britannica. Vol. 22 (11th ed.). 1910. p. 112.
- Harry Alverson Franck (1920), "(Port au Prince)", Roaming through the West Indies, New York: Century Company, OCLC 485345, OL 6628468M
- "Port au Prince". Blue Book of Hayti. Compagnie Biographique. 1920. hdl:2027/nyp.33433016946174. OCLC 13516897.
- David Marley (2005), "Haiti: Port-au-Prince", Historic Cities of the Americas, Santa Barbara, Calif: ABC-CLIO, p. 121+, ISBN 1576070271
- J. Christopher Kovats-Bernat (2006). "Factional Terror, Paramilitarism and Civil War in Haiti: The View from Port-au-Prince, 1994–2004". Anthropologica. 48 (1): 117–139. doi:10.2307/25605301. JSTOR 25605301.

=== in French ===
- Victor Meignan (1878). "Port au Prince". Aux Antilles (in French). Paris: E. Plon et Cie. hdl:2027/nyp.33433067340137.
- Paul Deléage (1887). "Port au Prince". Haïti en 1886 (in French). Paris: Dentu. hdl:2027/uc1.b3626652.
- Georges Corvington (1987). Port-au-Prince au cours des ans: la capitale d'Haiti sous l'occupation, 1922–1934 (in French). Port au Prince: Editions Henry Deschamps.
- Georges Eddy LUCIEN (2007). "Port au Prince". Port-au Prince (1915-1956) : modernisation manquée : centralisation et dysfonctionnements (These de doctorat) (in French). Toulouse: Brepols.
