= List of hospitals in Haiti =

This is a list of hospitals in Haiti.

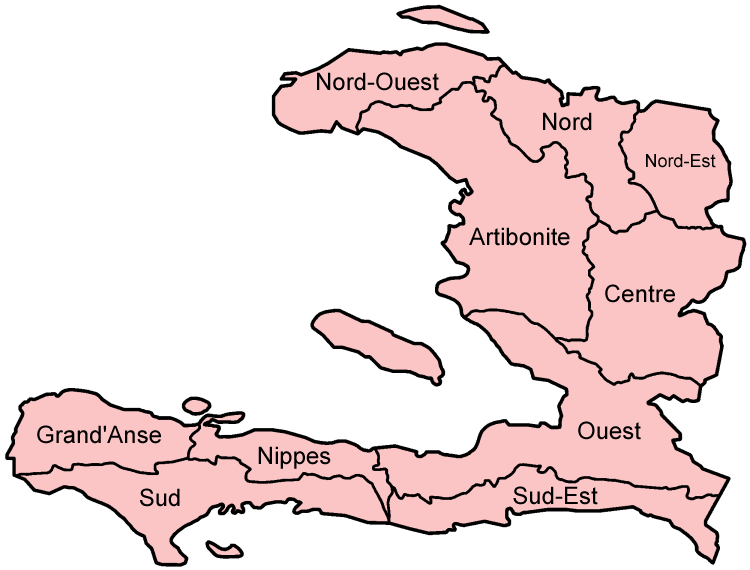
Map of Haiti with administrative divisions.

- Département de l'Ouest:
  - Hôpital adventiste d'Haïti, Port-au-Prince
  - Hôpital de la Trinité, Port-au-Prince
  - Hopital Notre Dame S.A., Pétion-Ville
  - Hôpital CITYMED de Pétion-Ville, Pétion-Ville
  - Hôpital Sainte-Croix, Léogâne
  - Hôpital Camejo, Léogâne
  - Hôpital de l'Université d'État, Port-au-Prince
  - Hôpital du Canapé Vert, Port-au-Prince
  - Unité Chirurgicale, Pétion-Ville
  - Santa Madre Tuya
  - Hôpital Saint-Damien (Nos Petits Frères et Soeurs), Tabarre
  - Hôpital Saint-François de Sales
  - Hôpital sentinel laboule Zone 1 HT6142
  - Hôpital Asile Français
  - Hôpital de la Communauté Haïtienne, Pétion-Ville
  - Hôpital Grâce pour Enfants, Port-au-Prince
  - Hospital Bernard Mevs Project Medishare, Port-au-Prince
  - Hôpital Espoir, Port-au-Prince
  - Hôpital Saint-Esprit, Port-au-Prince
  - Centre Hospitalier Sainte Marie, Port-au-Prince
- Département du Nord:
  - Hôpital Universitaire Justinien, Cap-Haïtien
  - Hôpital Sacré Coeur, Milot - supported by the CRUDEM Foundation
  - Hôpital Bon Samaritain, Limbé
  - Alyans Sante Borgne, Borgne
- Département de l'Artibonite:
  - Hôpital Albert Schweitzer, Deschapelles
  - Hôpital La Providence, Gonaïves
  - Hopital Notre Dame S.A., Gonaives
  - Hôpital Saint Nicolas, Saint Marc
  - Hôpital Bienfaisance de Pignon
  - Hôpital Claire-Heureuse, Dessalines
  - Hôpital Camejo, Leogane
  - Centre Hospitalier Victor Binkley, Pierre Payen - Project Help Haiti
- Département du Nord-Ouest:
  - Hôpital de Immaculée Conception, Port-de-Paix
- Département du Sud-est:
  - Hôpital Saint-Michel de Jacmel
- Département des Nippes:
  - Hôpital Sainte-Thérèse de Miragoâne
- Département du Sud:
  - Hôpital Immaculée Conception, Les Cayes
  - Hopital Notre Dame S.A., Cayes
  - Hôpital Saint-Boniface, Fond des Blancs - supported by Health Equity International (formerly St. Boniface Haiti Foundation)
- Département du Centre:
  - Zanmi Lasante, Cange
  - Hôpital Sainte-Thérèse de Hinche
  - Hôpital Universitaire de Mirebalais, Mirebalais
  - Hôpital General Fraternite de Hinche, Hinche, Haiti
- Departement de la Grand'Anse
  - Hôpital Sainte-Antoine de Jérémie
