= Van Zeeland =

van Zeeland is a Dutch surname meaning "from Zeeland". Notable people with the surname include:

- Ashley Van Zeeland, American neuroscientist
- Hans van Zeeland (born 1954), Dutch water polo player
- Paul van Zeeland (1893–1973), Belgian lawyer, politician and economist
