= D. Holmes Morton =

American physician

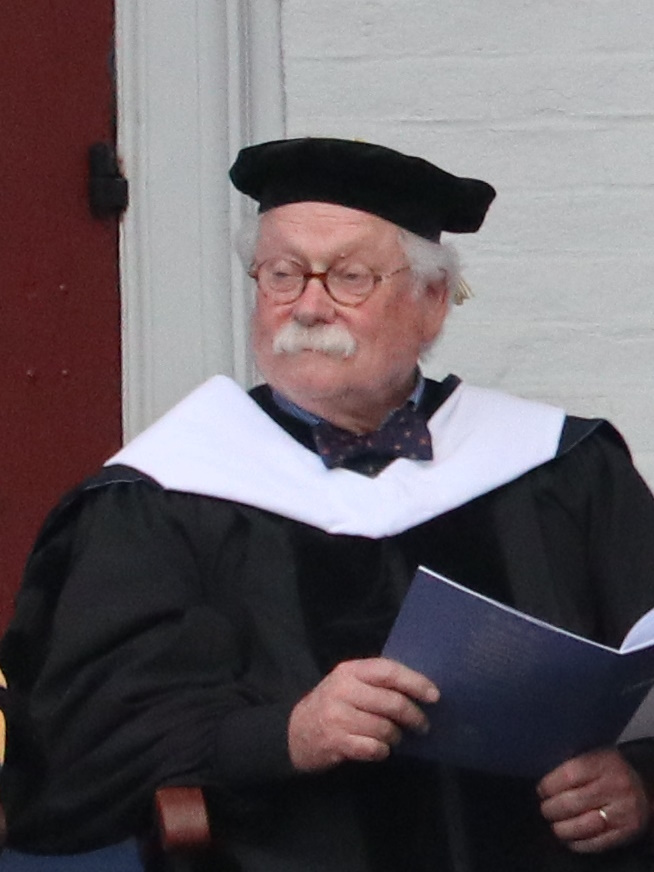
- Dr. D. Holmes Morton in 2024
- Education: Trinity College; Harvard Medical School
- Awards: Albert Schweitzer Prize for Humanitarianism; MacArthur Fellows Program
- Scientific career
- Fields: Medical doctor
- Workplaces: Clinic for Special Children

D. Holmes Morton is an American medical doctor specializing in genetic disorders of Old Order Amish and Mennonite children. In 1989 he established the Clinic for Special Children in Strasburg, Pennsylvania, to focus on these diseases.

== Life ==
Morton, a graduate of Virginia Episcopal School, is a former member of the United States Merchant Marine and a 1979 graduate of Trinity College in Hartford, Connecticut, where he was an avid reader of everything from literature to developmental psychology, neurobiology, and child development.

He attended Harvard Medical School and served his residency at Children's Hospital Boston. His interest in biochemical genetics research led him to Children's Hospital of Philadelphia, Johns Hopkins University, and finally to the Pennsylvania Amish community. Although he could have worked at a prominent research institution, Morton and his wife Caroline chose to establish the clinic as a nonprofit organization.

Morton received the Albert Schweitzer Prize for Humanitarianism in 1993 and was named one of Time magazine's "Heroes of Medicine" in 1997. In 2006 he was awarded a MacArthur Foundation "genius grant" for his work.
