= Ashley Van Zeeland =

American biotechnology executive

- Born: 1982 (age 43–44)
- Education: University of Colorado Boulder, UCLA, University of California, San Diego
- Known for: Vice president at Illumina; Founder of Cypher Genomics
- Scientific career
- Fields: genomics, neuroscience
- Workplaces: Illumina; Cypher Genomics; Scripps Genomic Medicine

Ashley Van Zeeland is an American biotechnology executive. As of 2026, she is a vice president for American biotechnology company Illumina and the head of global strategic accounts. She previously worked as a neuroscientist, with her research focusing on genomics, genetics, and biotechnology in the fields of autism and anorexia nervosa. Her work on autism revealed that genetic variants were linked to different communication pathways within the brain, and her work related anorexia nervosa to an enzyme regulating cholesterol metabolism.

She co-founded Cypher Genomics in March 2011 with Eric Topol, Nicholas Schork, and Ali Torkamani in La Jolla, California. She was the CEO of Cypher Genomics, which partnered with the Clinic for Special Children in Strasburg, Pennsylvania to diagnose rare genetic diseases among Amish and Mennonite patients, a population with a relatively high incidence of genetic disease. She left the company in October 2017 after its acquisition by Human Longevity.

Zeeland joined Illumina in 2018 initially as a vice president for "Product Development Business Operations & Systems Integration". In 2022, she became the VP for the Illumina Open Innovation division and the VP of corporate development in 2023.

== Education and work ==
Van Zeeland received her BA in psychology from the University of Colorado Boulder in 2002. Afterwards, she worked from 2002 to 2004 as a project coordinator for the Colorado Learning Disabilities Twin Study at the University of Denver. Van Zeeland also worked as a project coordinator for the UCLA Autism Center of Excellence from 2004 to 2005. She then received her PhD in neuroscience from the University of California, Los Angeles in 2009. For her PhD, she worked in the Bookheimer Lab, completing her thesis on "Imaging Genetics of Frontostriatal Function in Children with Autism Spectrum Disorders" using funding from a Neurogenetics Training Grant.

After receiving her PhD, she worked as a consultant on a consortium study to investigate mitochondrial dysfunction in children with autism at the University of California San Diego from 2009 to 2010. She went on to attain her MBA from the University of California, San Diego Rady School of Management in 2012. While at Rady, she began developing the idea for Cypher Genomics through the school's Lab to Market course series and its business accelerator mystartupXX. From 2009 to 2011, she worked as a distinguished Dickinson Research Fellow at the Scripps Translational Medicine Institute. After receiving her MBA, she served as the Director of Strategic Partnerships at Scripps Genomic Medicine where she managed a portfolio of public-private partnerships for CTSA supported Scripps Translational Science Institute.

== Research ==
In addition to co-founding Cypher Genomics, Van Zeeland is also a published author on subjects of both anorexia and autism. As mentioned in the abstract, Van Zeeland's work with autism showed that there are genetic variants linked in different communication pathways. The study was published in Science Translational Medicine in her 2010 article, "Altered functional connectivity in frontal lobe circuits is associated with variation in the autism risk gene CNTNAP2". The study used a combination of genetics and imaging phenotypes to determine that a lack of connectivity between the frontal lobe may be connected to the genetic variation at CNTNAP2 that predisposes subjects to autism. Van Zeeland was the primary author on a 2013 anorexia nervosa study that was completed at the Scripps Translational Science Institute. The study was entitled "Evidence for the role of EPHX2 gene variants in anorexia nervosa" and was published in Molecular Psychiatry. This study looked at 150 different candidate genes in over 1200 anorexia nervosa subjects and over 1900 control subjects in order to try to find a genetic difference in subjects with the disease. Through sequencing and genotyping of the candidate genes of the subjects, it was determined that there was evidence that showed a variance in the EPHX2 gene to be linked to anorexia nervosa as well as elevated cholesterol levels.

== Honors and awards ==
In 2013, Van Zeeland was named a San Diego Young Influential. The San Diego Young Influential's Award "highlights young entrepreneurs and successful business leaders who are the next generation of Top Influentials, San Diego County's young movers and shakers." In 2012, she was named a PitchFest Finalist by the San Diego Venture Group, meaning that Cypher Genomic's business pitch beat out hundreds of other contestants from around the country. In 2011, Van Zeeland was a part of the mystartupXX Program when the program received a $50,000 grant from the U.S. Small Business Association. The mission of the mystartupXX Program is "to nurture the next generation of female founder and female-led technology startups through mentorship, education and funding." In 2010, Van Zeeland won the International Society for Autism Research Neurobiological Dissertation Award for her work discovering genetic variants are linked to different communication pathways within the brain. Van Zeeland also received the honor of being named a Dickinson Fellow in 2009. In 2007, she was the recipient of the Pre-doctoral Ruth L. Kirschstein National Research Service Award which is an award given out by the National Institutes of Health.
