= Albert Schweitzer Prize for Humanitarianism =

Humanitarian and service award

The Albert Schweitzer Prize for Humanitarianism is a prize given to people who made exemplary contributions to humanity and the environment. The goal of the prize is to advance the cause of humanitarianism. The prize was established in 1986 by Albert Toepfer, an international grain merchant from Hamburg, Germany. Previously given under the auspices of the Alexander von Humboldt Foundation in New York and administered by Johns Hopkins University, it is named after noted humanitarian and physician Albert Schweitzer and is now administered by The Albert Schweitzer Fellowship.

== Recipients ==
Recipients include:

- National Parks Conservation Association and Paul Pritchard (1986)
- Desmond Tutu (1986)
- President Jimmy Carter (1987)
- Marian Wright Edelman (1988)
- Sister Maria Isolina Ferre Aguayo (1989)
- Norman Cousins (1990)
- C. Everett Koop (1991)
- Billy Frank, Jr. (1992)
- D. Holmes Morton (1993)
- Edgar Wayburn (1995)
- Sharon Darling (1998) founder, National Center for Family Learning
- Gwen Grant Mellon (2000)
- Robert S. Lawrence (2002)
- David Satcher (2009)
- H. Jack Geiger (2010)
- James O'Connell (2012)
- Regina Benjamin, MD, MBA, 18th U.S. Surgeon General, (2009–2013) (2013)
- Irwin Redlener, MD, co-founder and president of the Children's Health Fund (2014)
- Bernard Harris (2014)
- Isabel Guerrero (2015)
- Michael Walton (2015)
- Gracie Cafnar (2016)
- Bob Sanborn (2017)
- Carl Josehart (2018)
- Lisa Helfman (2019)
- Anna Babin (2020)
- Ruth Simmons (2021)
- Ann Barnes (2023)
- Mike Nichols (2024)

Albert Schweitzer Gold Medal for Humanitarianism:

- Dwayne O. Andreas, Chairman of the Board, ADM
- Mary Woodard Lasker, President, Lasker Foundation
- President George H. W. Bush (1997) for his role in negotiating the peaceful unification of Germany.
- Ted Turner (2001)
- Teresa Heinz (2003)
