= Hôpital de la Trinité =

Geography
- Location: Port-au-Prince, Haiti
- Coordinates: 18.554321°N 72.310711°W

History
- Closed: 2010

Links
- Lists: Hospitals in Haiti

Hôpital de la Trinité (English: Trinity Hospital) was a hospital in Port-au-Prince, Haïti. It was operated by the Médecins Sans Frontières (MSF) which operates an emergency clinic at the hospital and in three other centers in the capital. It was where most of the injured from the 2008 Pétion-Ville school collapse were treated. The hospital was destroyed in the 2010 Haiti earthquake; medical treatment by MSF staff was subsequently moved to improvised tent facilities adjacent to the hospital building.

In 2012, trauma services were relocated to the Nap Kenbé hospital, in the Tabarre neighborhood of Port-au-Prince.
