= Hôpital Albert Schweitzer Haiti =

Hôpital Albert Schweitzer
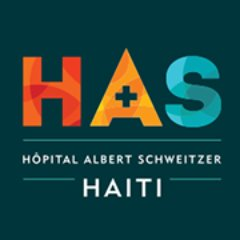

Geography
- Location: Deschapelles, Artibonite, Haiti
- Coordinates: 19.074354°N 72.491103°W

Organisation
- Funding: Non-profit hospital
- Type: General

Services
- Beds: 120

History
- Opened: 1956

Links
- Website: www.hashaiti.org
- Lists: Hospitals in Haiti

The Hôpital Albert Schweitzer Haiti is a hospital in Deschapelles, Haiti. It was established in 1956 by Larry Mellon, who was inspired by Hôpital Albert Schweitzer and the life and philosophy of Albert Schweitzer.

== History ==
In 1947, Larry Mellon, inspired by Albert Schweitzer and his work in Africa at Hôpital Albert Schweitzer, went to medical school at Tulane University with the intention of following in Schweitzer's footsteps. He went to Haiti in 1952 on a research trip as part of his medical studies, and during that visit decided to locate the clinic in the Artibonite Valley; he was granted land that was formerly a banana plantation by then president of Haiti, Paul Magloire.

He and his wife Gwen Grant Mellon opened a hospital they named Hôpital Albert Schweitzer in Deschapelles, Haiti in 1956. When it opened, the facility had two operating rooms, a laboratory, X-ray facilities, a pharmacy, and had its own water system, electric power, machine and vehicle shops, laundry and food services.

In 2010 and again in 2021, the hospital played an essential role in earthquake relief.

== Services ==
By 1970, the facility had grown from 80 to 120 beds and provided annually about 60,000 outpatient visits, 3500 admissions and 2500 operations.

By 2010, the facility in Haiti had expanded to include 12 health clinics that were staffed by Haitian volunteers; they offered and preventive and community education and focused on women's health and HIV treatment and prevention. At the time the hospital performed about 2,000 surgical procedures each year and served about 60,000 people as outpatients, and about 100,000 people were treated each year at the satellite clinics.

In 2015 it spent about $6 million on hospital operations and about $400,000 on the clinics.
