= William Larimer Mellon Jr. =

American philanthropist and physician (1910–1989)

William Larimer "Larry" Mellon Jr. (1910–1989) was an American philanthropist and physician.

Mellon was born in Pittsburgh June 26, 1910, the son of financier William Larimer Mellon Sr. and a grandnephew of U.S. Treasury Secretary Andrew W. Mellon. His family fortune derived from Gulf Oil, Westinghouse, BNY Mellon, Koppers, Alcoa and others.

Mellon was married twice, the second time to dude ranch riding instructor and single mother Gwen Grant Mellon in 1946. He attended Princeton University for one year, worked for his family's company, Mellon Financial, and served in the OSS during World War II.

Mellon owned and operated a cattle ranch in Arizona until, at the age of 37, he read about, and then studied, Albert Schweitzer's medical missionary work in Gabon, and resolved, with Schweitzer's encouragement and guidance, to create a similar third-world hospital. He and Gwen Grant Mellon enrolled at Tulane University; he received his medical degree in 1954 at the age of 44, and she became qualified as a medical-laboratory technician. In 1956, the Mellons opened the Hôpital Albert Schweitzer Haiti in Deschapelles, Haiti.

Mellon died in Deschapelles at the age of 79 from cancer and Parkinson's disease, on August 3, 1989.
