= 2009 North Dakota floods =

Natural disaster in North Dakota, United States

The US State of North Dakota experienced significant flooding in its major river basins in 2009, following abnormally heavy winter snows atop saturated and frozen ground.

== Background ==
Ground which was already saturated when it froze at the onset of winter, melting snow which could not be absorbed by the frozen ground, and additional precipitation from a rain storm on March 22 and a later snowstorm, are reasons for the serious flooding. Heavy snowfalls fell in the state toward the end of March, adding to the existing snowpack.

=== Flooding ===
Beulah and Hazen were affected by the Knife River and Spring Creek floods. Linton was affected by Big Beaver Creek floods. Barlow, Carrington, Napoleon was affected by overland flooding from heavy snowmelt. Mott was affected by the Cannonball River floods. Wells County, Foster County, and Stutsman County was affected by Pipestem river. Eddy County, Foster County, Stutsman County, La Moure County, and Dickey County was affected by James River.

=== Ice jams ===
Explosives had to be used blow up an ice jam on the Missouri River North Bismarck, North Dakota in Double Ditch. It was successful. Flooding would cause problems south of the Bismarck Expressway and west of Washington Street.

== Red River ==
The 2009 Red River flood along the Red River of the North in North Dakota and Minnesota in the United States and Manitoba in Canada brought record flood levels to the Fargo-Moorhead area. The flood is a result of saturated and frozen ground, Spring snowmelt exacerbated by additional rain and snow storms, and virtually flat terrain. Communities along the Red River prepared for more than a week as the U.S. National Weather Service continuously updated the predictions for the city of Fargo, North Dakota with an increasingly higher projected river crest. Originally predicted to reach a level of near 43 feet (13 m) at Fargo by March 29, the river in fact crested at 40.82 feet (12.44 m) at 12:15 a.m. March 28, and started a slow decline. The river continued to rise to the north as the crest moved downstream.

=== Predictions and preparations ===
==== Wahpeton ====
Early predictions for the Wahpeton area saw a predicted level of at least 16 feet (4.9 m). By March 24, the National Weather Service predicted the crest in Wahpeton and Breckenridge not to top 18 feet (5.5 m), below the cities' levees.

==== Fargo area ====
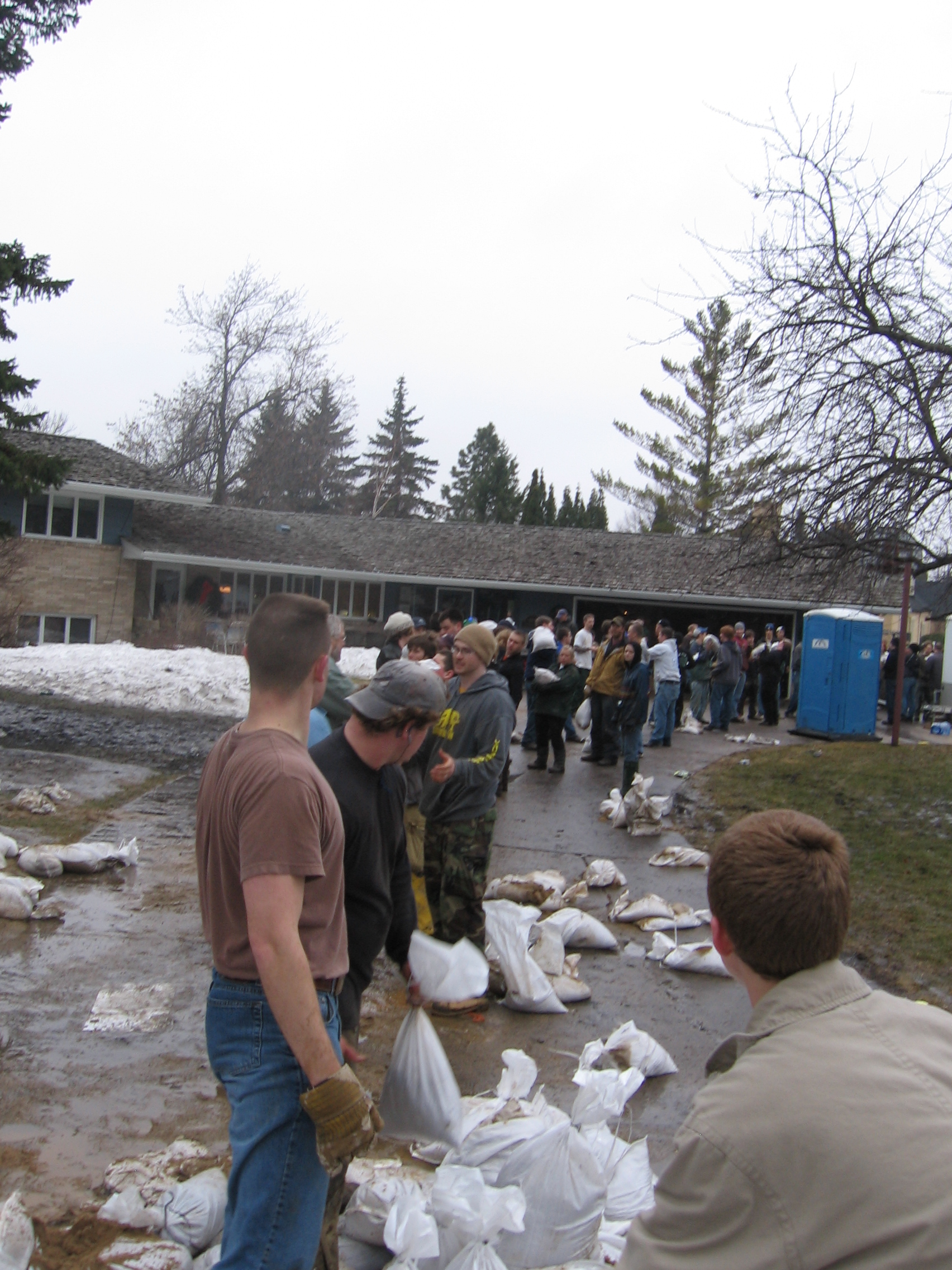
A line of sandbagging volunteers in Fargo, North Dakota.

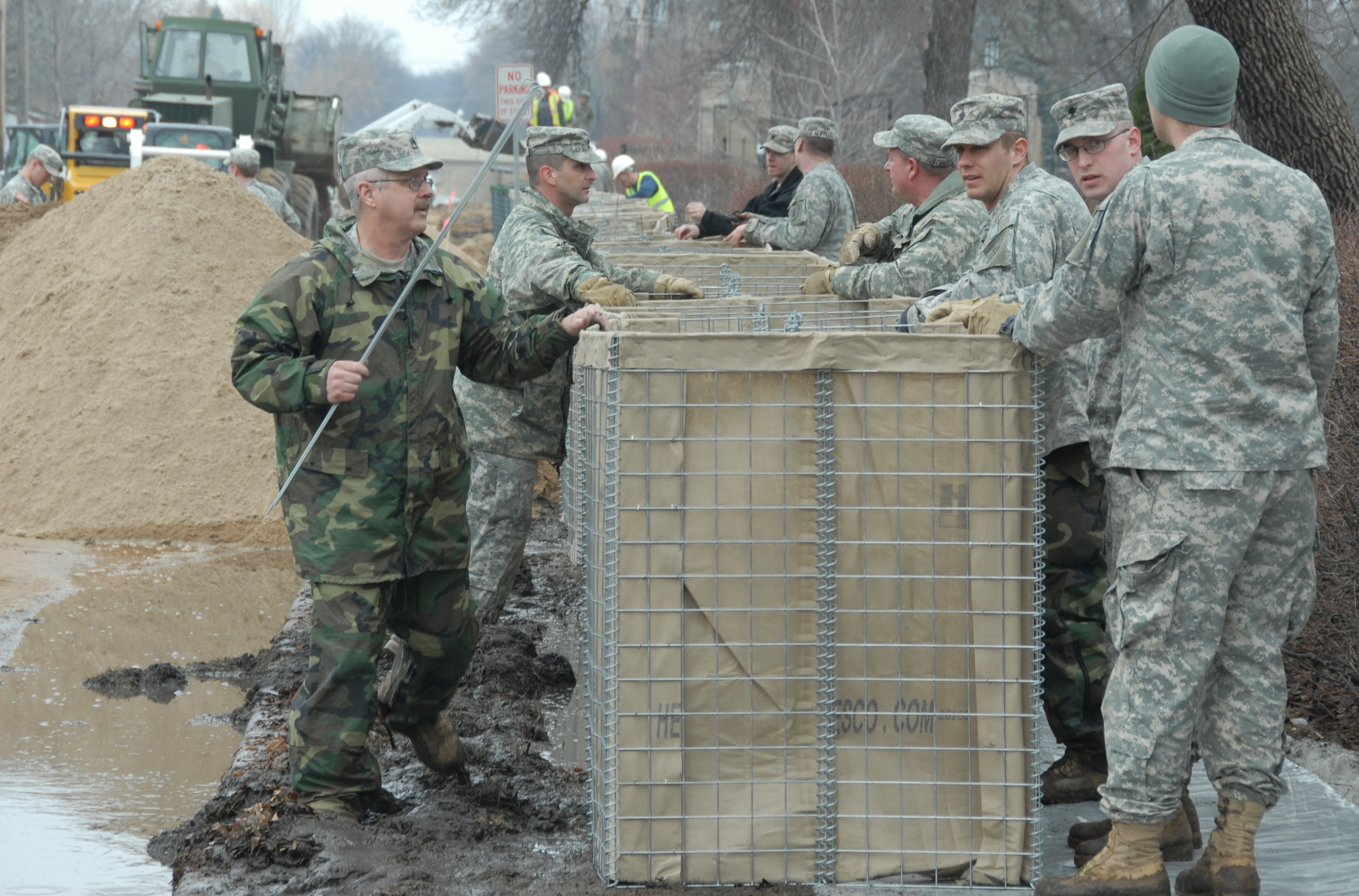
HESCO collapsible barriers were used to prevent flooding

Warnings for the 2009 flood occurred as early as March 9 when the National Weather Service warned that the Fargo-Moorhead area could see a significant flood of between 35 feet (11 m) and 36 feet (11 m). As preparations began for the flooding on March 16, North Dakota Governor John Hoeven declared a statewide disaster in anticipation of flooding across the state. On March 19, the National Weather Service raised the predicted flood level in the Fargo area to between 37 feet (11 m) and 40 feet (12 m). The city began filling sandbags on March 20. In anticipation of a rain and snow storm, the predicted crest level was raised on March 22 to a range from 39 feet (12 m) to 41 feet (12 m).

Volunteers continued preparing sandbags, with 560,000 bags filled by late March 22 out of an expected 1.5 million to 2 million needed. By March 24, residents in Fargo-Moorhead had filled over 1 million sandbags and were attempting to fill a total of 2 million by the 26th. A levee in Georgetown, Minnesota was raised another two feet, and emergency dikes were being built in Fargo, Moorhead, Harwood, Grafton and Richland County. The predicted flood crest was raised again on March 26, changed to between 41 feet (12 m) and 42 feet (13 m) by March 28, with a possibility of 43 feet (13 m).

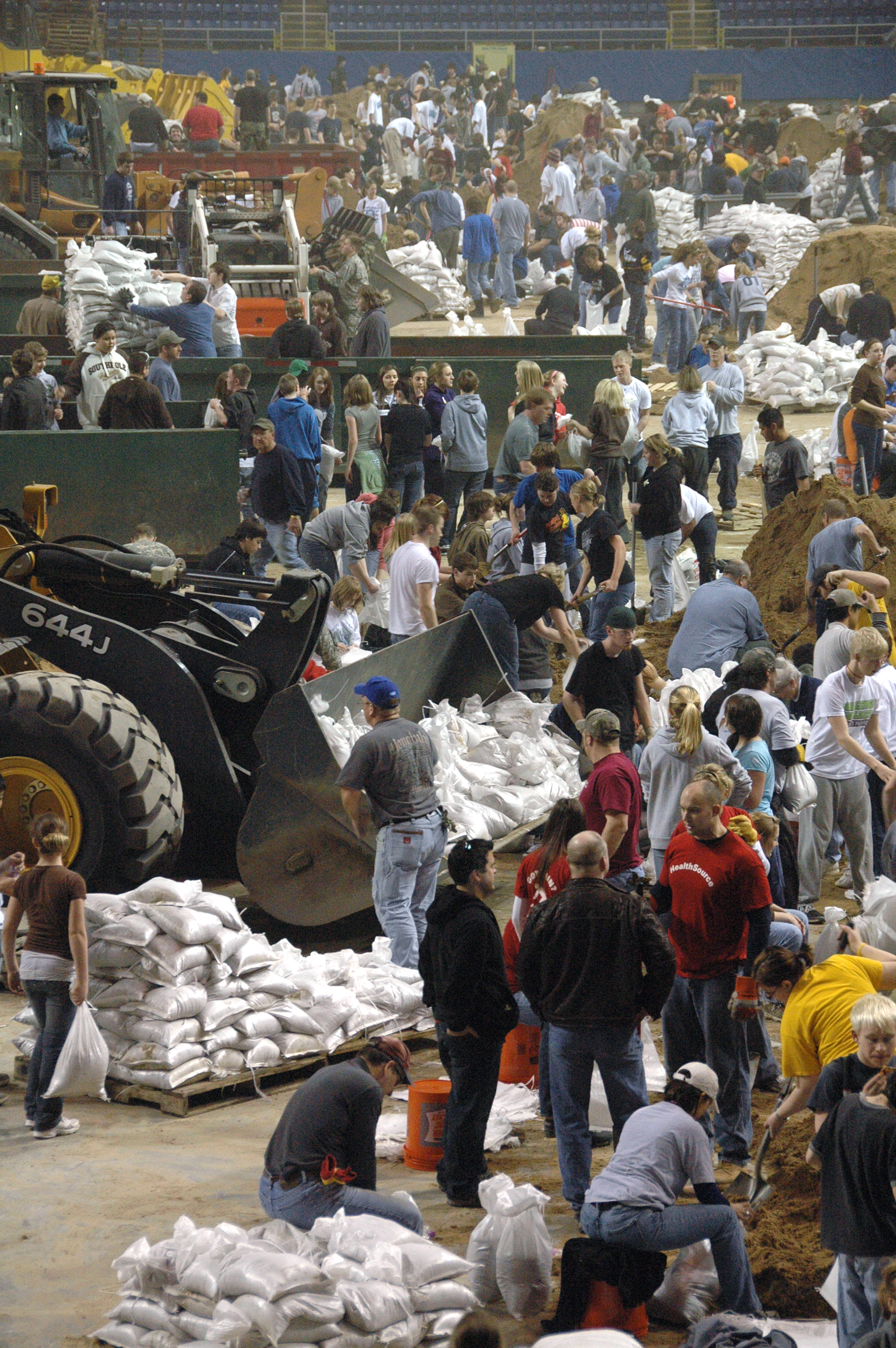
Volunteers fill sandbags in the Fargodome.

In addition to the sandbags the construction of the dikes protecting the city has required large amounts of clay. Clay has been brought from several places in and around the city, including the soccer field at Centennial Elementary School and around Discovery Middle School.

At 7:15 P.M. CDT on March 26, 2009, the river exceeded the 1997 crest of 39.57 feet (12.06 m) at Fargo, which was the previous second-highest crest. The projected crest is 24 feet (7.3 m) above flood stage and higher than the record-setting floods in 1997 and 1897.

==== Grand Forks ====
In the Grand Forks, North Dakota area, flood predictions released February 27 predicted a possibility of a flood crest between 44 feet (13 m) and 46 feet (14 m). The snow storm that struck March 9–10 raised the predicted levels between 47 feet (14 m) and 50 feet (15 m) prompting the city to declare a state of emergency. On March 22 the predicted crest level was changed to 52 feet (16 m).

At 2:30 A.M. CDT, the National Weather Service offices in Grand Forks issued a Flash Flood Warning for extreme east-central Cass County due to a levee breach in Fargo on Linden Avenue. With the river now more than 6 meters (20 feet) above flood stage, there appears to be a growing sense in Fargo that despite best efforts, it may not be possible to build dikes high enough to hold back the river.

== See also ==
- Red River Flood (disambiguation)
