= Hôpital Universitaire Justinien =

Hôpital Universitaire Justinien (Justinien University Hospital)
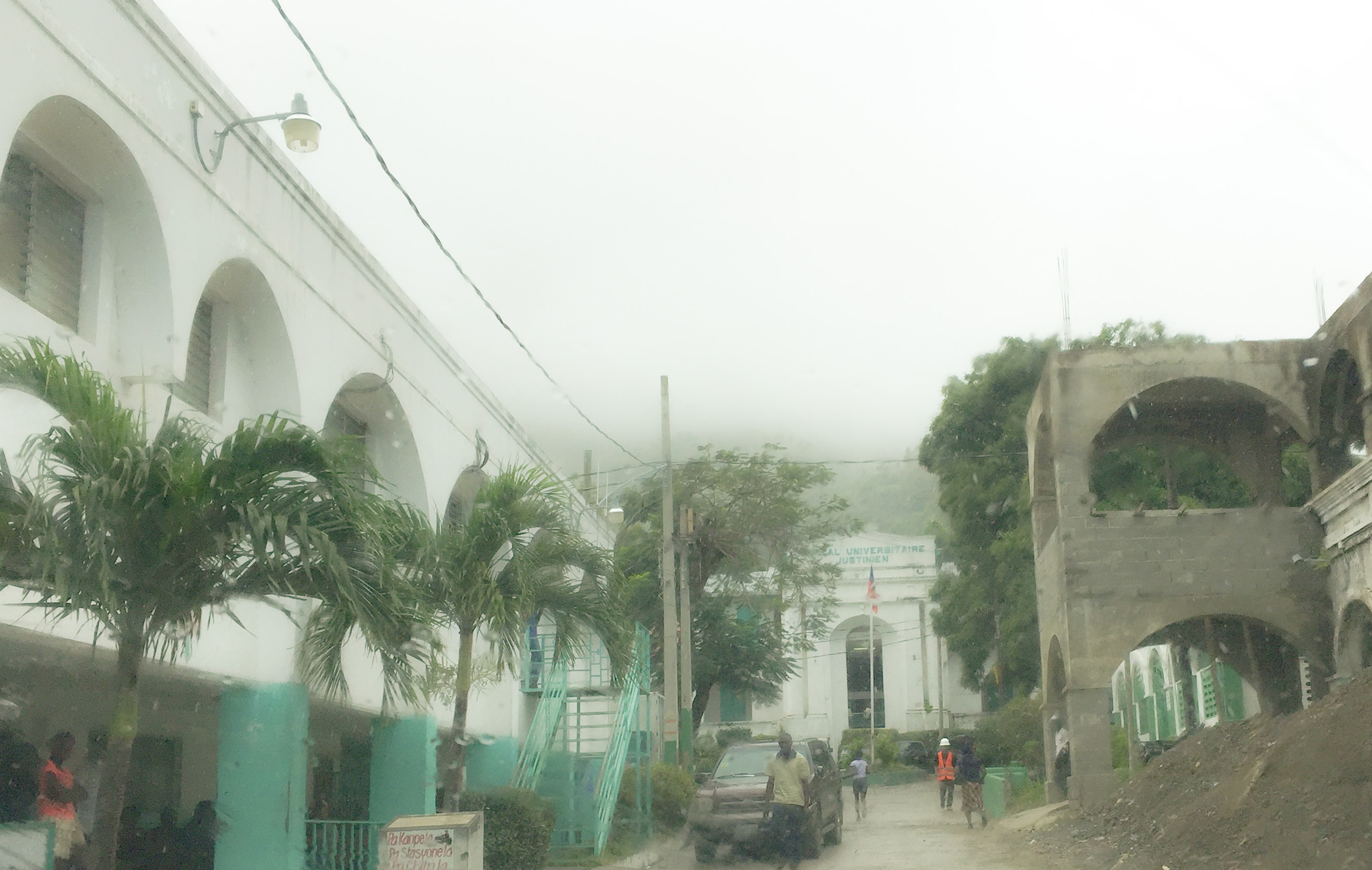

Geography
- Location: Rue 17 Q, Cap Haïtien, Haiti
- Coordinates: 19.76262°N 72.20579°W

Organisation
- Care system: Private
- Type: Teaching

Services
- Beds: 250

History
- Opened: 1890 (hospice), 1920 (hospital)

Links
- Other links: Hospitals in Haiti

Hôpital Universitaire Justinien is the main hospital in the second largest city in Haiti, Cap-Haïtien. It is located close to the center of the city near the Place d'Armes Cathedral. The hospital is named after Justinien Etienne, a local magistrate who spearheaded and oversaw the construction of the hospital. Hôpital Universitaire Justinien began as a hospice in 1890 and was later transformed into a hospital in 1920 during the United States occupation of Haiti.

Hôpital Universitaire Justinien is a teaching hospital with 250 inpatient beds, with approximately 60 medical residents training in disciplines including internal medicine, general surgery, family medicine, pediatrics, obstetrics/gynecology, urology, orthopedic surgery, otolaryngology, and anesthesiology. With help from the University of Miami, the hospital was the first in Haiti to start a family medicine residency program. The hospital has a laboratory, pharmacy and radiology services for both inpatients and outpatients.

The hospital receives some financial support through the state and private organizations, and is able to provide a level of free medical care in addition to its fee-based services.
