= Grace Divine School collapse =

2008 building collapse in Port-au-Prince, Haiti

- Date: Wednesday, November 12, 2008
- Time: unknown
- Location: Port-au-Prince, Haiti; 18°32′N 72°20′W
- Injuries: 9

The Grace Divine School collapse occurred on November 12, 2008, at the Grace Divine Primary and Secondary School in the Canapé Vert section of Port-au-Prince, Haiti. The collapse, along with the 2008 Pétion-Ville school collapse, was the second such incident in Haiti in less than a week.

== Collapse ==
The school building was a two-story concrete structure built on the side of a hill. According to one AFP witness, "chunks of the school's walls were scattered on the ground, its concrete roof was sagging, and there were clear cracks in the remaining walls".

No cause was immediately apparent, but poor-quality construction and heavy rains in the preceding days were believed to have been contributing factors. The Red Cross reported that some students were jumping and dancing in a musical just prior to collapse, which may have strained the weakened structure.

== Casualties ==
Around 100 students, ages 5 to 12, attended Grace Divine School. The collapse occurred during a break in classes, when most of the school's students were outside in the yard. At least nine individuals were injured, including two students who were taken to hospital. A preliminary search reported that no one was trapped in the debris and that there were no fatalities.

Compared to the Pétion-Ville disaster, the number and severity of casualties in Port-au-Price were low because of relatively little damage to the buildings and most students were outside of the building during collapse.

== Reaction and rescue ==
After hearing of the collapse parents anxiously gathered at the school, fearing a similar deadly outcome of the collapse of the La Promesse school in Pétion-Ville. Foreign and domestic rescue teams were quick to arrive on scene due to their involvement in the Pétion-Ville collapse.

At one school a mile away from Grace Divine, students believed their own school building was shaking; there was no damage but two children were injured in the panic.

Initial information about the disaster was reported to the international media by Dr. Jean Pierre Guiteau, the executive officer of the Haitian Red Cross.
