= Université Notre Dame d'Haïti =

Catholic Haitian university

Coordinates: 18.5287°N 72.3353°W

University Notre Dame of Haiti
- Université Notre Dame d'Haïti
- Motto: Une Université catholique pour une Haiti nouvelle
- Established: November 18, 1995; 30 years ago
- Rector: Augustin Almy
- Location: Port-au-Prince, Haiti
- Website: undh.edu.ht

The Université Notre Dame d'Haïti (French pronunciation: [ynivɛʁsite nɔtʁə dam daiti]) is a Catholic university in Port-au-Prince, Haïti. It was founded in 1996 and is organized in five faculties.

== Organization ==
The university is divided into five faculties:

- Faculty of Medicine and Health Sciences
- Faculty of Economical, Social and Political Sciences
- Faculty of Administrative Sciences - Cap-Haïtien
- Faculty of Agriculture - Cayes
- Faculty of Administrative Sciences - Jacmel
