= Clinic for Special Children =

American nonprofit healthcare organization

- Type: Nonprofit Organization
- Industry: Health care
- Founded: 1989; 37 years ago
- Headquarters: Gordonville, Pennsylvania, USA
- Key people: Adam Heaps, MS, MBA; Laura Poskitt, DO; Erik Puffenberger, PhD; Karlla Brigatti, MS, CGC
- Website: clinicforspecialchildren.org

The Clinic for Special Children (CSC) is a primary pediatric and adult care and genetic research clinic located in Gordonville, Pennsylvania. The facility specializes in genetic problems of the plain sects, such as the Amish and Old Order Mennonites. It was founded in 1989. The most common genetic disorders treated by the Clinic are glutaric acidemia type I (GA1), which is common in the Amish population and maple syrup urine disease (MSUD), which has a high prevalence in the Old Order Mennonites.

== Establishment ==
The Clinic for Special Children was founded by the Plain community with Dr. D. Holmes Morton and his wife, Caroline in 1989. The original clinic building was raised by the Plain community in Strasburg, Pennsylvania and completed in 1990. In 2024, the organization moved to a new facility in Gordonville, Pennsylvania after a successful $13.3 million capital campaign. In addition to patient care facilities, the Clinic also houses its own laboratory, providing rapid biochemical and molecular genetic testing. The Clinic sees over 1,700 active patients and performs over 5,000 biochemical and genetic tests each year.
