= 2008 Pétion-Ville school collapse =

Building collapse in Port-au-Prince, Haiti

- Pétion-Ville (Haiti) Location of Pétion-Ville within Haiti
- Date: Friday, November 7, 2008
- Time: 10:00 am EST
- Location: Pétion-Ville, Haiti; 18.516°N 72.283°W
- Deaths: 94
- Injuries: 150+

The Pétion-Ville school collapse occurred on November 7, 2008, in Pétion-Ville, a suburb of Port-au-Prince, Haiti, when the church-operated Collège La Promesse Évangélique ("The Evangelical Promise School") collapsed at around 10:00 a.m. local time (15:00 GMT). About 700 students from kindergarten through high school attended the school; however, it is unclear how many were in the three-story building when it collapsed. At least 93 people, mostly children, were confirmed killed, and over 150 injured. At least 35 students, 13 girls and 22 boys, were rescued from the rubble alive on November 8.

== Collapse ==
During the collapse, the first floor of the school buckled under, and the second and third floors of the building came down upon it. The collapse also destroyed several nearby homes. However, only the first and second floors were filled with students, and some students were in the playground area. The cause of the collapse remains officially unstated, but residents of the town have said they suspect poor-quality construction as a cause.

The school had previously experienced a partial collapse in 2000, but it was rebuilt. After the first collapse, neighbors living downhill from the school abandoned their property out of fear that the building would fall onto their homes. The owner of the church-run school attempted to buy these vacated properties. In addition, the third floor of the building was under construction at the time of the 2008 collapse.

After the collapse, at least 200 people were seen at hospitals in and around Port-au-Prince. However, because of strikes at General Hospital and Hospital de la Paix, two hospitals in the town, Trinité Hospital and University of Haiti Hospital saw most of the injured.

=== Arrest ===
College La Promesse school owner, Rev. Fortin Augustin, Protestant minister and preacher, was arrested on November 8, 2008. He was charged with involuntary manslaughter and brought to a Haitian police station, after he allegedly told Haitian president René Préval that "the church school had been built with hardly any structural steel or cement to hold its concrete blocks together; he constructed the building all by himself, saying he didn't need an engineer as he had good knowledge of construction." He claimed to have the knowledge of construction and the word of God with him. Everywhere he went he had always tried to spread it, teaching people that the way that they are supposed to get through life is with the word of God in their hearts because that's really the only thing that can save when you are in a situation you can't get out of.

== Reaction and rescue operations ==
Haiti's neighbor, the Dominican Republic, sent two helicopters to assist in evacuating the injured. United Nations peacekeepers, stationed in the country since the 2004 coup d'état, assisted in the rescue efforts, as did members of the aid group Doctors Without Borders and the International Red Cross. The U.S. Agency for International Development sent a disaster response team to the school, and provided more logistical and rescue equipment. This consists of some 38 Virginia search-and-rescue officials and four rescue dogs, (led by Capt. Michael Istvan, operations chief for the Fairfax County Urban Search and Rescue team, flown by Alexandre Deprez, acting director for the U.S. Agency for International Development in Haiti). Also, a team of 15 Martinique firefighters and doctors, led by Daniel Vigee, and groups from Médecins sans Frontières and Haiti arrived to rescue the remaining trapped children.

Hilario Davide, Jr. reported that “Filipino Blue Berets were the first to arrive at the scene on November 7 and immediately went to action, using their bare hands to roll over concrete slabs and dig through the rubble in their bid to pull out both the living and the dead. 157 officers and enlisted personnel from the Philippine Army, Navy, and Air Force, as well as 13 other officers from the Philippine National Police, are serving with the United Nations Stabilization Mission in Haiti (MINUSTAH). The Filipinos were instrumental in the recovery of 9 victims who survived the tragedy.” The Filipino peace-keepers worked with blue helmets from Brazil, Chile, and Ecuador and Haitian police.

== Related incidents ==
Only five days after the Pétion-Ville school disaster, portions of Grace Divine School in Port-au-Prince also collapsed.
