= Deschapelles =

- Town
- Location in Haiti
- Coordinates: 19°05′0″N 72°30′0″W
- Country: Haiti
- Department: Artibonite
- Arrondissement: Saint-Marc
- Elevation: 236 ft (72 m)
- Climate: Aw

Deschapelles (French pronunciation: [deʃapɛl]; Haitian Creole: Dechpel) is a town in the Verrettes commune, in the Artibonite department of Haiti. It is located approximately 54 km north of the capital, Port-au-Prince, and has 4 to 5000 inhabitants Approximately. Deschapelles is where the Hôpital Albert Schweitzer Haiti is located.

== Education ==
Centre D'etudes Secondaire de Deschapelles (CESD)

Ecole Nationale du Borel

Ecole Mixte le Pelerin

Ecole Mixte Gerald

== Sister cities ==
- Essex, Connecticut, United States
