= Red River floods =

The Red River floods refer to the various flooding events in recent history of the Red River of the North, which forms the border between North Dakota and Minnesota and flows north, into Manitoba.

Around 16% of the Red River basin, excluding the Assiniboine basin, is located in Canada; the remainder is within The Dakotas and Minnesota.

== List of floods ==
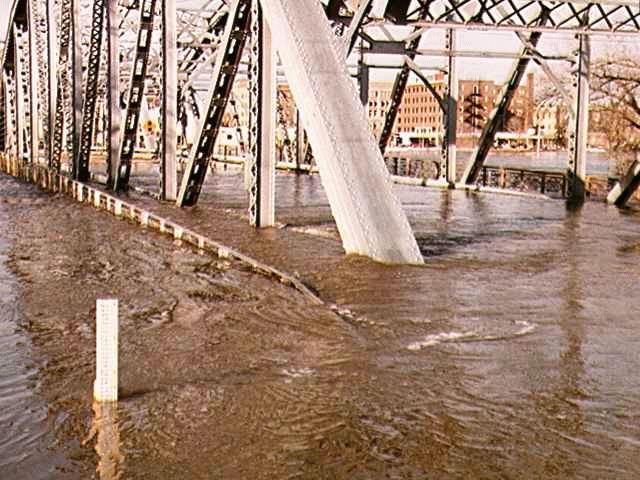
Sorlie Bridge, at Grand Forks, North Dakota, in 1997 flood

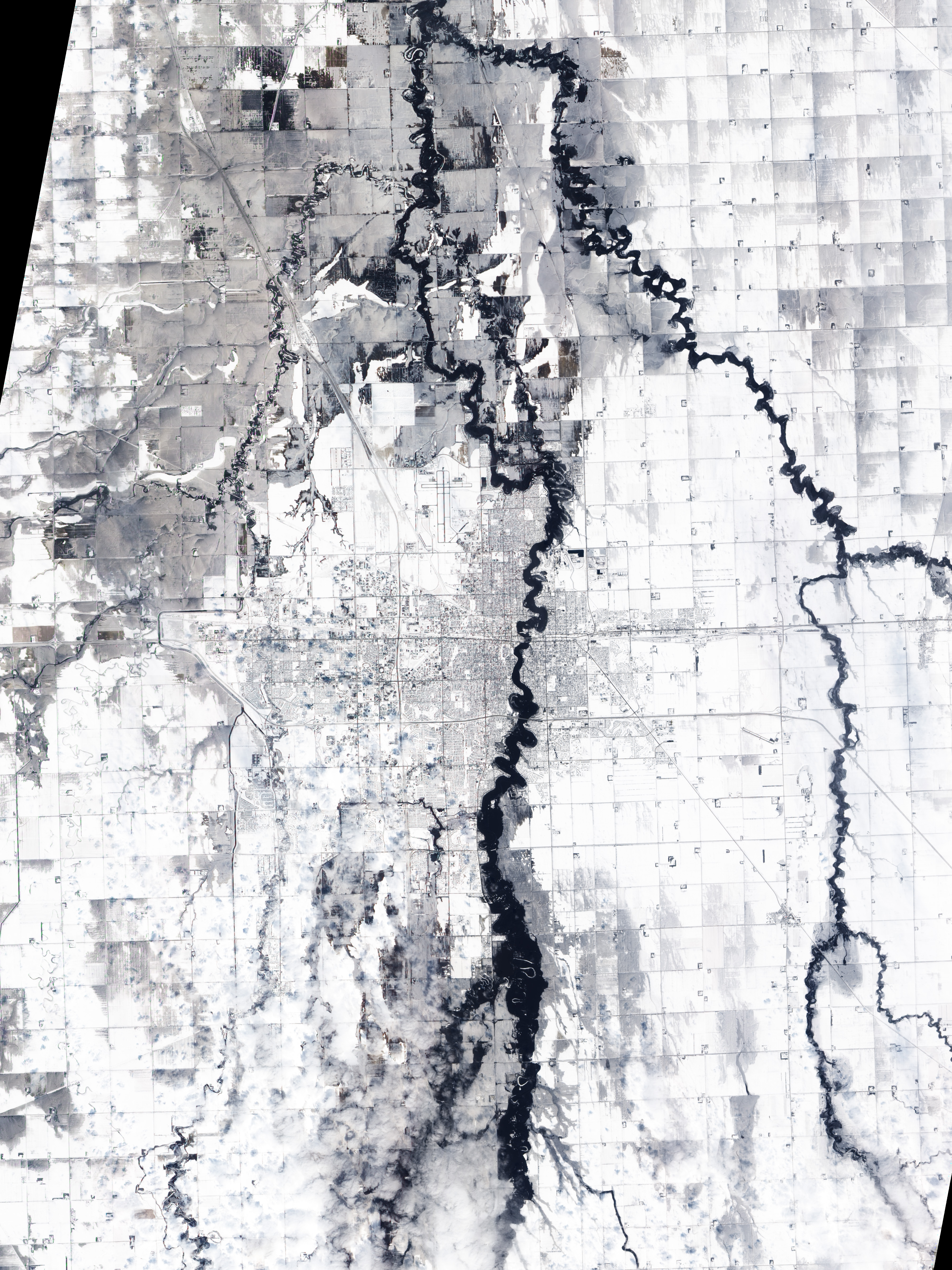
Aerial photo of Red River at Fargo, North Dakota, in 2009 flood

Notable floods include the:

- 1826 Red River flood — the largest known in the Red River Valley.
- 1852 Red River flood
- 1861 Red River flood
- 1882 Red River flood
- 1897 Red River flood
- 1916 Red River flood
- 1945 Red River flood
- 1950 Red River flood — the largest flood in the Red River Valley since 1861. Major flooding took place in Winnipeg and the Red River Valley in April, May, and June.
- 1966 Red River flood
- 1969 Red River flood
- 1970 Red River flood
- 1974 Red River flood
- 1978 Red River flood
- 1979 Red River flood — represented the first major test of the Red River Floodway.
- 1987 Red River flood
- 1989 Red River flood
- 1996 Red River flood
- 1997 Red River flood — most severe flood in Manitoba's Red River Valley since 1852.
  - 1997 Red River flood in the United States
- 1998 Red River flood
- 1999 Red River flood
- 2001 Red River flood
- 2006 Red River flood
- 2009 Red River flood — fourth highest flood on the Red River in Manitoba, since 1826.
- 2010 Red River flood
- 2011 Red River flood
- 2013 Red River flood
- 2015 Red River flood
