= Flood bypass =

Natural disaster prevention system

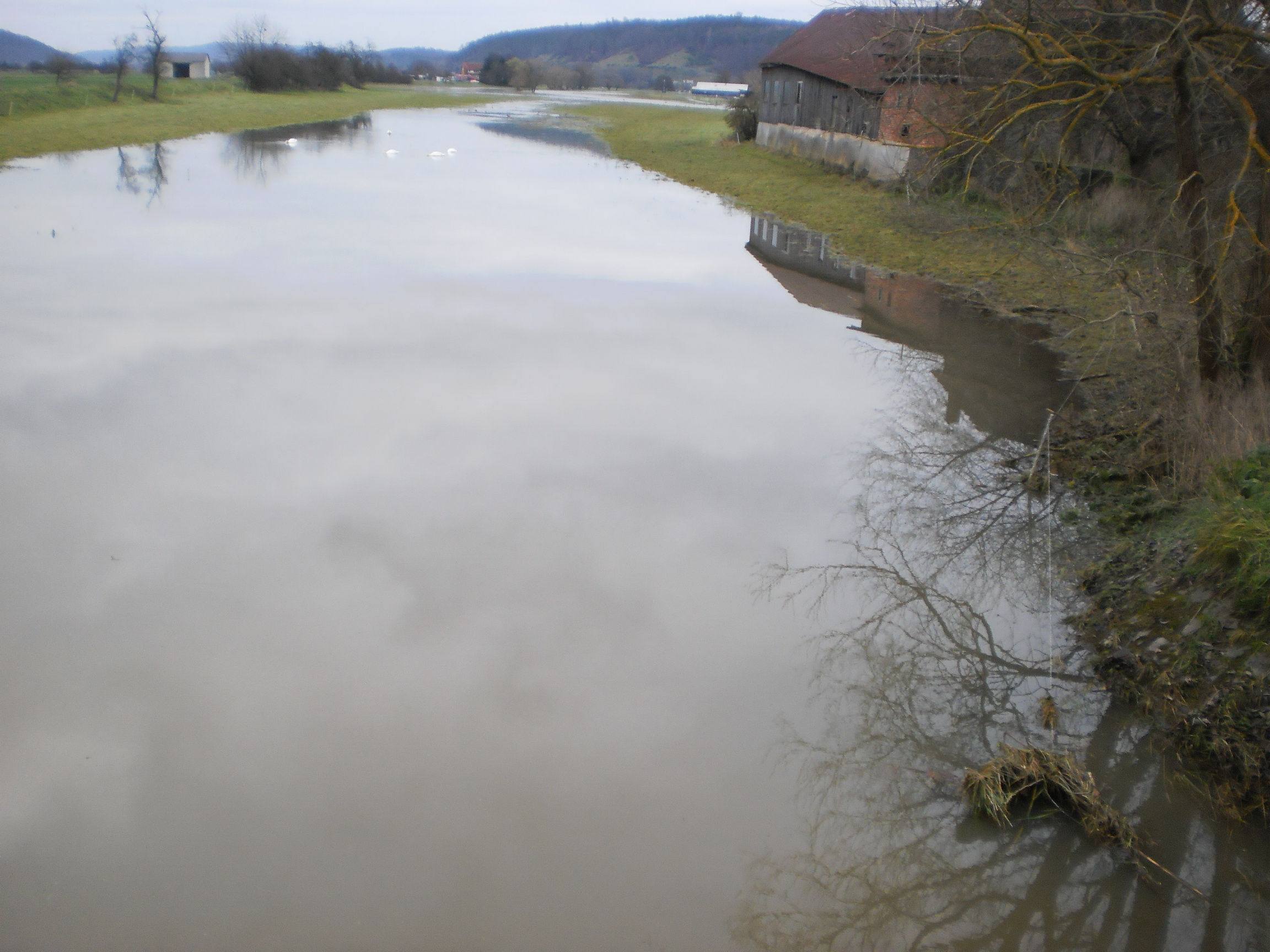
Bypass filled with nearly annual floods, floodbanks to avoid a flood plain in the village

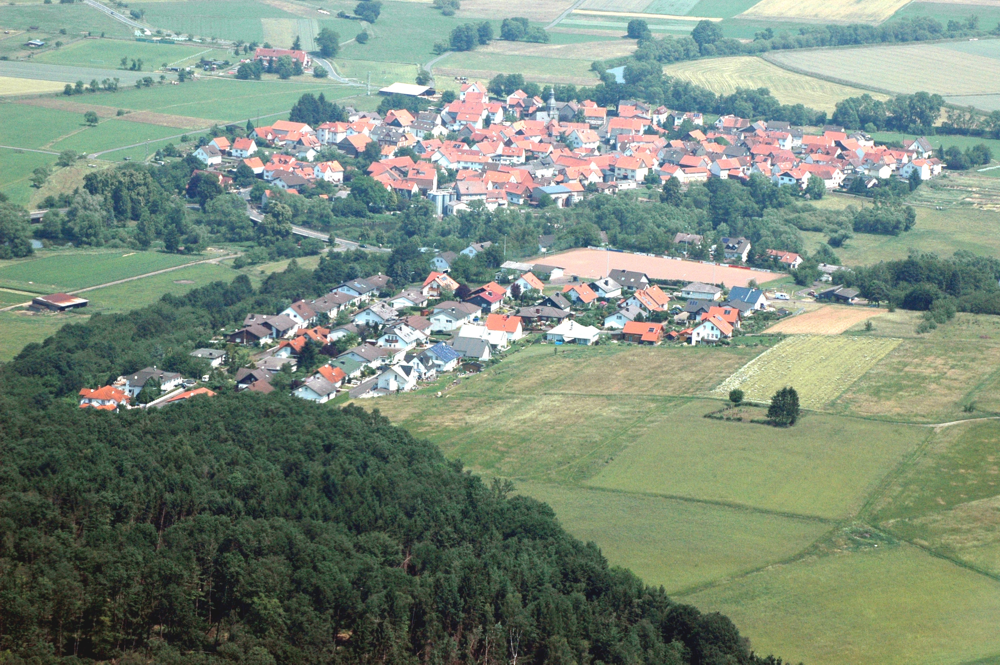
Without floods, the flood bypass (upper left corner) is dry land used for agriculture, river Lahn flows in a meander around the village Weimar Roth

A flood bypass is a region of land or a large man-made structure that is designed to convey excess flood waters from a river or stream in order to reduce the risk of flooding on the natural river or stream near a key point of interest, such as a city. Flood bypasses, sometimes called floodways, often have man-made diversion works, such as diversion weirs and spillways, at their head or point of origin. The main body of a flood bypass is often a natural flood plain. Many flood bypasses are designed to carry enough water such that combined flows down the original river or stream and flood bypass will not exceed the expected maximum flood flow of the river or stream.

Flood bypasses are typically used only during major floods and act in a similar nature to a detention basin. Since the area of a flood bypass is significantly larger than the cross-sectional area of the original river or stream channel from which water is diverted, the velocity of water in a flood bypass will be significantly lower than the velocity of the flood water in the original system. These low velocities often cause increased sediment deposition in the flood bypass, thus it is important to incorporate a maintenance program for the entire flood bypass system when it is not being actively used during a flood operation.

When not being used to convey water, flood bypasses are sometimes used for agricultural or environmental purposes. The land is often owned by a public authority and then rented to farmers or ranchers, who in turn plant crops or herd livestock that feed off the flood plain. Since the flood bypass is subjected to sedimentation during flood events, the land is often very productive and even a loss of crops due to flooding can sometimes be recovered due to the high yield of the land during the non-flood periods.

== Examples ==
- Bonnet Carré Spillway
- Eastside Bypass
- Fargo-Moorhead Area Diversion Project
- Yolo Bypass
