= Fargo–Moorhead Area Diversion Project =

Flood control project on the Red River in the US

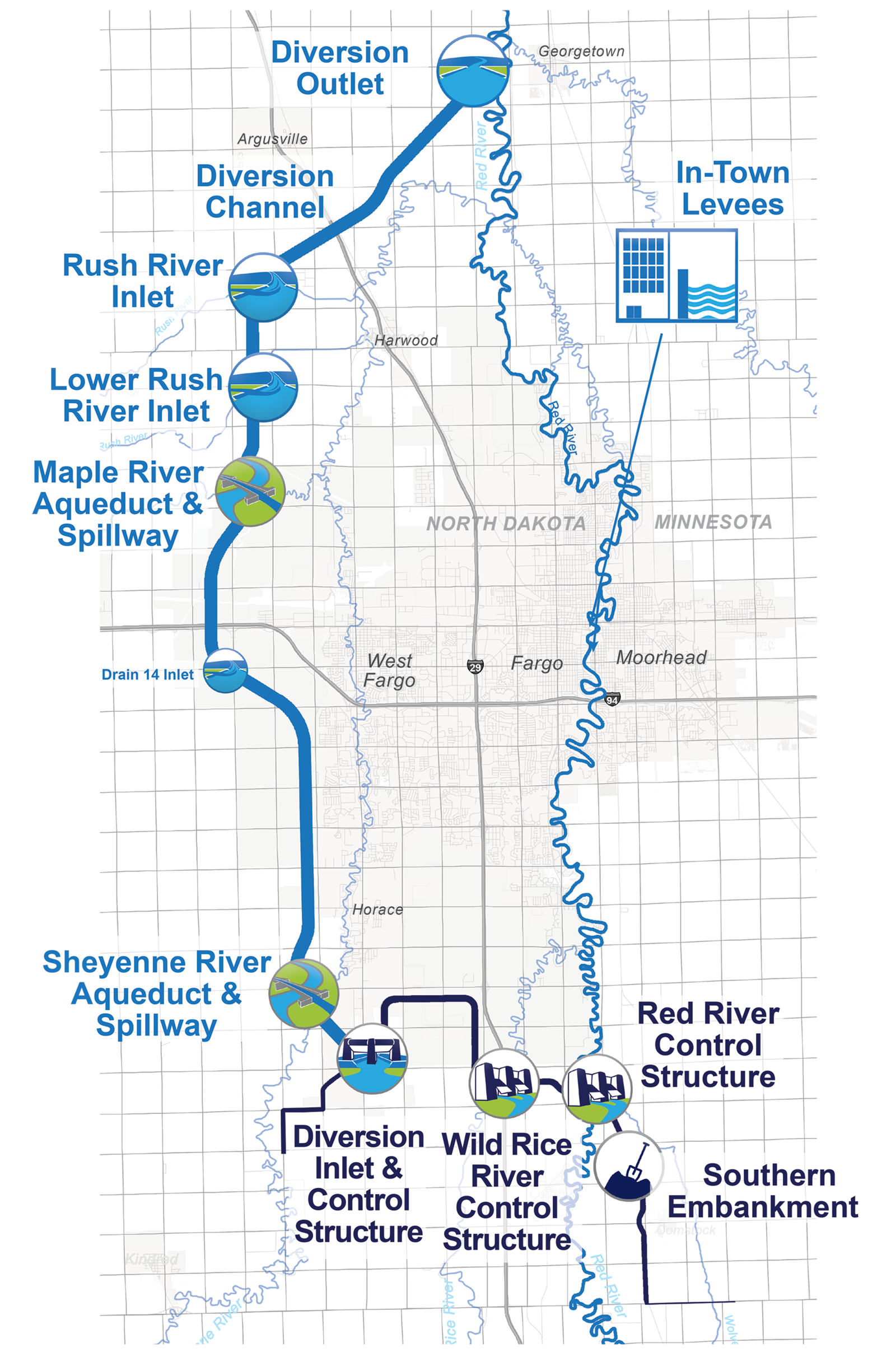
A map of the FM Area Diversion Project.

The Fargo–Moorhead (FM) Area Diversion project, officially known as the Fargo–Moorhead Metropolitan Area Diversion Flood Risk Management Project, is a large, regional flood control infrastructure project on the Red River of the North, which forms the border between North Dakota and Minnesota and flows north to Lake Winnipeg in Manitoba, Canada.

The Red River has flooded the Red River Valley numerous times since the late 1800s, and eight of the top ten floods have occurred since 1989. When it is ready to operate in 2027, the roughly $3.2-billion project will protect more than 273,000 people in the Fargo–Moorhead metropolitan area from catastrophic flooding. Ultimately, it also will free residents and businesses from the need for flood insurance once the project is certified by the Federal Emergency Management Agency (FEMA).

The project includes a 30-mile (48-kilometer) stormwater diversion channel that extends from just south of Horace, ND, to north of Argusville, ND (across from Georgetown, MN). It also incorporates a 22-mile (35-kilometer) earthen embankment south of the city of Fargo, two first-of-their-kind aqueducts to enable fish passage across the channel, three gated structures to control water flows, and a variety of road and railroad crossings, road-grade raises, floodwalls, levees, stormwater lift stations, channel inlets, wetland restoration acreage, and mitigation projects.

The project was authorized for construction by the Water Resources Reform and Development Act of 2014. The design and construction are being done using a split-delivery model, with the US Army Corps of Engineers and its non-federal sponsors completing different parts of the project simultaneously. A Project Partnership Agreement pairs the Corps of Engineers with the project's non-federal sponsors—the Metro Flood Diversion Authority, City of Fargo, ND, and City of Moorhead, MN. The Metro Flood Diversion Authority, a permanent North Dakota political subdivision, oversees the non-federal work, which includes a public-private partnership (P3) for the stormwater diversion channel and its associated infrastructure. The project is the first P3 ever done in conjunction with the US Army Corps of Engineers and is a pilot project for the split-delivery model nationwide. It is also the first P3 water management project in North America, and the first green finance initiative in the United States specifically designed for climate change adaptation.

Under the project agreements, the US Army Corps of Engineers is designing and constructing the southern embankment, water-control structures, and associated infrastructure. The non-federal sponsors, in turn, will design, finance, construct, operate, and maintain the stormwater diversion channel, aqueducts, numerous road and railroad crossings, and in-town work, including levees, floodwalls, and stormwater lift stations. Numerous mitigation projects involving wetlands, native plantings, and fish passage have been incorporated in the project.

== Public-Private Partnership ==
The Red River Valley Alliance, a private, international consortium of builders consisting of ACCIONA, Shikun & Binui USA, and North American Construction Group, serves as the public-private partnership (P3) developer, and its design and construction arm is ASN Constructors.

Under the P3 model adopted by the MFDA, the RRVA has taken responsibility for pre-financing the entire portion of its construction work until it is completed and turned over for operation. The agreement provides for milestone payments throughout construction as well as for RRVA taking on the project's operation and maintenance for 30 years after its completion.

== History ==
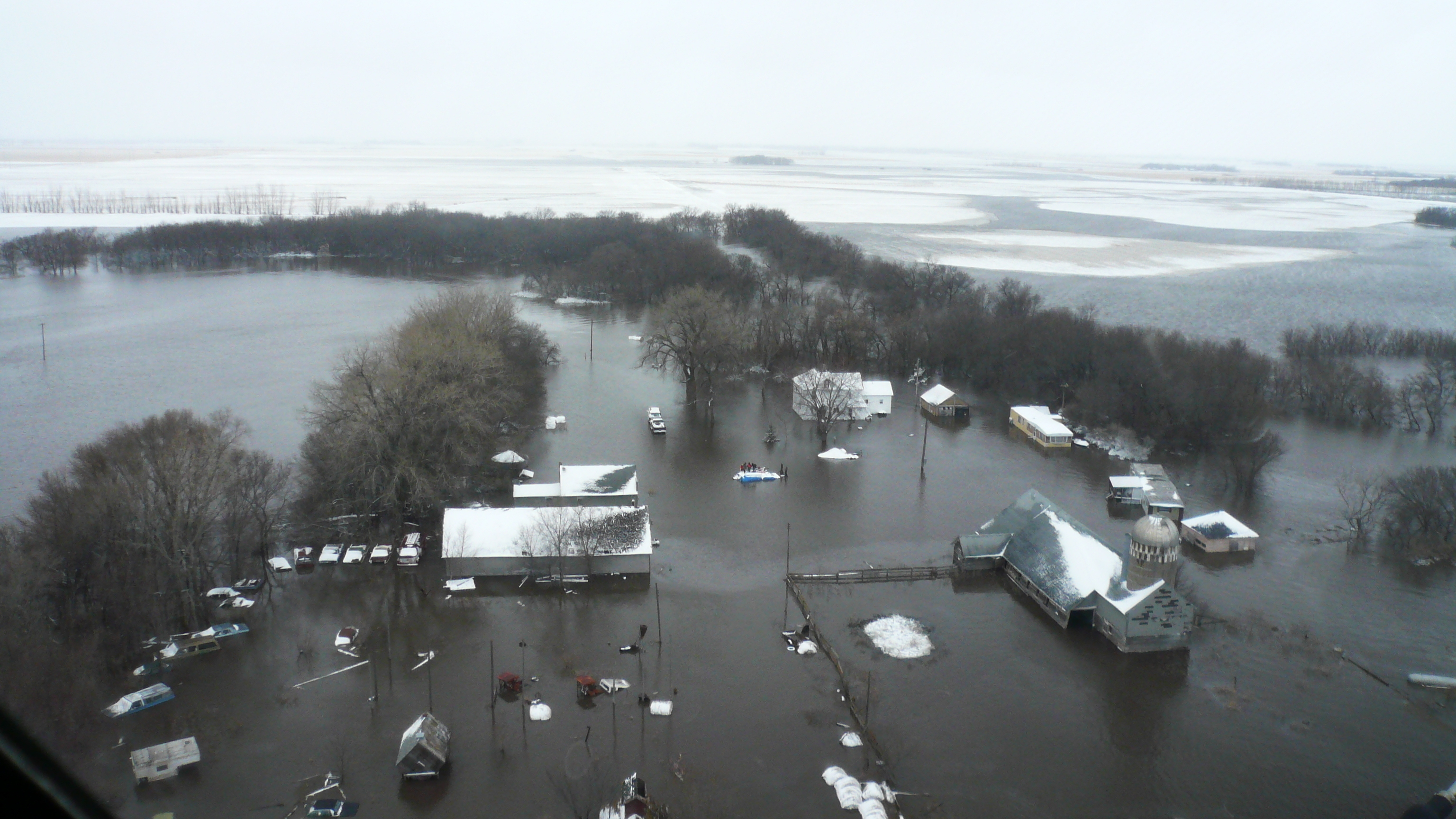
Flooding in Fargo in 2009.

The Red River has flooded the Fargo–Moorhead area numerous times, with the most recent significant flood events being the 1997 Red River flood, the 2009 Red River flood, and the 2011 Red River flood.

Several tributaries along the Red River also flood and cause damage in the Fargo–Moorhead area, including the Wild Rice River, Sheyenne River, Maple River, Rush River, and Lower Rush River.

The Red River routinely exceeds the National Weather Service flood stage of 18 feet (5.5 m) at the United States Geological Survey gauge in Fargo (Fargo gauge). As of 2023, the Red River had reached this stage in 60 of the previous 124 years (1902 through 2023), and in every year except 2012, 2016, and 2021 from 1993 through 2013.

The US Army Corps of Engineers conducted a feasibility study for flood protection in the Fargo–Moorhead area in September 2008, with the initial Draft Feasibility Report and Environmental Impact Statement published in 2010. The goals of the study were to find a plan that reduced flood risk and damages to the Fargo–Moorhead area, restored or improved habitat along the rivers in the area, and provided additional wetland habitat and recreational opportunities with flood risk management features.

The initial study looked at multiple alternatives that could reduce flooding, including no action (continuing to use emergency measures and sand bags), nonstructural measures, and the construction of flood barriers and levees, diversion channels, and flood storage.

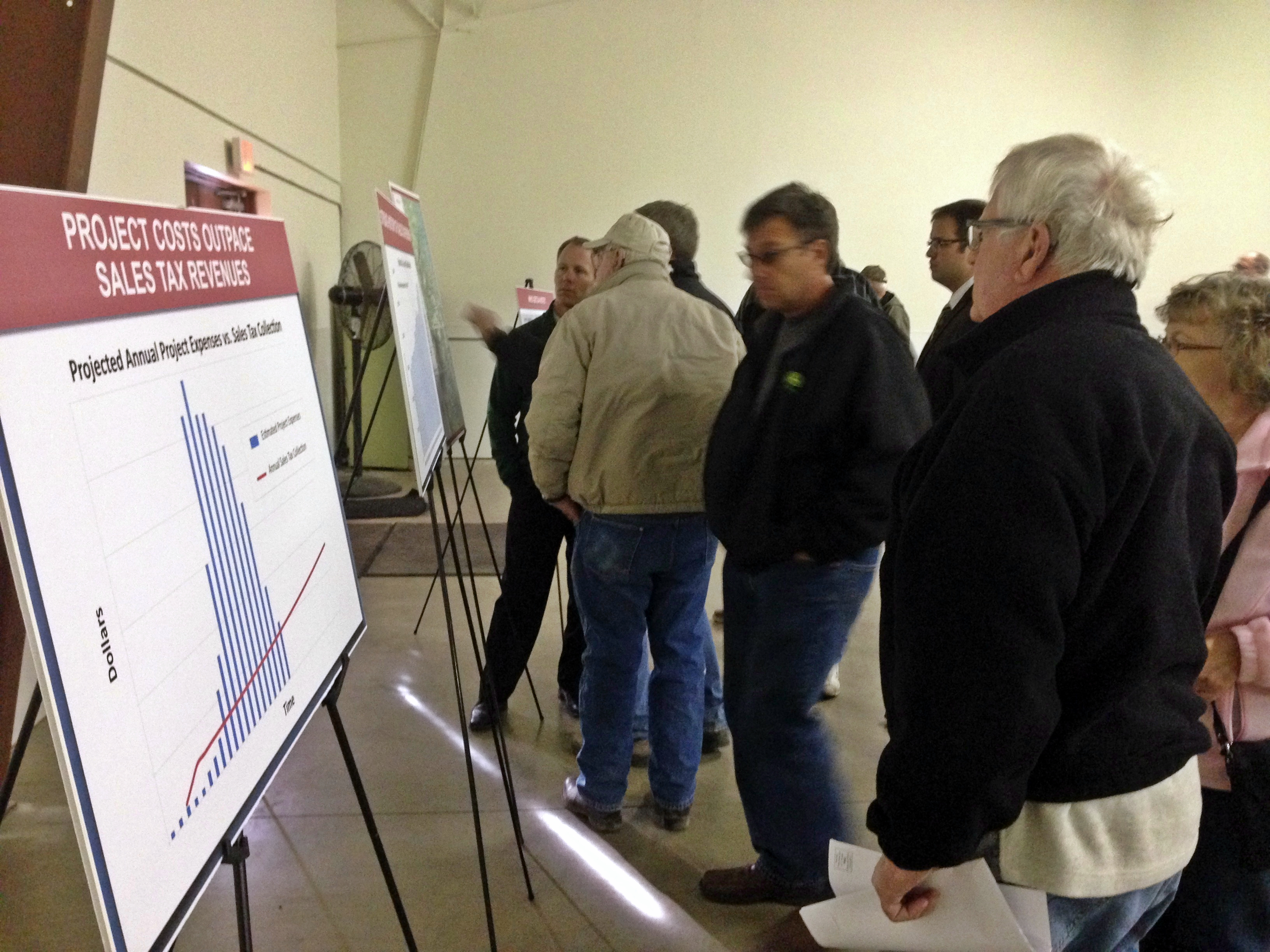
Attendees at a public meeting about the FM Area Diversion Project look at a posterboard about projected project expenses.

Two diversion concepts were carried forward at the end of the study, including a diversion channel in Minnesota and a diversion channel in North Dakota. However, in 2016, the Minnesota Department of Natural Resources denied a permit for the project.

In October 2017, North Dakota Governor Doug Burgum and then-Minnesota Governor Mark Dayton created a joint task force to develop engineering options to address the Minnesota DNR's concerns about the project's impacts. The Metro Flood Diversion Authority submitted its Plan B proposal following the work of the Governors' Task Force, which changed the alignment of the embankment and also allowed more water to flow through the Fargo–Moorhead area during project operation.

== Economics ==
The FM Area Diversion project is intended to protect the FM-area economy, which generated a gross regional product of $16.8 billion in 2021. It is being funded and financed through federal, state, and local sources.

The project received $750 million from the federal government, which includes $437 million from the Infrastructure Investment and Jobs Act. North Dakota allocated $850 million to the project, and Minnesota contributed $135 million. Local sales taxes approved by voters in Fargo and Cass County, ND, will generate an anticipated $1.2 billion to pay long-term debt service.

The project also locked in low-interest loans, including a federally subsidized $569 million loan for 2.08% interest from the United States Environmental Protection Agency, $55 million in State Revolving Fund loans from the North Dakota Public Finance Agency, and $280 million in US Department of Transportation Private Activity Bonds.

== Design ==
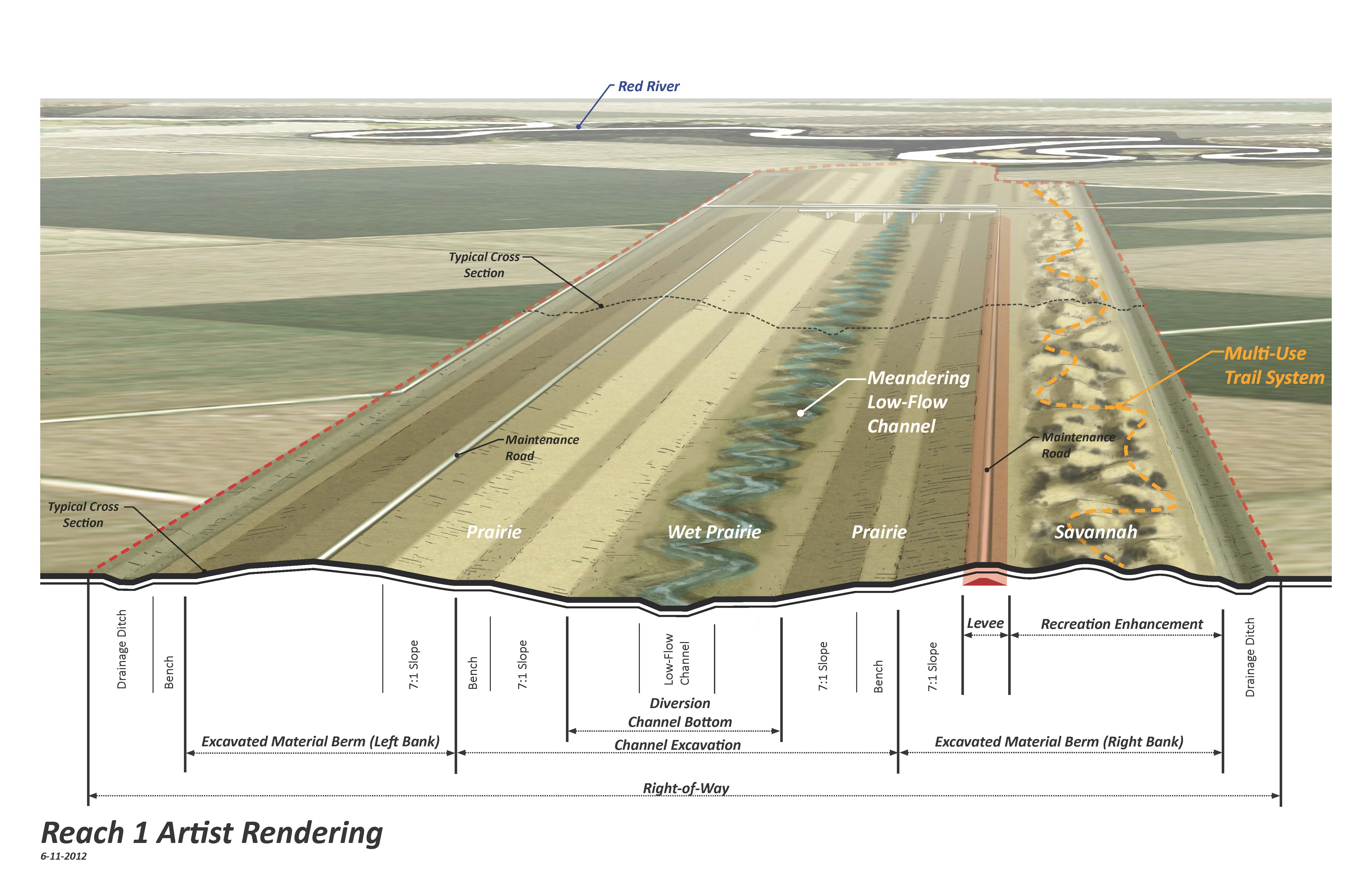
A rendering of what the channel portion of the FM Area Diversion Project may look like.

The FM Area Diversion project includes multiple components in four key areas that, together, will protect the community from flooding by 2027. It is designed to withstand a 100-year flood and provide fightable protection for a 500-year flood.

Stormwater Diversion Channel and Associated Infrastructure

The Stormwater Diversion Channel and Associated Infrastructure section of the FM Area Diversion project includes a 30-mile (48-kilometre) stormwater diversion channel that will route water around the metro area, a diversion outlet, aqueducts on the Maple and Sheyenne rivers, fourteen drainage inlets tied to the channel, three railroad crossings, two interstate highway crossings, and 12 county road crossings. It is being built by ASN Constructors.

Southern Embankment and Associated Infrastructure

The Southern Embankment and Associated Infrastructure portion of the FM Area Diversion project includes a 22-mile (35-kilometer) earthen embankment, road raises, bridge crossings, and three gated structures. The structures have large, radial-arm tainter gates that will open or close to control floodwater levels during times of extreme flooding. The gates tie into the southern embankment, behind which floodwaters will be held in an upstream staging area of nearly 30,000 acres (120 km^{2}). Once collected in the staging area, floodwaters would then be routed through the Diversion Inlet Structure into the stormwater diversion channel and away from the metro area. The US Army Corps of Engineers contractors are building these portions.

Mitigation Features & Associated Infrastructure

As part of the overall project, the US Army Corps of Engineers and Metro Flood Diversion Authority are implementing a number of mitigation projects. Among these are funding or constructing levees in nearby communities, completing wetland restoration projects, and acquiring flowage easements for properties that will be impacted when the FM Area Diversion project operates.

Local Entity Flood Protection and Associated Infrastructure

City and county governments are working on in-town protection measures that include levees, floodwalls, stormwater lift stations, road improvements, and grade raises.

== Similar projects ==
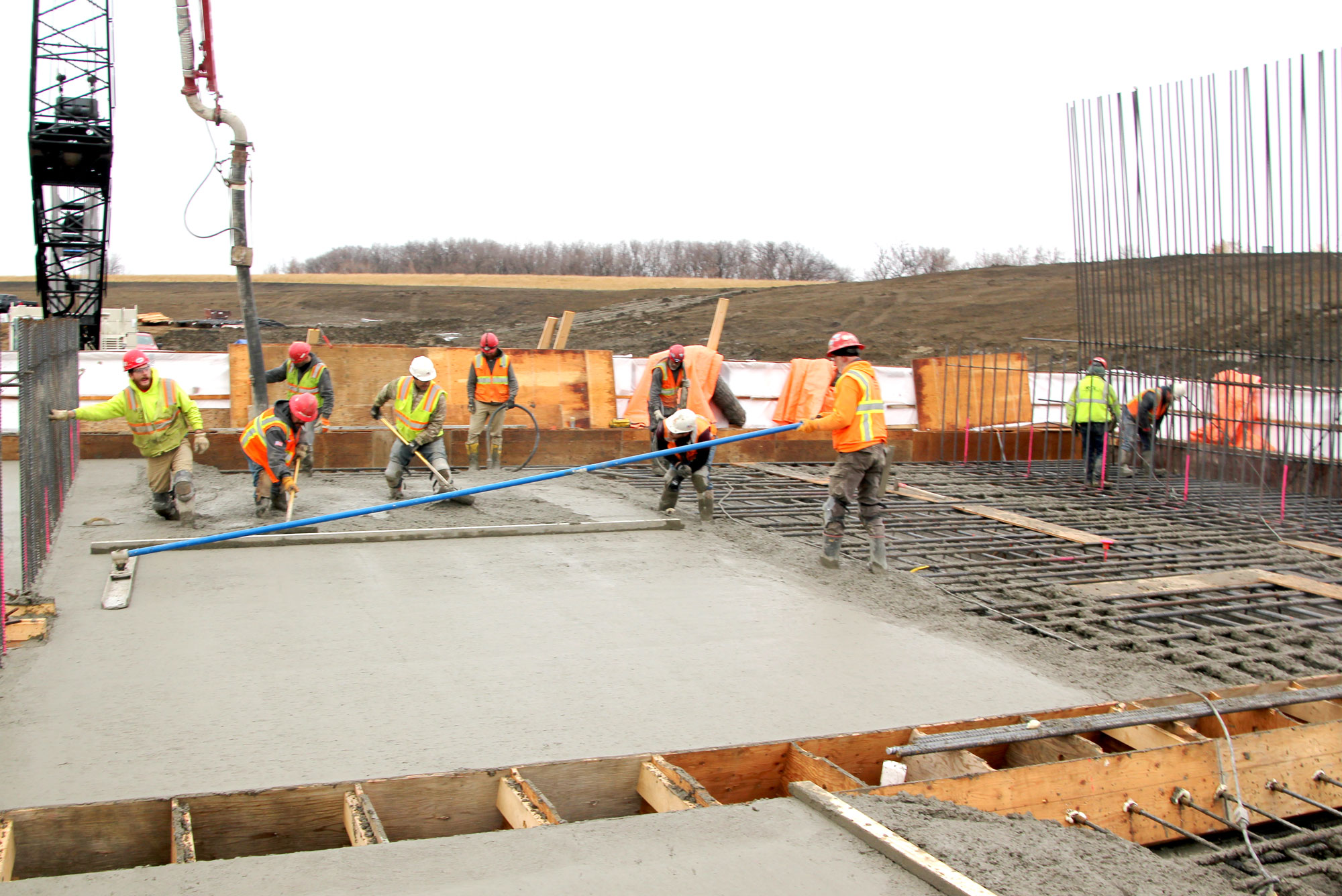
Contractors working at the Wild Rice River Control Structure south of Fargo, ND.

- The city of Winnipeg built the Red River Floodway in the 1960s to protect the city from the Red River. The project includes a diversion channel around the east of Winnipeg and cost an estimated $63 Million (CAD), approximately $360 million today. To date, the Floodway has been used more than 20 times and prevented more than $100 billion (CAD) in cumulative flood damages.
- The Shellmouth Reservoir is on the Assiniboine River in Manitoba and Saskatchewan, Canada. The Shellmouth Dam was built in the late 1960s and the outflow is controlled by a gated structure. The project protects the city of Winnipeg from flooding from the Assiniboine River.
- The Portage Diversion project, also known as the Assiniboine River Floodway, is near Portage la Prairie, Manitoba. It includes a 29-kilometre-long (18-mile) diversion channel that drains directly into Lake Manitoba and prevents flooding downriver in Winnipeg. The project was built at a cost of $20.5 million in 1970.
- The US Army Corps of Engineers built the Worcester Diversion Project in 1957 to protect the towns of Auburn and Millbury. The project was completed in 1960 at a cost of $5.2 million. The 11,300-foot (3,400-meter) open diversion channel allows potential floodwaters to go around Worcester and flow into the Blackstone River. The project also includes a control dam.
- The W. Darcy McKeough Floodway is meant to reduce the threat of flooding for Wallaceburg, Ontario. The project includes a dam embankment, and a concrete control structure with two gates. The diversion channel is seven kilometres long and diverts water into the St. Clair River.
