= Red River of the North =

River in the United States and Canada

Red River of the North Rivière Rouge / rivière Rouge du Nord
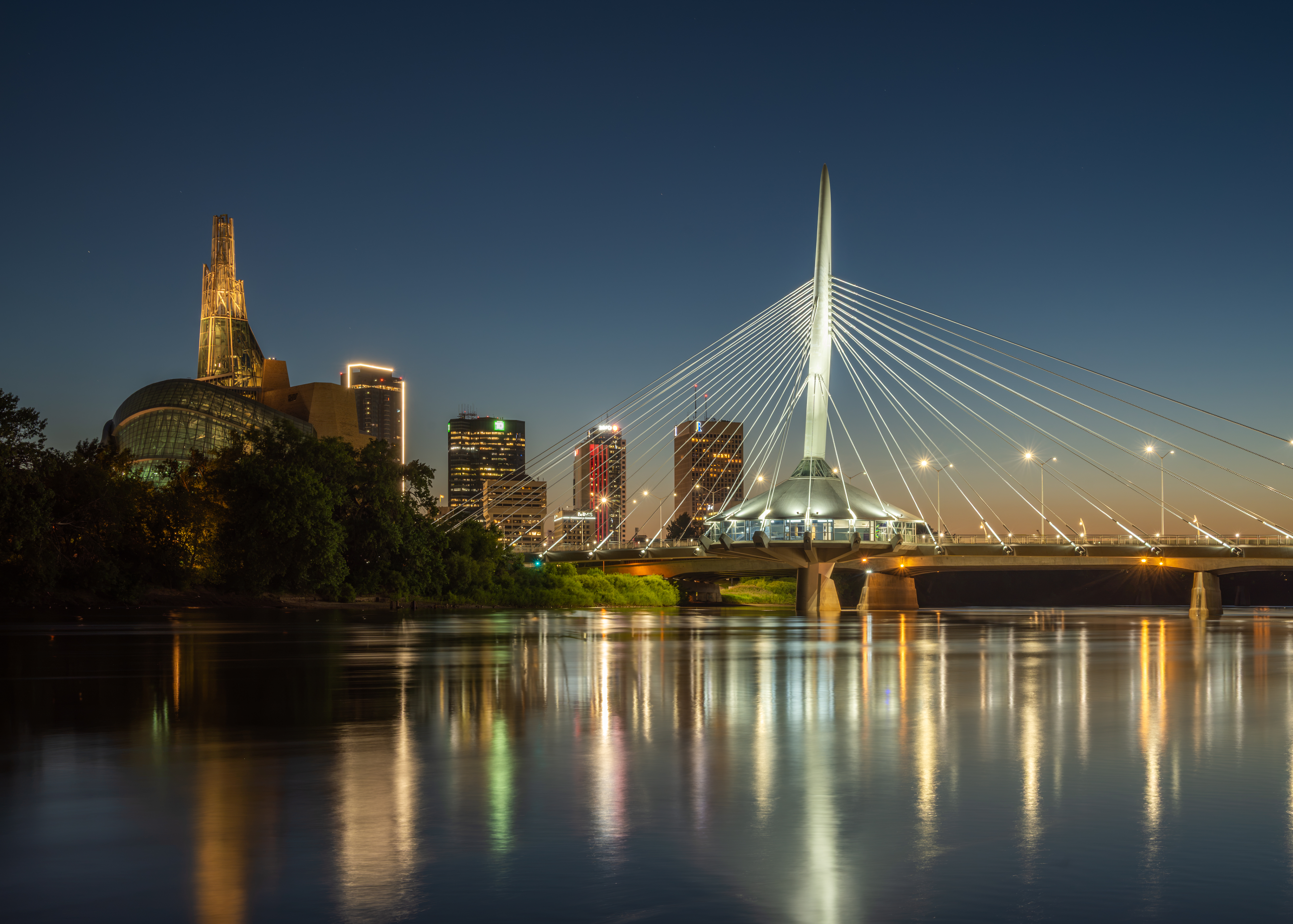
- The Red River in Winnipeg, Manitoba, the largest city on the river

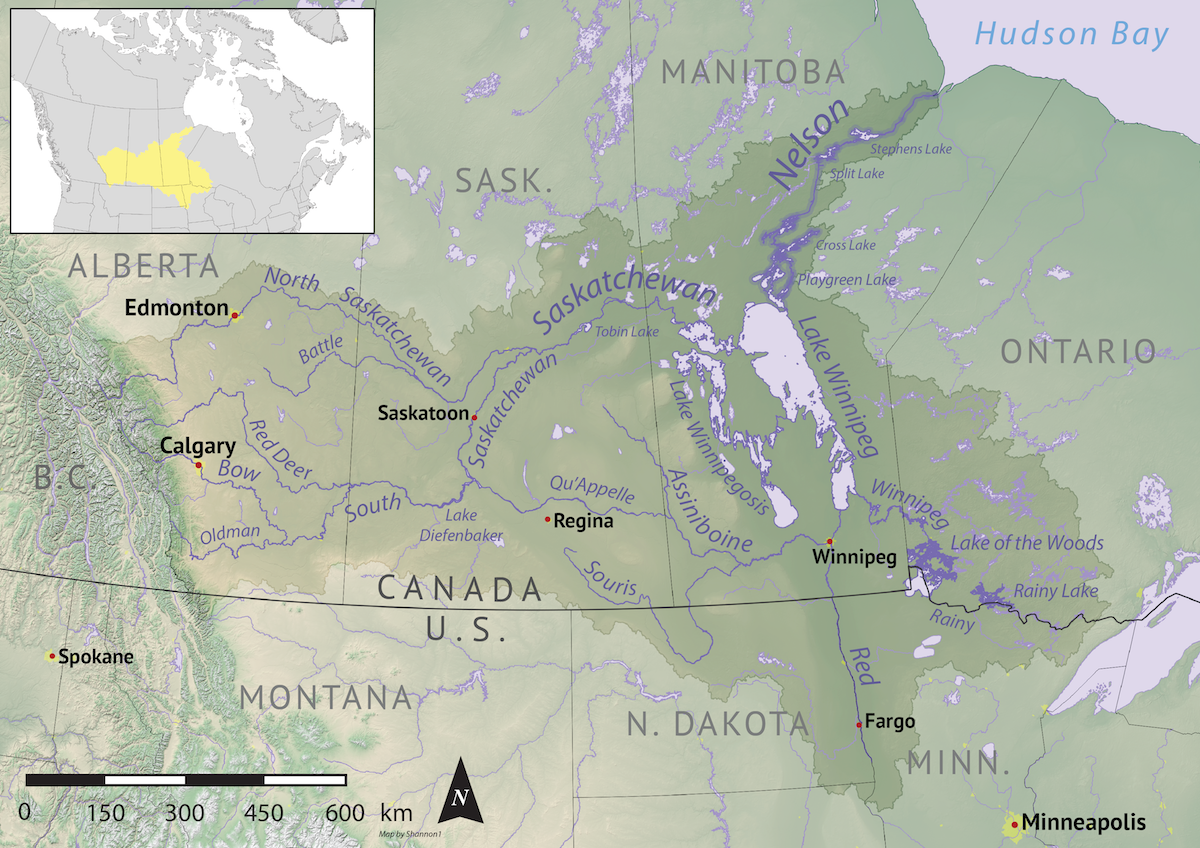
- Nelson River drainage basin

- River's mouth Red River of the North (Canada)

Location
- Countries: United States; Canada
- States: Minnesota; North Dakota
- Province: Manitoba
- Cities: Fargo, North Dakota; Moorhead, Minnesota; Grand Forks, North Dakota; East Grand Forks, Minnesota; Winnipeg, Manitoba; Selkirk, Manitoba

Physical characteristics
- Source: Confluence of Bois de Sioux and Otter Tail Rivers
  - location: Wahpeton, North Dakota
  - coordinates: 46°15′52″N 96°35′55″W
  - elevation: 948 ft (289 m)
- Mouth: Lake Winnipeg
  - coordinates: 50°23′47″N 96°48′39″W
  - elevation: 712 ft (217 m)
- Length: 550 mi (890 km)
- Basin size: 111,004 sq mi (287,500 km^{2})
- Discharge
  - location: Lockport, Manitoba, 20 miles (32 km) above the mouth
  - average: 8,617 cu ft/s (244.0 m^{3}/s)
  - minimum: 491 cu ft/s (13.9 m^{3}/s)
  - maximum: 152,900 cu ft/s (4,330 m^{3}/s)

Basin features
- Progression: Lake Winnipeg → Nelson River → Hudson Bay
- River system: Nelson River
- Tributaries
  - left: Bois de Sioux River; Wild Rice River (North Dakota); Sheyenne River, Elm River; Turtle River; Pembina River; Assiniboine River
  - right: Otter Tail River; Buffalo River; Wild Rice River; Red Lake River; Roseau River; Seine River

The Red River (French: rivière Rouge), also called the Red River of the North (French: rivière Rouge du Nord) to differentiate it from the Red River in the south of the continent, is a river in the north-central United States and the Canadian Prairies. Originating at the confluence of the Bois de Sioux and Otter Tail rivers between the U.S. states of Minnesota and North Dakota, it flows northward through the Red River Valley, forming most of the border of Minnesota and North Dakota and continuing into Manitoba. It empties into Lake Winnipeg, whose waters join the Nelson River and ultimately flow into Hudson Bay.

The Red River is about 885 kilometres (550 mi) long, of which about 635 kilometres (395 mi) are in the United States and about 255 kilometres (158 mi) are in Canada. The river falls 70 metres (230 ft) on its trip to Lake Winnipeg, where it spreads into the vast deltaic wetland known as Netley Marsh. Several urban areas have developed on both sides of the river, including the city of Winnipeg in Canada, as well as the Fargo-Moorhead and Grand Forks–East Grand Forks metropolitan areas, both of which straddle the North Dakota–Minnesota border. Long an important highway for trade, the Red River has been designated a Canadian Heritage River.

== History ==
The watershed of the Red River was part of Rupert's Land, the concession established by the British Hudson's Bay Company in north central North America. The Red was a key trade route for the company, and contributed to the settlement of British North America. The river was long used by fur traders, including the French and the Métis people, who established a community in this area some time before the British defeated France in the Seven Years' War. Following that, they took over French possessions in Canada. Settlers of the Red River Colony established farming along the river, and their primary settlement developed as Winnipeg, Manitoba. What became known as the Red River Trails, nineteenth-century oxcart trails developed originally by the Métis, supported the fur trade and these settlements. They contributed to further development of the region on both sides of the international border.

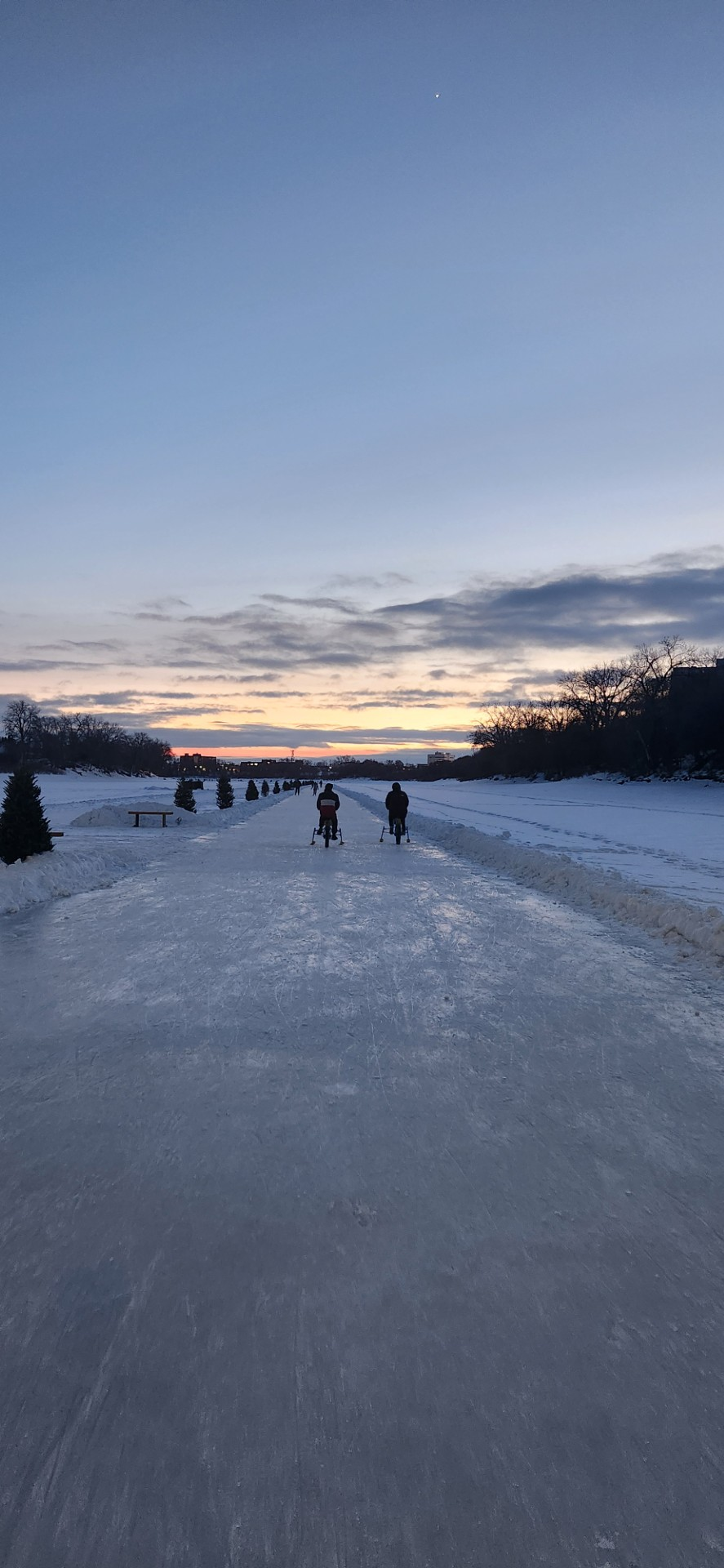
Skating trail on the Red River at sunset south of the Norwood Bridge, Winnipeg

== Geography ==
The Red River begins at the confluence of the Bois de Sioux and Otter Tail rivers, on the border of Wahpeton, North Dakota, and Breckenridge, Minnesota. Downstream, it is bordered by the twin cities of Fargo, North Dakota – Moorhead, Minnesota, and Grand Forks, North Dakota – East Grand Forks, Minnesota. It crosses the Canada–United States border just before reaching the town of Emerson, Manitoba. Manitoba's capital, Winnipeg, is at the Red's confluence with the Assiniboine River, at a point called The Forks. Together with the Assiniboine, the Red River fully encloses the endorheic basin of Devils Lake and Stump Lake.

The Red flows further north before draining into Lake Winnipeg, which then drains through the Nelson River into Hudson Bay, both part of the Hudson Bay watershed. The mouth of the Red River forms a freshwater river delta called the Netley–Libau Marsh. The Netley Marsh is west of the Red and the Libau Marsh is east, forming a 26,000-hectare (64,000-acre) wetland.

Southern Manitoba has a frost-free season of between 120 and 140 days per year in the Red River Valley.

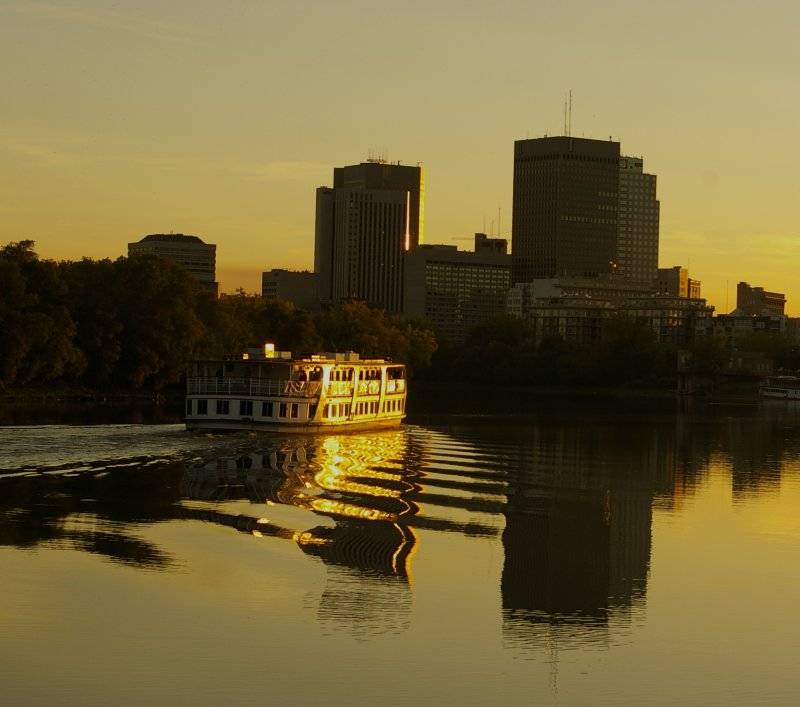
Red River in Winnipeg, Manitoba

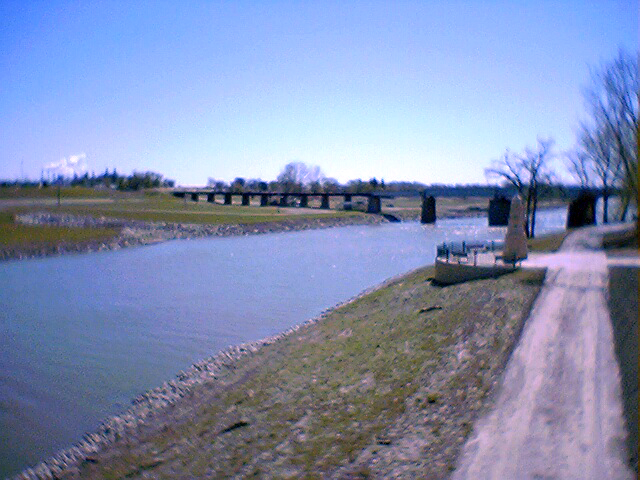
The Red River in Greater Grand Forks, as viewed from the Grand Forks side of the river

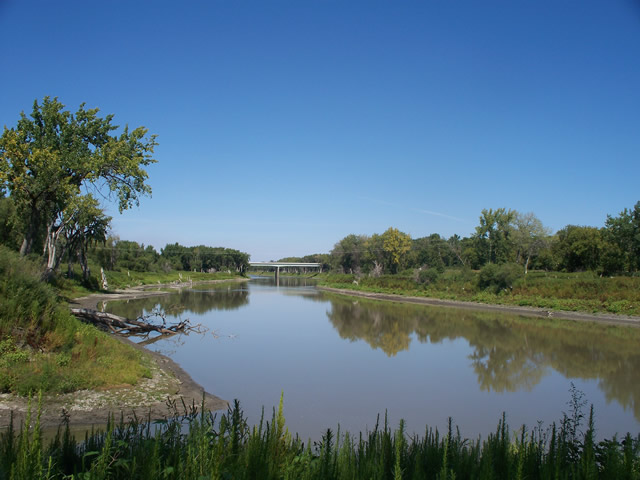
The Red River near Pembina, North Dakota, about 3 kilometres (2 mi) south of the Canada–U.S. border. The Pembina River can be seen flowing into the Red at the bottom.

== Geology ==
The Red River flows across the flat lake bed of the ancient glacial Lake Agassiz, an enormous glacial lake created at the end of the Wisconsin glaciation from meltwaters of the Laurentide Ice Sheet. As this continental glacier decayed, its meltwaters formed the lake. Over thousands of years, sediments precipitated to the bottom of the lakebed. These lacustrine soils are the parent soils of today's Red River Valley. The river is very young; it developed only after Lake Agassiz drained, about 9,500 years ago.

The word "valley" is a misnomer. While the Red River drains the region, it did not create a valley wider than a few hundred feet. The much wider floodplain is the lake bed of the ancient glacial lake. It is remarkably flat; from its origin near Breckenridge, Minnesota, to the international border near Emerson, Manitoba, its gradient is only about 1:5000 (1 metre per 5 kilometres), or approximately 1 foot per mile. The river, slow and small in most seasons, does not have the energy to cut a gorge. Instead it meanders across the silty bottomlands in its progress north. In consequence, high water has nowhere to go, except to spread across the old lakebed in "overland flooding". Heavy snows or rains, especially on saturated or frozen soil, have caused a number of catastrophic floods, which often are made worse by the fact that snowmelt starts in the warmer south, and waters flowing northward are often dammed or slowed by ice. These periodic floods have the effect of refilling, in part, the ancient lake.

== Floods ==
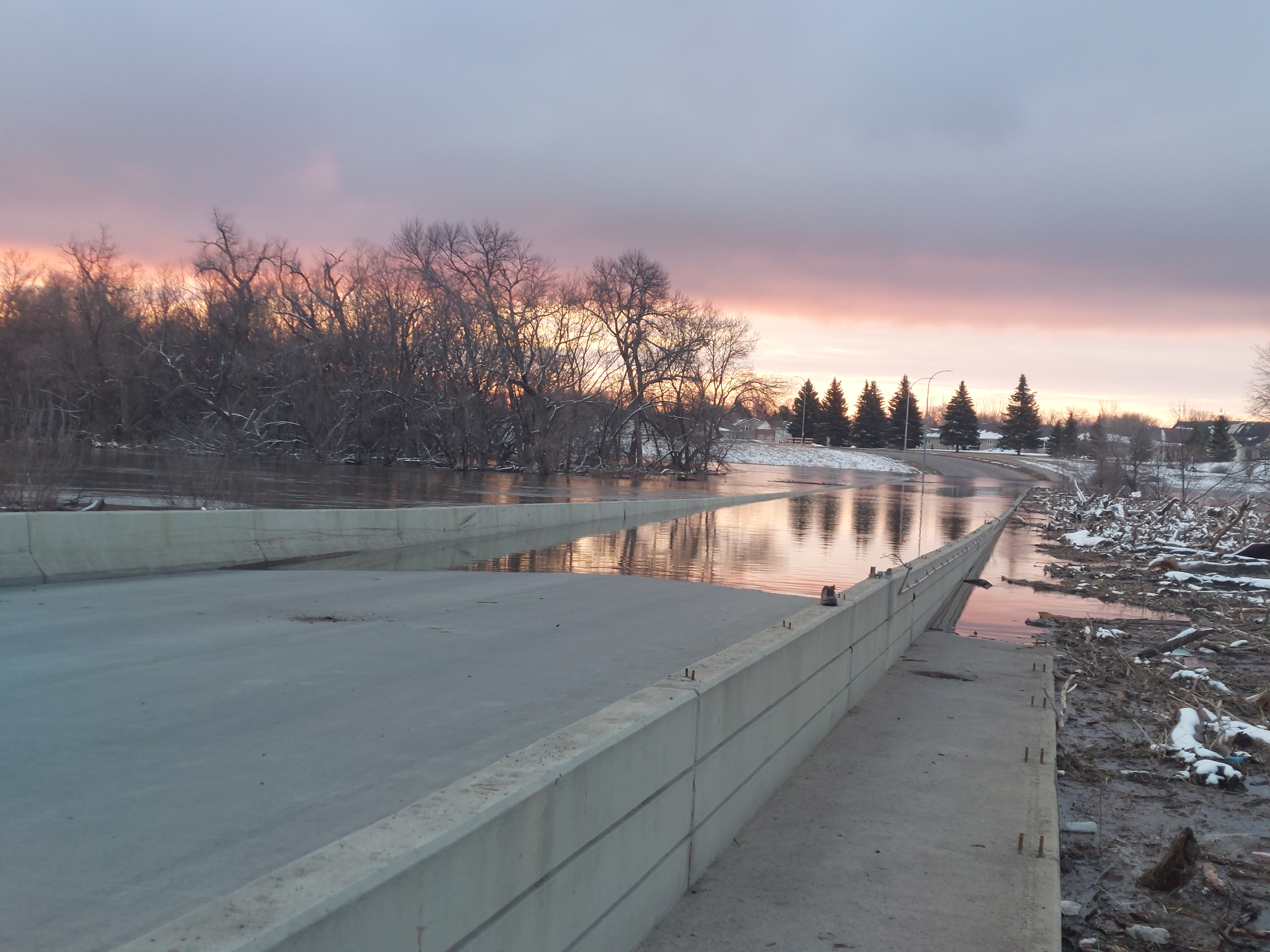
The Fargo-Moorhead "toll bridge" (a low-water crossing) during 2023 spring flood. The water level was at 29.5 ft (9.0 m), just below the threshold for a major flood.

Floods happen in the Red River when the water level increases over the tops of riverbanks due to significant precipitation over the same area for long periods, in the forms of persistent thunderstorms, rain, or snow combined with spring snow melt and ice jam. Major floods in historic times include those of 1826, 1897, 1950, 1997, 2009, 2011, and there has been significant flooding many years in between. Geologists have found evidence of many other floods in prehistoric times of equal or greater size. These "paleofloods" are known from their effects on local landforms, and have been the subject of scholarly studies. After the disastrous 1950 flood, which resulted in extensive property damage and losses in Winnipeg, the province of Manitoba undertook flood prevention by constructing the Red River Floodway. Completed in 1968, it diverts floodwaters around the city to less settled areas farther down the river. Grand Forks, North Dakota, and East Grand Forks, Minnesota, suffered widespread destruction in the flood of 1997. 75% of the population in the former city was evacuated, and all of the latter. Many of the residential areas along the rivers were inundated and all the homes had to be destroyed. Afterward, the massive Fargo–Moorhead Area Diversion Project was undertaken to protect both cities. Atashi et al. study conducted spatial analyses of the Permanent Water Area (PWA) and Seasonal Water Area (SWA), revealing a specific vulnerable section near Grafton city, located between Grand Forks and Emerson, that is highly susceptible to severe floods.

=== 1950 flood ===
On May 8, 1950, the Red River reached its highest level at Winnipeg since 1861. Eight dikes protecting Winnipeg gave way and flooded much of the city, turning 1,600 km^{2} (600 sq mi) of farmland into an enormous lake. The city turned to the Canadian Army and the Red Cross and The Salvation Army for help, and nearly 70,000 people were evacuated from their homes and businesses. Four of eleven bridges in the city were destroyed, and damage was estimated at between $900 million and $1 billion.

As a result of the floods, a flood control project was constructed to prevent such damage in the future. The Red River Floodway around Winnipeg attracted some derision at the time, as some people thought it was massively overbuilt and was the then-largest earth-moving project in the world. The project was completed under-budget, and has been used for at least some flood control 20 times in the 37 years from its completion to 2006. The Floodway has saved an estimated CA$10 billion in flood damages.

=== 1997 flood ===
In the spring of 1997 a major flood of the Red River caused a total of $3.5 billion in damage and required temporary evacuation of towns and cities on both sides of the border. The cities of Grand Forks, North Dakota, and East Grand Forks, Minnesota, suffered the most damage, and most of their populations had to be evacuated. The river crested at more than 54 feet (16 m) above datum.

The cities worked with FEMA and the state of Minnesota to clear the floodplains of the river on both sides, prohibiting future housing or businesses in this area. They created the Greater Grand Forks Greenway on both sides, which includes city and state parks, a long bike trail, and other recreational amenities. The trees and greenery help absorb floodwaters. A dike system was constructed outside this area on both sides to protect the cities from future floods. In East Grand Forks, a removable flood wall was constructed in the downtown area so that residents did not lose their connection to the river.

In Winnipeg, the flood crested at 24.5 feet (7.5 m) above datum at the James Avenue pumping station, making it the third-highest flood at Winnipeg in recorded history. It was surpassed by the floods of 1825, and 1826. The city was largely spared the fate of Grand Forks thanks to the Floodway, which was pushed to its capacity during the 1997 flood.

=== 2009 flood ===
In 2009 the Red River flooded in early spring. By Friday, March 27, the river at Fargo had reached the highest level in recorded history. Its discharge at that location was far in excess of normal flows. The river crested at the James Avenue pumping station in Winnipeg at 22.5 feet (6.9 m) above datum, making it the fourth-highest flood in recorded history.

=== 2011 flood ===
Due to a wet summer in 2010, as well as an above average amount of snowfall through the winter in the Red River Valley, the Red River spilled its banks. It crested in Winnipeg at the James Avenue pumping station at 19.59 feet (5.97 m) above datum, as the sixth highest flood levels in recorded history if flood protection such as the Portage Diversion and the Red River Floodway were not in place. That same year there was a surprise major flood on the Assiniboine River. In May 2011, a Manitoba-wide state of emergency was declared in the wake of a 300-year flood on the Assiniboine River at Brandon. Many residents had to be evacuated.

== Flow rates and flood potential ==
Below are the estimated, measured, and calculated peak flow rates of the Red River at various locations for the top ten floods of the Red River Valley, as measured at Winnipeg.

Location	1826 peak flow (cfs)	1852 peak flow (cfs)	1997 peak flow (cfs)	2009 peak flow (cfs)	1861 peak flow (cfs)	2011 peak flow (cfs)	1950 peak flow (cfs)	1979 peak flow (cfs)	1996 peak flow (cfs)	2006 peak flow (cfs)
Wahpeton-Breckenridge	–	–	12,800	15,400	–	10,240	–	7,050	–	10,720
Fargo-Moorhead	–	–	28,000	29,500	–	26,200	–	17,300	–	19,900
Grand Forks-East Grand Forks	135,000	95,000	114,000	76,700	65,000	86,100	54,000	82,000	58,100	72,800
Emerson/Pembina	151,000	–	133,000	87,900	–	84,700	95,500	92,700	66,700	73,500
Winnipeg	225,000	165,000	163,000	128,000	125,000	116,000	108,000	108,000	108,000	99,000

== See also ==
- List of longest rivers of Canada
- List of longest rivers of the United States (by main stem)
- List of longest streams of Minnesota
- List of rivers of Manitoba
- List of rivers of Minnesota
- List of rivers of the United States
- Red River Floodway
- Nestaweya River Trail
