= Red River Floodway =

Artificial flood control channel in Manitoba, Canada

Coordinates: 50.090005°N 96.934079°W

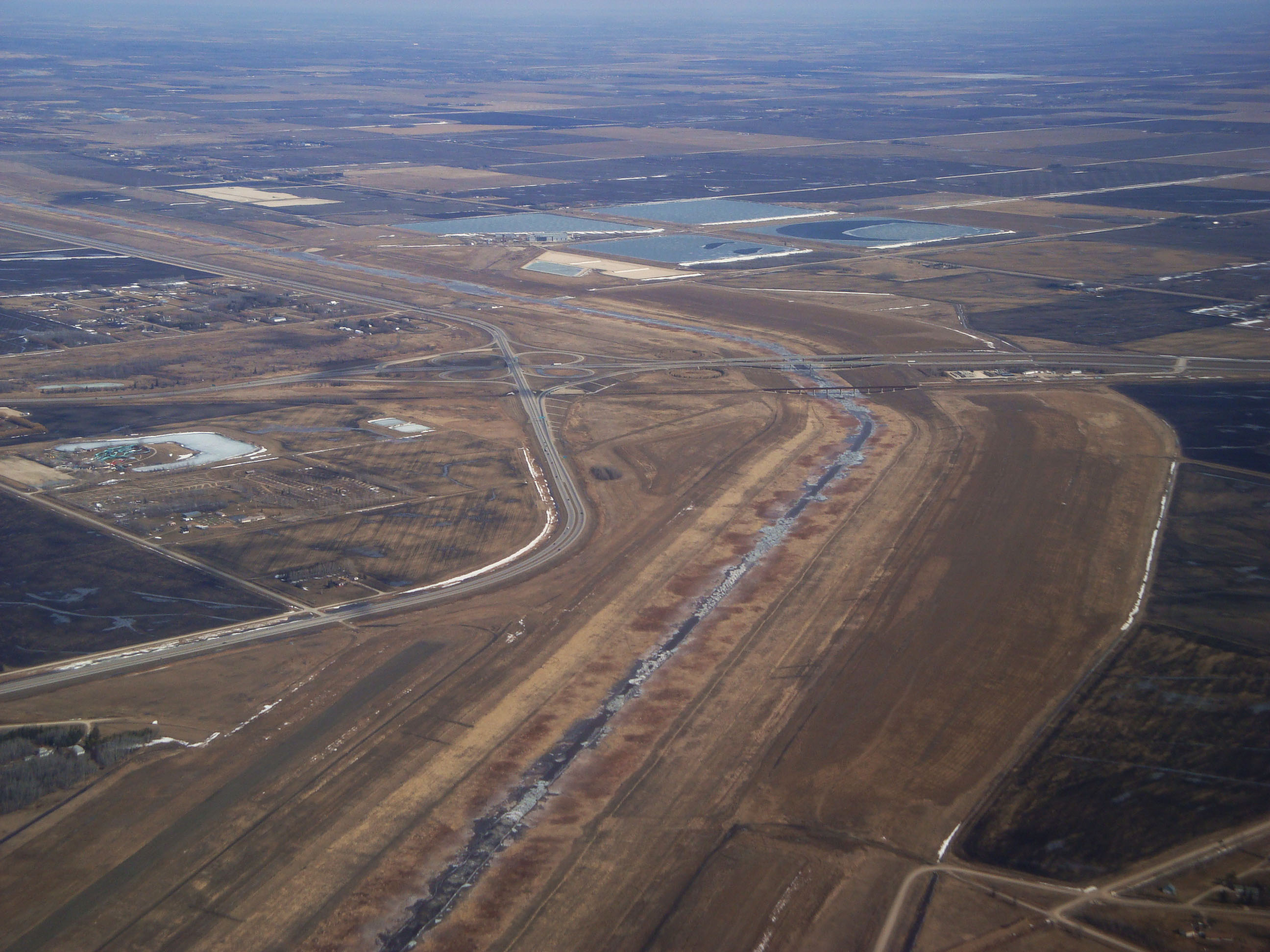
Red River floodway at the southeast corner of the Winnipeg city limits near Lorette as seen from the air. The Trans Canada Highway and Canadian National Railway bridges over the floodway can be seen, along with the Perimeter Highway.

The Red River Floodway is an artificial flood control waterway in Western Canada. It is a 47 km (29 mi) long channel which, during flood periods, takes part of the Red River's flow around the city of Winnipeg, Manitoba to the east and discharges it back into the Red River below the dam at Lockport. It can carry floodwater at a rate of up to 140,000 cubic feet per second (4,000 m^{3}/s), expanded in the 2000s from its original channel capacity of 90,000 cubic feet per second (2,500 m^{3}/s).

The Floodway was pejoratively nicknamed Duff's Ditch by opponents of its construction, after Premier Duff Roblin, whose Progressive Conservative government initiated the project, partly in response to the disastrous 1950 Red River flood. It was completed in time and under budget. Subsequent events have vindicated the plan, leading to the nickname becoming an affectionate one. Since its completion in 1968, the Floodway is estimated to have prevented over $40 billion in cumulative flood damage. It was designated a National Historic Site of Canada in 2000, as the floodway is an outstanding engineering achievement both in terms of function and impact.

From south to north, the Floodway passes through the extreme southeastern part of Winnipeg and the rural municipalities of Ritchot, Springfield, East St. Paul, and St. Clements.

== History ==
Following the submission of the Royal Commission report Manitobans were strongly divided as to whether the province could afford the capital costs of a mammoth engineering project that would benefit primarily Winnipeg. The project was championed by Dufferin (Duff) Roblin, the Leader of the Opposition and head of the Manitoba Progressive Conservative Party, but it was vehemently denounced by opponents as a monumental, and potentially ruinous, waste of money. Indeed, the projected Red River Floodway was derisively referred to as “Duff”s Folly” and “Duff’s Ditch”, and decried as “approximating the building of the pyramids of Egypt in terms of usefulness.” The construction of the floodway and Assiniboine River works, would entail a capital cost of over $72 million, amortized over fifty years at 4% interest, at a time when the province had a population of only 900,000 and an annual net provincial revenue of about $74 million. Following the formation of a new provincial government in June 1958, Duff Roblin, the newly elected Premier of Manitoba, continued to promote the floodway, and managed to secure a commitment from the federal government of Prime Minister John Diefenbaker to pay up to 60% of the construction costs.

Construction of the Floodway started on November 27, 1962, and finished in March 1968. The construction was a major undertaking with 76.5 million cubic metres (2.70 billion cubic feet) of earth excavated—more than what was moved for the Suez Canal.

At the time, the project was the second largest earth-moving project in the world – next only to the construction of the Panama Canal. The total cost at the time was $63 million, equivalent to approximately $505 million today.

== Design ==
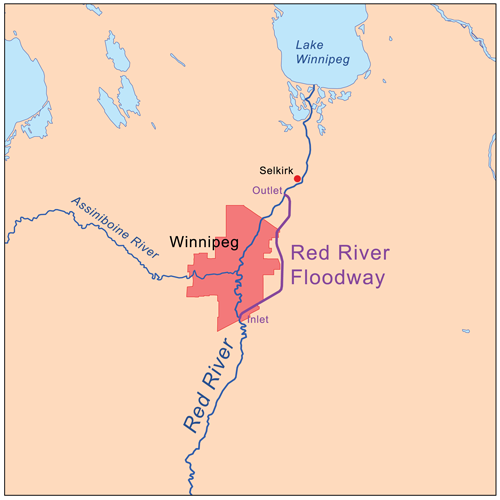

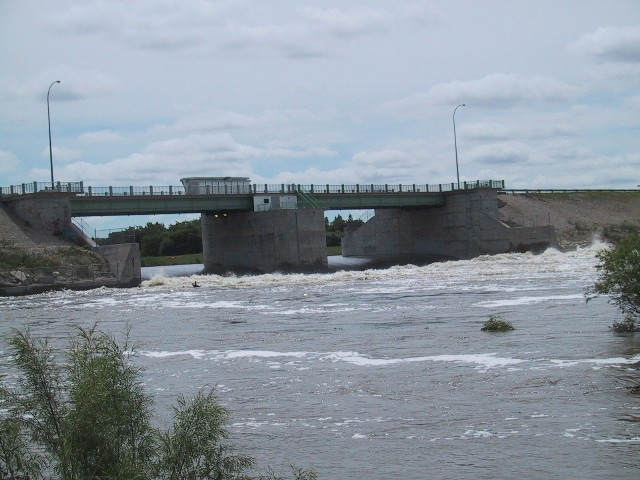
Control gates at the inlet to the Floodway

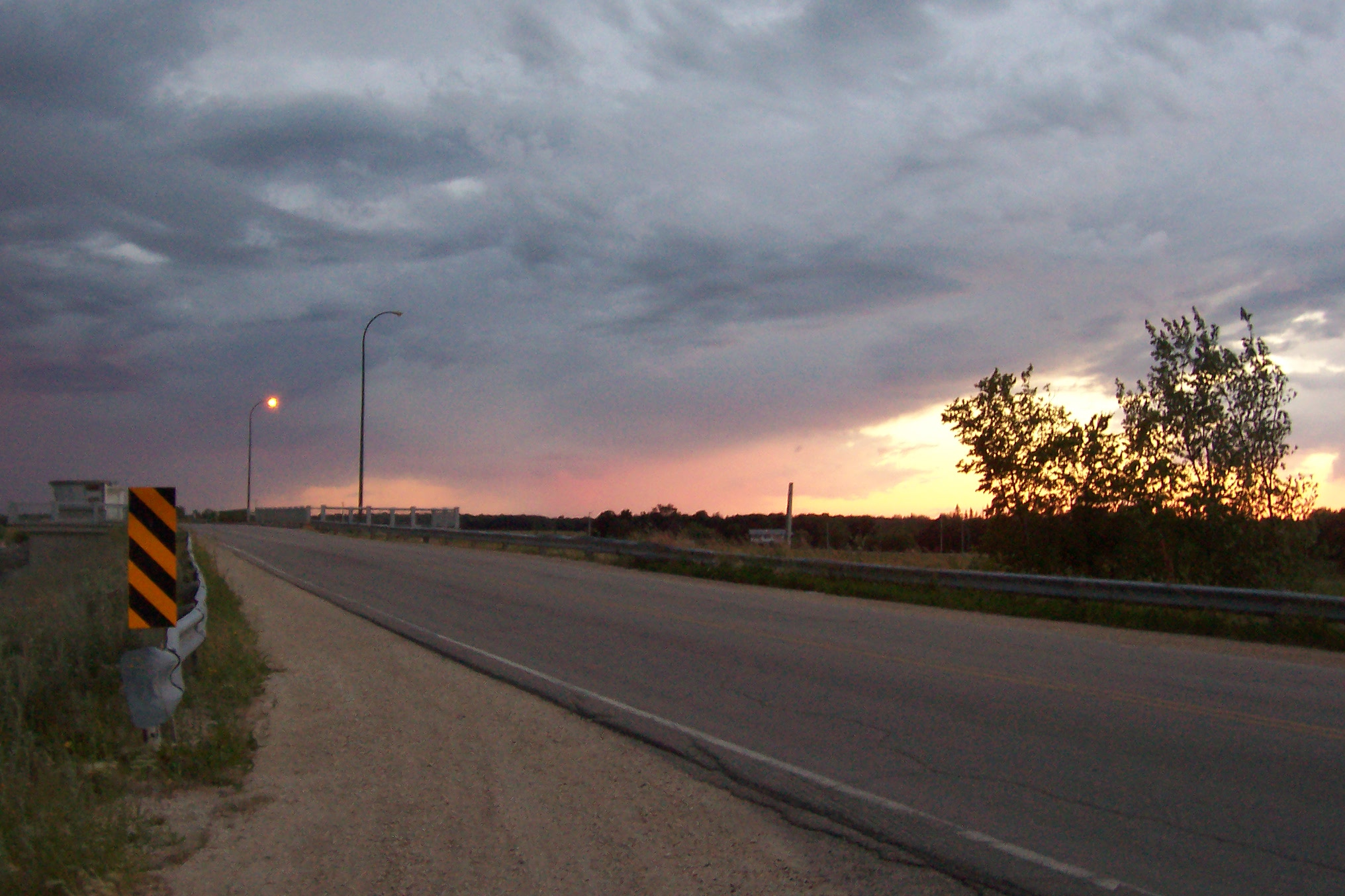
Bridge over the control gates

The Floodway protection system includes more than just the channel to the east of the city, but also the dikes along the river through Winnipeg and the West Dike extending to the southwest from the floodway inlet. Primarily as a result of the Floodway, the city suffered little flood damage. After the 1997 flood, a 2004 re-assessment of the floodway and its channel capacity indicated that 2,500 m^{3}/s (90,000 cu ft/s) could be passed through the floodway during a major flood, but this is considered above the design capacity as it would submerge bridges, and the decision was made to further expand the floodway.

Although the term "floodway gates" is used for the control structure, this is a misnomer as the gates are actually on the Red River as it enters the city and not on the floodway channel. When Red River flows exceed what can safely be handled by the river channel within the city, the gates begin to close by rising up out of the river bed, to the degree needed, restricting water flow into the city to manageable amounts. The resulting upstream back-up of the Red River then flows into the adjacent floodway entrance, diverting the excess flow that could not be safely handled by the river channel within the city. Under flood conditions, even when the floodway is in operation, the Red River within the city will still carry greater than normal amounts of water and some local flood mitigation measures still may be required within the city. The rise in river levels upstream of the gates when in operation needs to be contained by a diking system.

The West Dike which extends to near the village of Brunkild is the limiting factor on the volume of water that can be diverted around the city, as a result of the extremely low grades in the area. This dike was urgently extended by 42 km from its previous western terminus near Domain MB in 1997 to prevent flood water from doing an end run around the original dike. In 2003, the province announced plans to expand the Floodway, increasing its flow capacity from 1,700 to 4,000 m^{3}/s (60,000 to 141,000 cu ft/s). It was decided to widen the Floodway as opposed to deepening it because of the soil and ground conditions in the area. Many underground aquifers in the area are used for drinking water for rural residents and the aquifers could potentially be contaminated if the floodway were deeper. There is also potential for pressures to increase in the aquifers, causing a "blowout" to occur, where water would flow from the aquifers in the ground to the surface and reduce the capacity of the Floodway. Officials decided widening the floodway would be the best option despite the lower hydraulic capacity that would result.

== Flow rates ==
Below are the peak flow rates recorded on the Red River Floodway since it was completed in 1968.

Year	Peak flow (cfs)	Peak flow (m^{3}/s)
1997	66,400	1,880
2009	43,100	1,220
1979	42,000	1,190
1996	38,800	1,100
1974	36,700	1,040
2011	36,700	1,040

== 1997 Red River flood ==
The 1997 flood was a 100-year flood. It came close to overwhelming Winnipeg's existing flood protection system. At the time, the Winnipeg Floodway was designed to protect against a flow of 60,000 cu ft/s (1,700 m^{3}/s), but the 1997 flow was 63,000 cu ft/s (1,800 m^{3}/s). To compensate, the province broke operational rules for the Floodway, as defined in legislation, during the night of April 30 / May 1, to prevent waters in Winnipeg from rising above the designed limit of 24.5 ft (7.5 m) above the "James Avenue datum", but causing additional flooding upriver. Winnipeg Mayor Susan Thompson, announcing that the design limit had been reached, misinterpreted this as good news that the flooding had peaked. City sand-bagging stopped, and national reporters left the city, but the water continued to rise inside and outside of the city until the peak late on May 3 / early on May 4. The city officials have said that the peak occurred on May 1; scientific reports record a peak on May 3/4.

== Expansion ==
Since the 1997 flood resulted in water levels that took the existing floodway to the limits of its capacity, various levels of government commissioned engineering studies for a major increase in flood protection for the City of Winnipeg. Work began in late 2005 under a provincial collective bargaining agreement and has included modifications to rail and road crossings as well as transmission line spans, upgrades to inlet control structures and fire protection, increased elevation of existing dikes (including the Brunkild dike), and the widening of the entire floodway channel. The NDP government set aside a portion of the construction budget for aboriginal construction firms. The Red River Floodway Expansion was completed in late 2010 at a final cost of more than $665,000,000. Since the completion of the expansion, the capacity of the floodway has increased to 4,000 cubic metres (140,000 ft^{3}) per second, the estimated level of a 1-in-700 year flood event. (Using the flow rates of Niagara Falls as a standard of comparison, this is more than double its average of 1,833 cubic metres and about a third over its maximum.) The expanded floodway now protects over 140,000 homes, over 8,000 businesses, and will prevent more than $12 billion in damage to the provincial economy in the event of a 1-in-700 year flood.

The NDP government was criticized by Conservative Brian Pallister, then the Member of Parliament, for requiring workers in construction companies working on the floodway to unionize. Pallister, MP for the Portage—Lisgar constituency and future Manitoba premier, told parliament, "the Manitoba NDP government is planning to proceed with a plan to force every worker on the Red River floodway expansion to unionize, despite the fact that 95% of Manitoba's construction companies are not unionized."

The diversion of flood water has been criticized for shifting the impact of flooding from urban Winnipeg to rural communities such as Emerson, Morris, St Adolphe. In 1997 these towns and the surrounding farm buildings and lands ended up with the bulk of the flood water in order to save Winnipeg from flood damage. In 2011, the Manitoba government intentionally diverted water from the Assiniboine River to save Winnipeg which ended up flooding communities around Lake Manitoba - The communities of Pinaymootang, Lake St. Martin, Little Saskatchewan and Dauphin River were severely impacted, as well as the surrounding farmland and cottages.

== Considerations in the United States ==
The city of Fargo, North Dakota faces very similar flooding challenges to Winnipeg due to its similar topography and position upstream of the Red River. In 2008, the US Army Corps of Engineers began a feasibility study of flood mitigation techniques for the area. During this study, the city faced catastrophic flooding, catapulting the project into public consciousness. In 2010, the US Federal government agreed to work with the city, its smaller sister city of Moorhead, Minnesota, as well as Cass and Clay counties to begin the formal planning process. The Federal government additionally pledged significant financial support for the project. The result was the Fargo-Moorhead Area Diversion Project, which is planned to be operational in 2027.

== See also ==
- Portage Diversion (Assiniboine River Floodway)
- Shellmouth Reservoir
