= 1897 Red River flood =

Natural disaster in North Dakota, United States

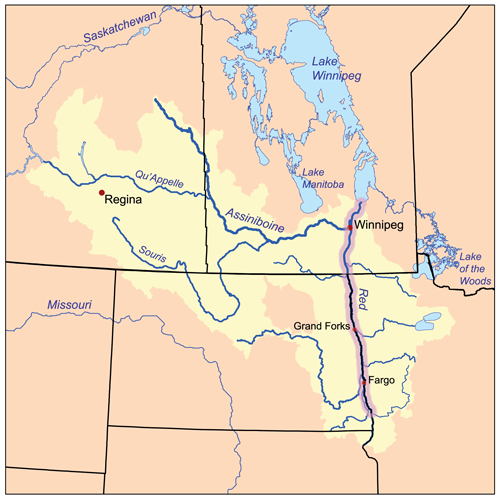
- The Red River drainage basin, with the Red River highlighted
- Date: April 1 - April 24

The 1897 Red River flood took place in April 1897, along the Red River resulting in significant damage to the city of Fargo, North Dakota. The conditions which led to the flood of 1897 were similar to the conditions behind the 2009 flood, however the 1897 flood was different in terms of the human response to it. Although the river gauge was not installed on the Red River until 1901, other sources indicate that the crest of the 1897 flood at a site 1.5 miles (2.4 km) downstream from the present Fargo gauge would have been 40.10 ft (with a discharge rate of 25,000 ft^{3}/s) according to the present datum.

Until the 2009 flood, the 1897 flood was the highest water recorded in the Fargo-Moorhead area and has since served as the benchmark for which many other floods of the Red River were measured against.

== Causes ==
In the spring of 1897 R.M. Probesfield took a measurement of 5 feet (1.5 m) of snow on the ground in an area which was free from drifting; a value 2 feet (0.61 m) higher than one taken prior to the 1861 flood. Due to the level of measured snowfall a flood in the spring was expected.

== River crests ==
City	Crest	Date
Wahpeton, North Dakota	2' 8" above the 1893 high	1897-03-31
Fargo, North Dakota	40.10 ft (present datum); 34.2 ft (1952 datum)	1897-04-07 - Early Morning
Grand Forks, North Dakota	Line along 3rd Street; Covering Demers Ave in East Grand Forks	1897-04-10 - Noon
