= 2009 Red River flood =

Natural disaster in the United States and Canada

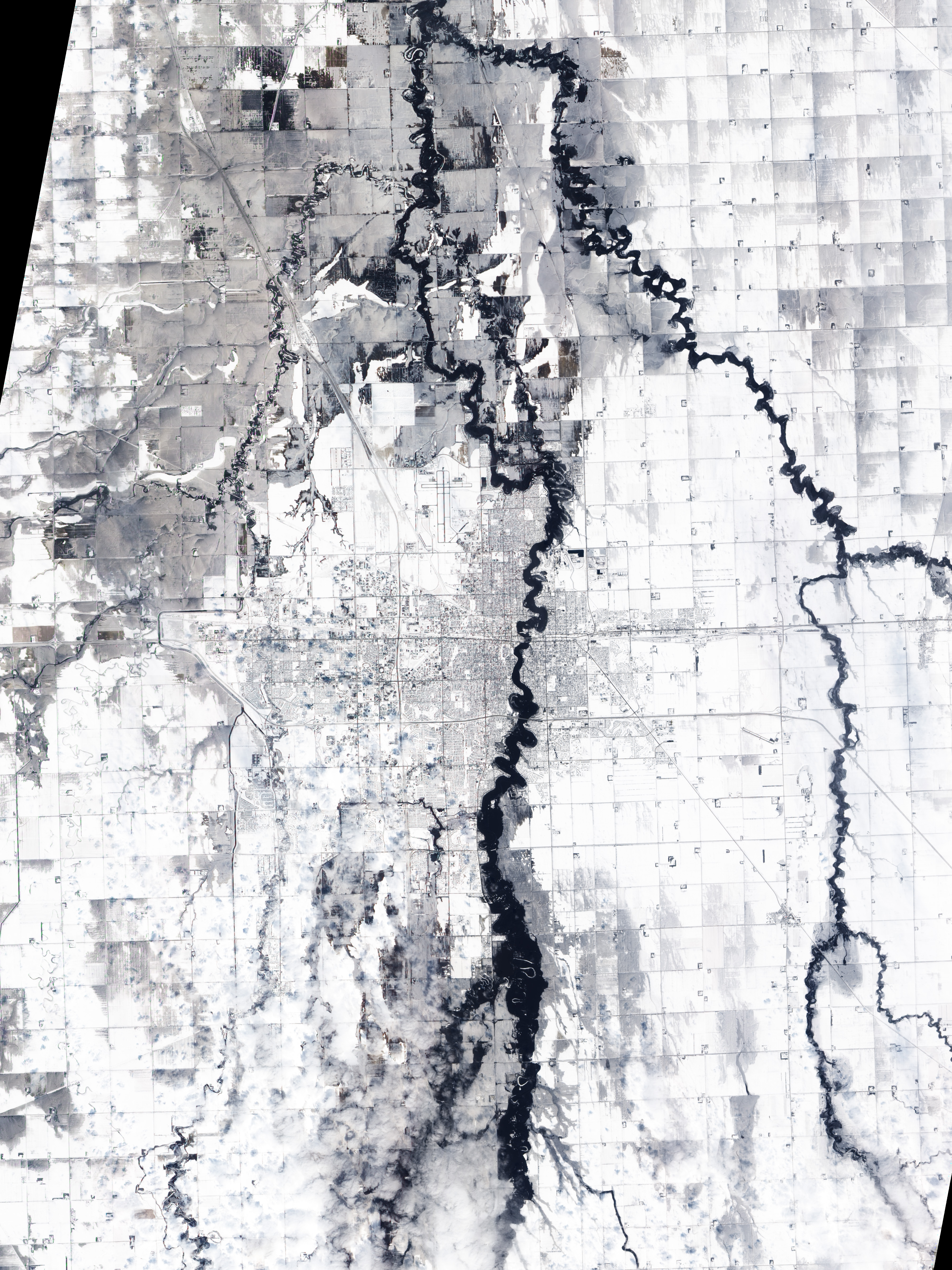
- Red River of the North in Fargo, March 28, 2009
- Date: March 2009–April 2009
- Location: North Dakota, Minnesota, Manitoba
- Deaths: 3
- Property damage: Unknown

The 2009 Red River flood, along the Red River of the North in North Dakota and Minnesota in the United States and Manitoba in Canada, brought record flood levels to the Fargo-Moorhead area. The flood was a result of saturated and frozen ground, spring snowmelt exacerbated by additional rain and snow storms, as well as virtually flat terrain. Communities along the Red River prepared for more than a week as the U.S. National Weather Service continuously updated the predictions for the city of Fargo, North Dakota, with an increasingly higher projected river crest. Originally predicted to reach a level of near 43 feet (13 m) at Fargo by March 29, the river crested at 40.84 feet (12.45 m) at 12:15 a.m. March 28, and started a slow decline. The river continued to rise to the north as the crest moved downstream.

== Background ==
=== Geology ===
The Red River flows from the United States into Lake Winnipeg in Manitoba, Canada. Since it flows northward, into colder climates, melting snow and river ice, as well as runoff from its tributaries, often create ice jams, which cause the river to overflow. The valley is essentially flat, leading to overland flooding, with no high ground on which to take refuge.

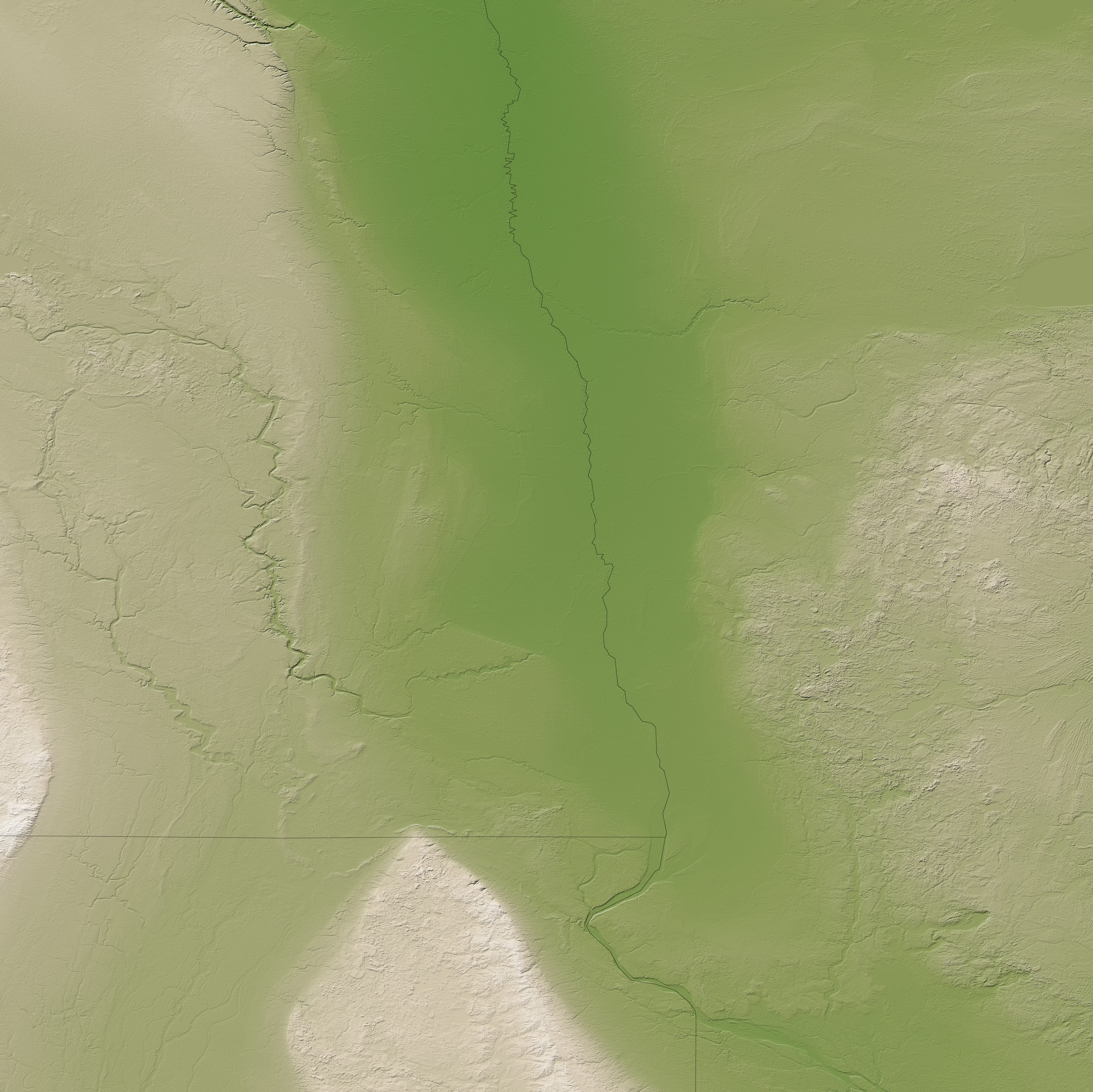
The Red River flood plain. Low-elevation areas are green, while higher elevation regions are tan and white.

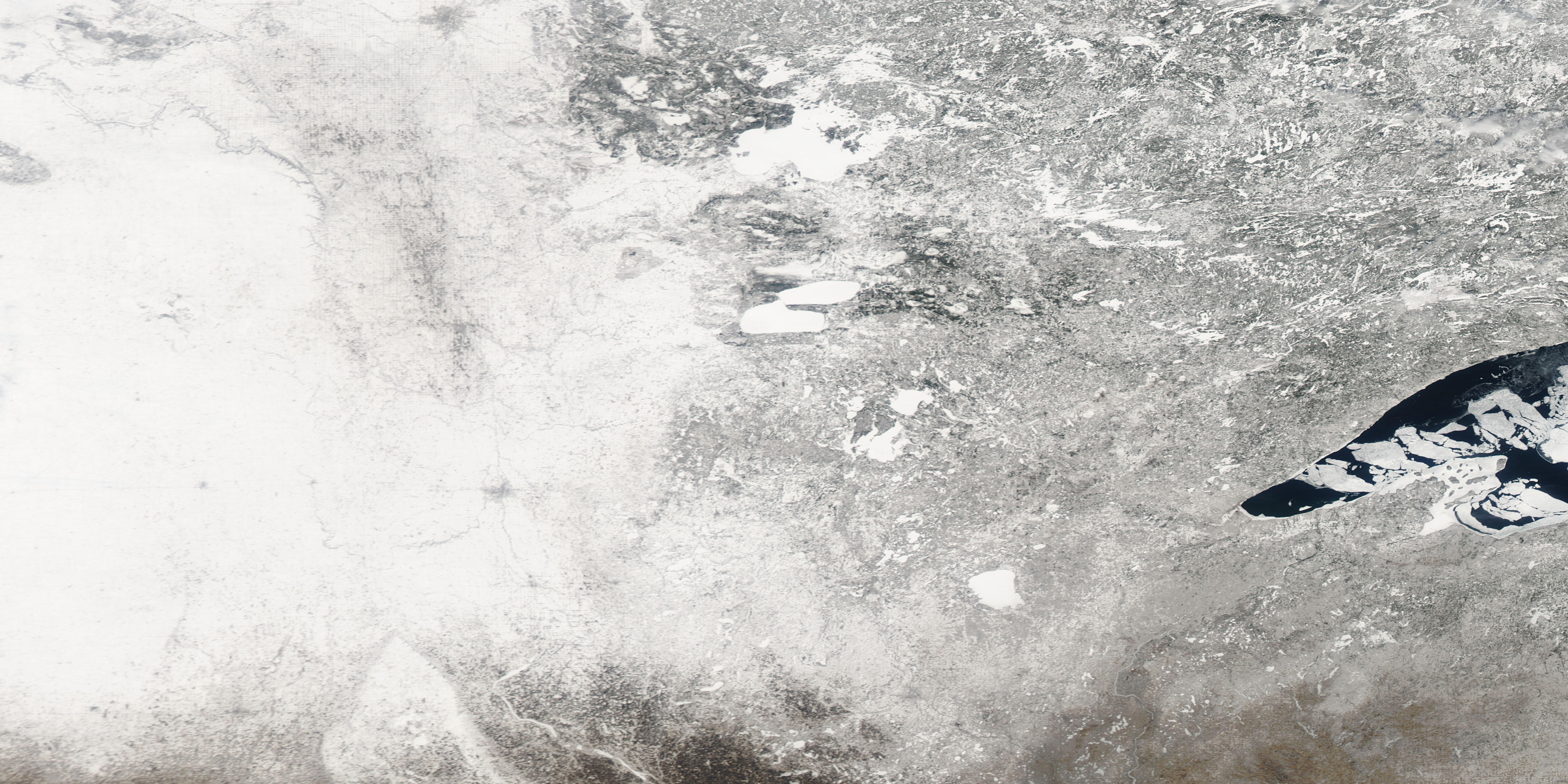
The Red River around Fargo before the 2009 floods started, as seen from space.

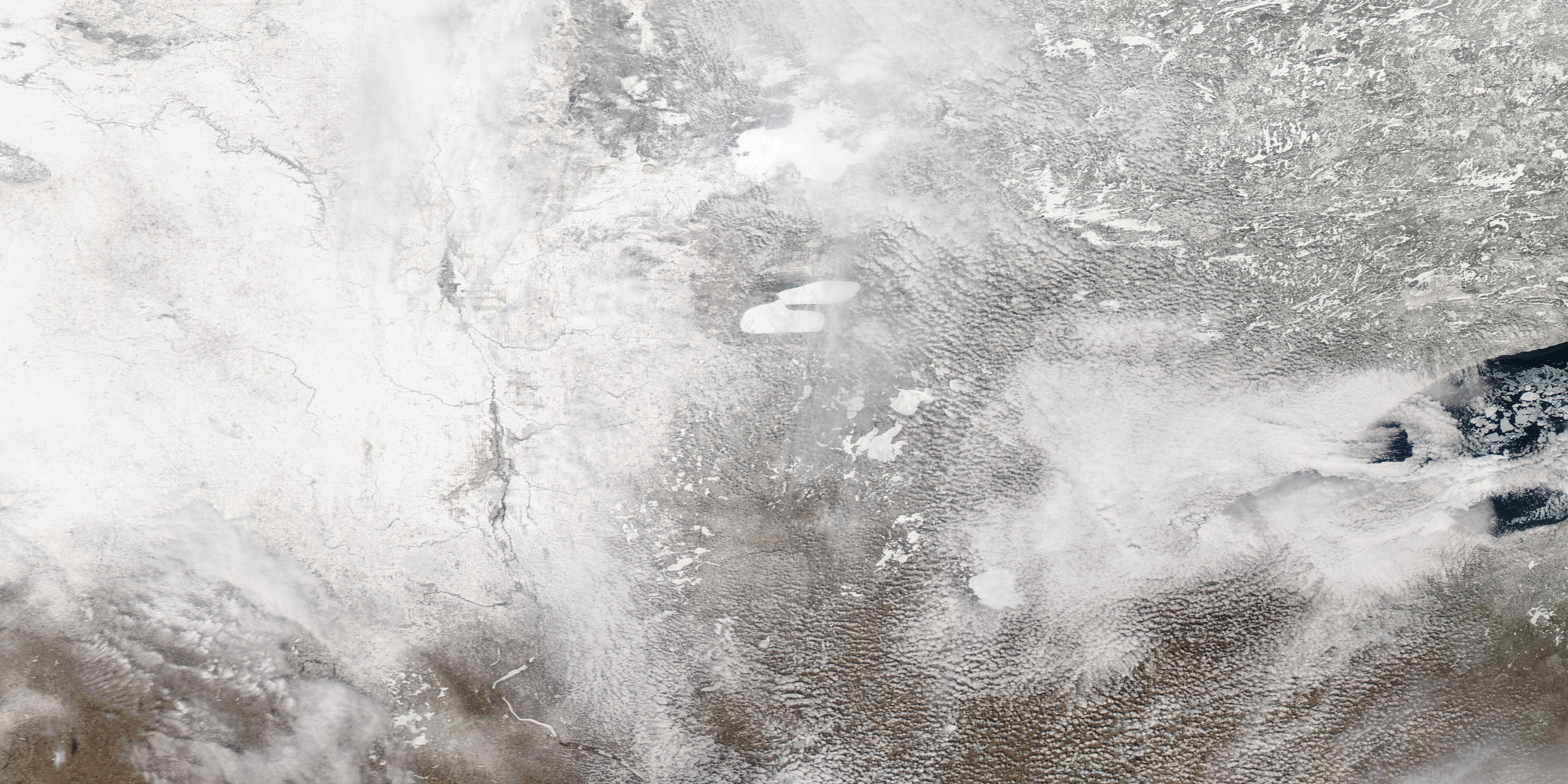
The flooded river around Fargo as seen from space.

=== Climate ===
Ground which was already saturated when it froze at the onset of winter, melting snow which could not be absorbed by the frozen ground, and additional precipitation from high winter snow fall, a rain storm on March 22 and a later snowstorm, high temperature snow melt rate, are reasons for the serious flooding.

A low-pressure area caused the rain storm on March 22 and by March 25 a total of 15 to 25 cm (6 to 10 in) fell in the Winnipeg area, and 20 to 30 cm (8 to 12 in) in southern Manitoba. In northeastern North Dakota and northwestern Minnesota, around 8 inches of snow accumulated from the same storm.

== Predictions and preparations ==
=== Fargo-Moorhead ===
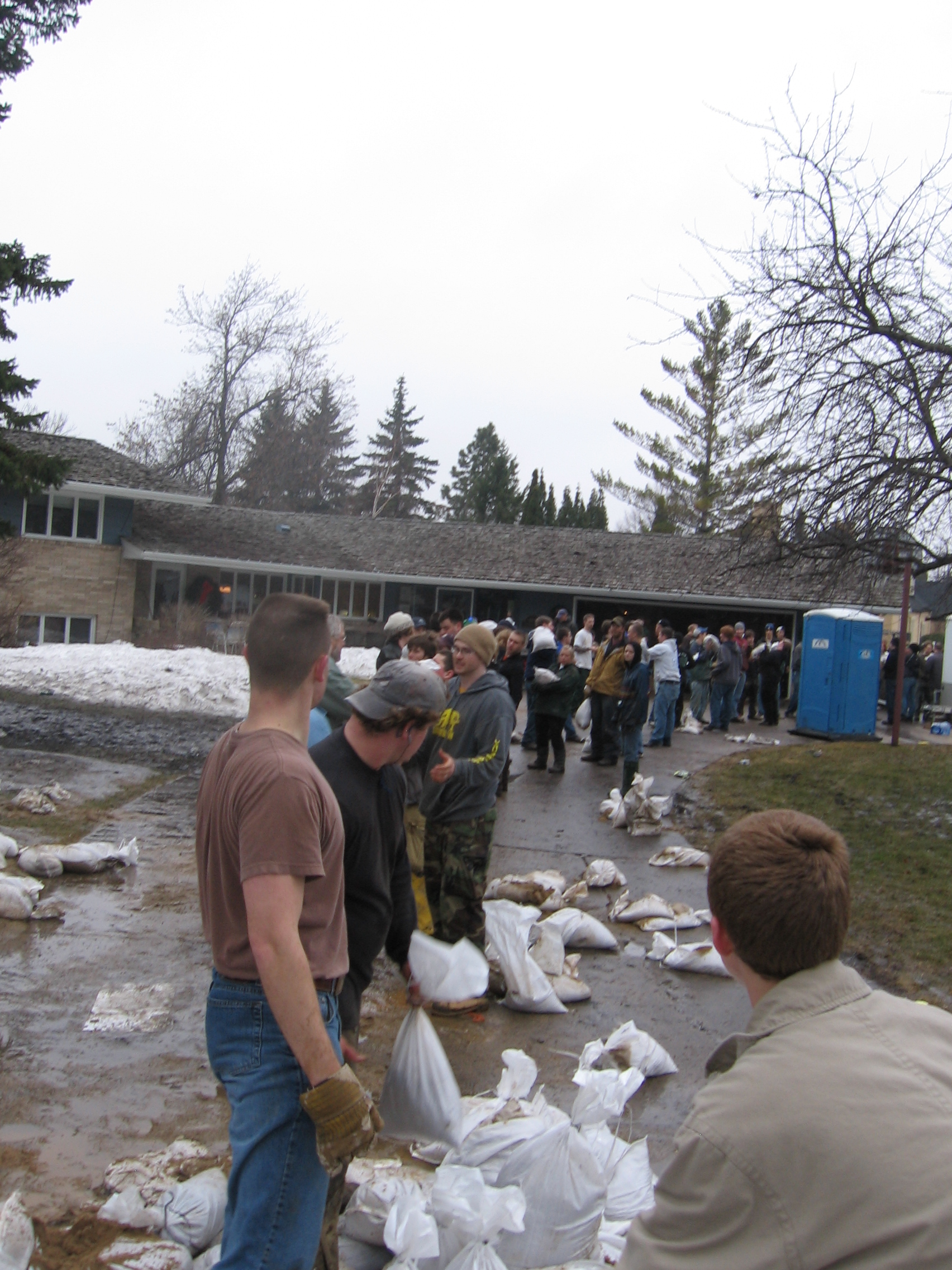
A line of sandbagging volunteers in Fargo, North Dakota.

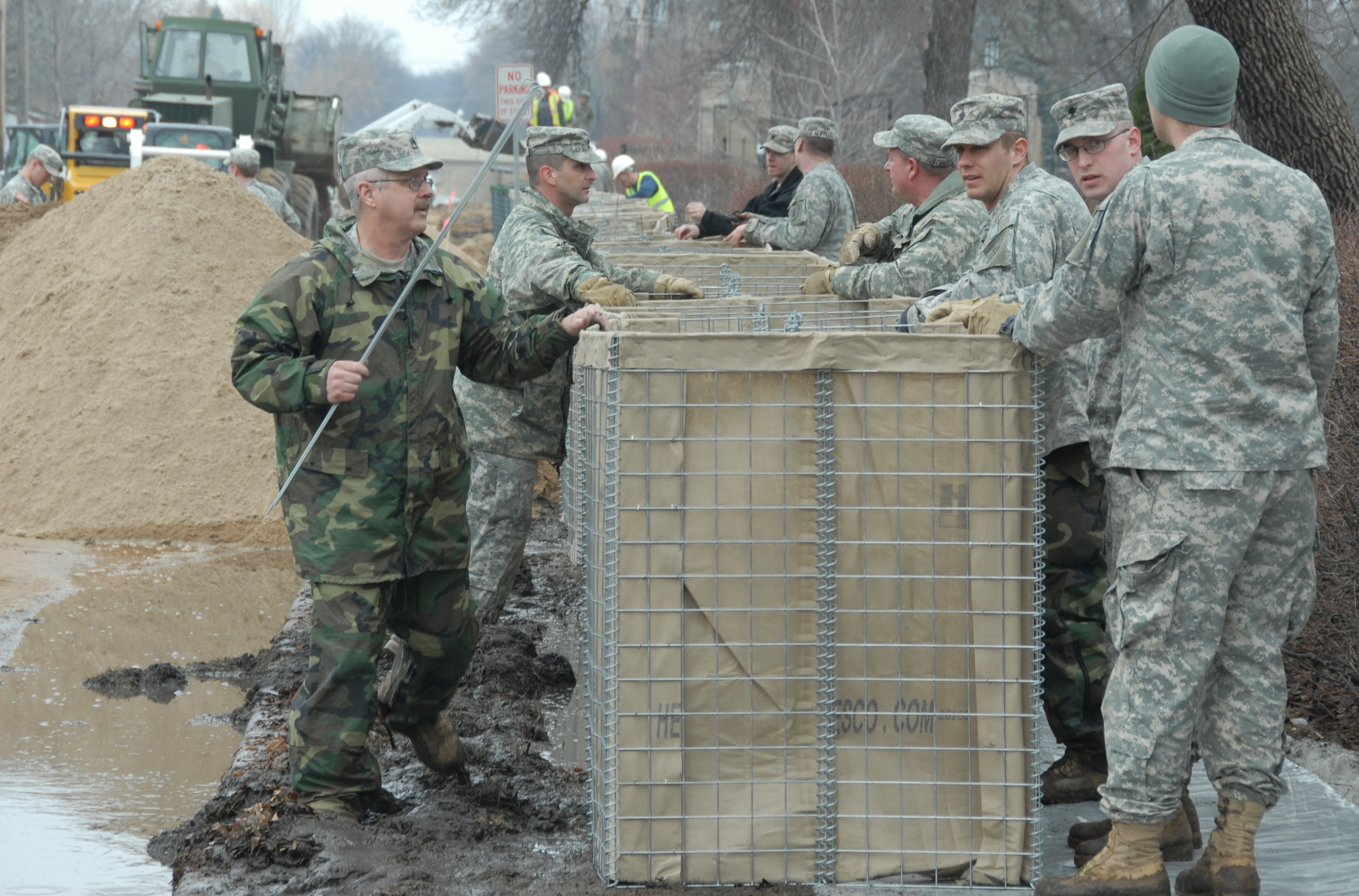
HESCO collapsible barriers were used to prevent flooding

Warnings for the 2009 flood occurred as early as March 9, when the National Weather Service warned that the Fargo-Moorhead area could see a significant flood of between 35 and 36 feet (11 and 11 m). As preparations began for the flooding on March 16, North Dakota Governor John Hoeven declared a statewide disaster in anticipation of flooding across the state. On March 19, the National Weather Service raised the predicted flood level in the Fargo area to between 37 and 40 feet (11 and 12 m). The city began filling sandbags on March 20. In anticipation of a rain and snow storm, the predicted crest level was raised on March 22 to a range from 39 to 41 feet (12 to 12 m).

Volunteers continued preparing sandbags, with 560,000 bags filled by late March 22, out of an expected 1.5 million to 2 million needed. By March 24, residents in Fargo-Moorhead had filled over 1 million sandbags and were attempting to fill a total of 2 million by the 26th. A levee in Georgetown, Minnesota was raised another two feet, and emergency dikes were being built in Fargo, Moorhead, Harwood, Grafton and Richland County. The predicted flood crest was raised again on March 26, changed to between 41 and 42 feet (12 and 13 m) by March 28, with a possibility of 43 feet (13 m).

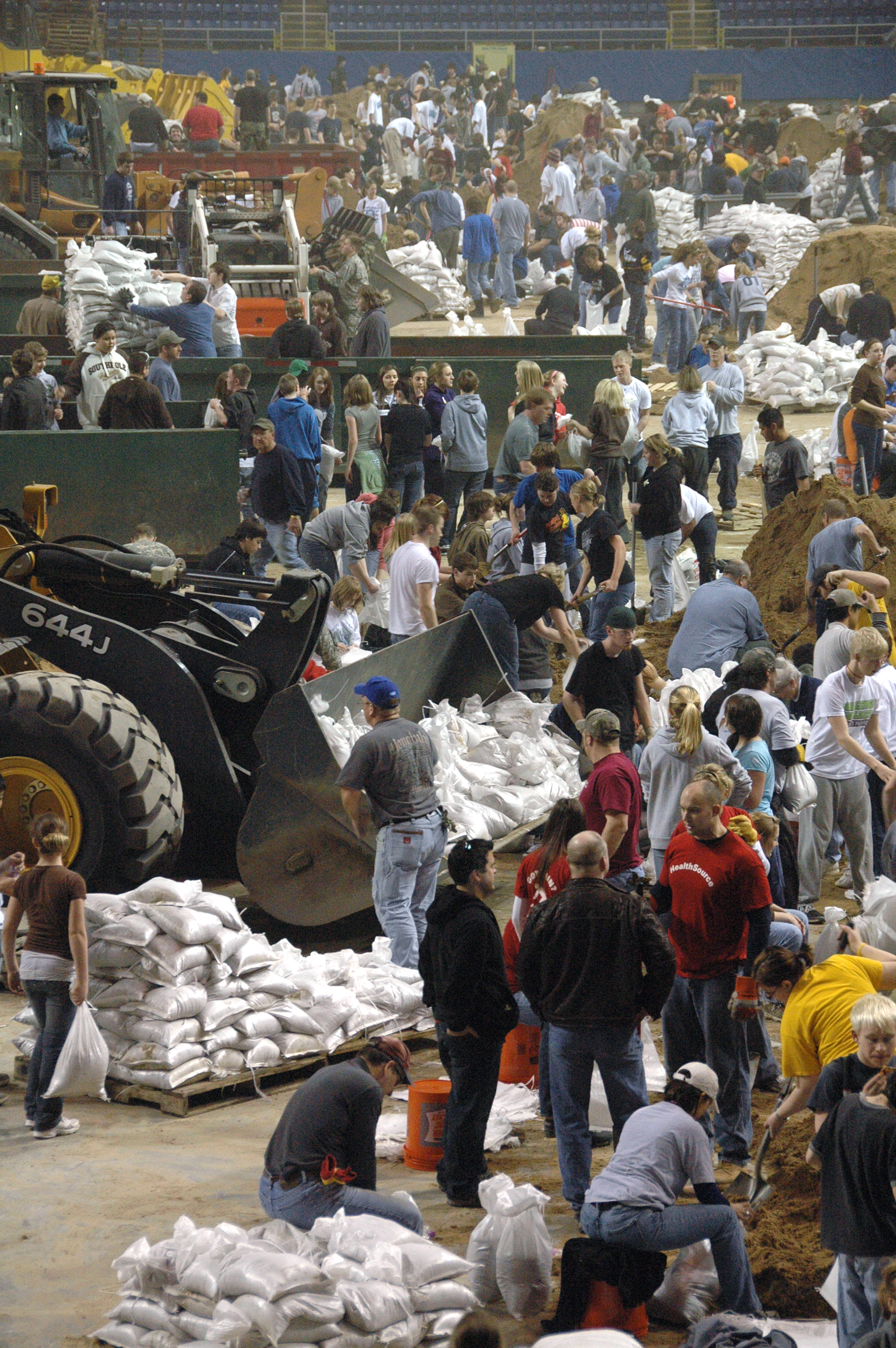
Volunteers fill sandbags in the Fargodome.

In addition to the sandbags, the construction of the dikes protecting the city required large amounts of clay. Clay had been brought from several places in and around the city, including the soccer field at Centennial Elementary School and around Discovery Middle School.

=== Wahpeton-Breckenridge ===
Elsewhere along the river, early predictions for the Wahpeton-Breckenridge area saw a predicted level of at least 16 feet (4.9 m). By March 24, the National Weather Service predicted the crest in Wahpeton and Breckenridge not to top 18 feet (5.5 m), below the cities' levees.

=== Grand Forks ===
In the Grand Forks, North Dakota area, flood predictions released February 27 predicted a possibility of a flood crest between 44 and 46 feet (13 and 14 m). The snowstorm that struck March 9–10 raised the predicted levels between 47 and 50 feet (14 and 15 m) prompting the city to declare a state of emergency. On March 22 the predicted crest level was changed to 52 feet (16 m).

=== Manitoba ===
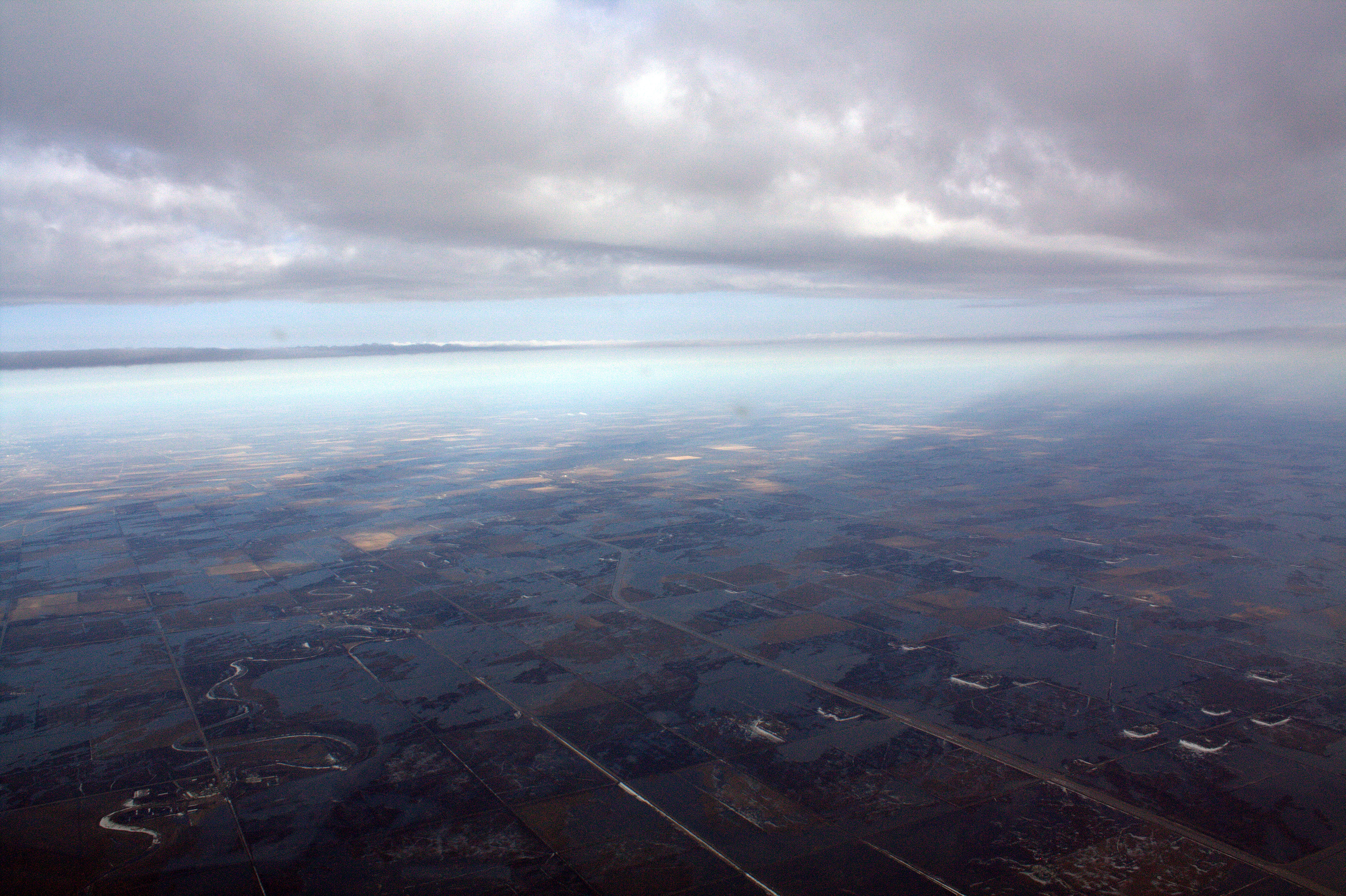
Flooding in Manitoba on April 19, 2009

In Manitoba, the 2009 flood was the second worst on record since 1826. The Red River Floodway was not initially opened, due to the Red River being full of ice, which can lead to damage of the floodway and the flooding of Selkirk. The Red River Floodway was opened in early April once the ice jams cleared. Several towns and R.M.s declared a state of emergency due to the ice jams built up in places along the Red. Flooding in Manitoba was not expected until the second week of April. The CPR Line from Winnipeg to Emerson closed.

The floodway was opened around 1 p.m. on April 8 due to a crest expected to hit the city of Winnipeg. Highway 75, a major artery between Winnipeg and the U.S. border, was closed between April 7 and May 13. This closure cost Manitoba trucking companies thousands of dollars in additional travel costs and severely hurt the economy of the town of Morris.

An eight-year-old boy fell into the river on Thursday, April 9 on the Westroc Hutterite Colony which is near Portage la Prairie. Samuel Gross came out of his 13-day coma after being under icy cold water for 20 minutes. The team under Murray Kesselman, director of the Health Sciences Centre pediatric intensive care unit, worked on Gross's heart for two hours before it started to beat on its own and he began to recover. Walter Imbeck, 68 years old, went missing since April 11 when friends and neighbours thought he was trying to clear a broken drain behind his home, which was along the riverbank. As of April 13, several communities north of Winnipeg had to be evacuated due to flash flooding and ice jams on the Red River. It was predicted to be the third worst flood, next to the floods of 1950 and 1997. A 79-year-old woman, Mary, died, and her 82-year-old husband, Glen Silverthorn, went missing Easter Sunday after their car was swept into the Woody River. A search commenced, and his body was found on May 19.

Prime Minister Stephen Harper toured the flooded area on April 14, 2009. Damages were expected to be in the millions. On April 15, 2009, Winnipeg declared a local state of emergency due to several of the rivers, which flow into the Red River, swelling extremely fast. On April 16, 2009, the Red River crested in Winnipeg at 22.6 feet (6.9 m) before retreating. If Winnipeg had not had any flood protection, the city would have been 9.23 meters (30.3 ft) submerged. The crest from North Dakota was expected to hit either April 19 or April 20 and forced 28,000 evacuations. 777 km^{2} (300 sq mi) are under water at some places 19 kilometers (12 mi) wide as reported April 18. 740 people were evacuated from the Peguis First Nation, which is located north of Winnipeg. Peguis Chief Glenn Hudson said "either build a dike, or a floodway around ... I think we have to do something," Steve Ashton, minister responsible for the emergency measures organization, said that Disaster Financial Assistance was doubled to $200,000. The Federal Government was expected to assist with up to 90% of the relief, and 100% on reserves.

The province assessed whether homeowner buyouts would be voluntary or mandatory. "We'd look at voluntary buyouts as the first option, but the municipalities have raised this ...they're the ones that have to send in first responders and rescue crews," said Steve Ashton, the province's Emergency Measures Minister. Mayor Sam Katz reported an estimated $5 million for sandbag flood prevention costs, which included making and setting into place the sandbags and patrolling them, and then removing them after the river went back down. Some roads and bridges were also damaged as a result of flooding. Peguis Chief Glen Hudson estimated the evacuation and dike construction for the first nation reserve was pegged at approximately $3 million. A water quality warning went into effect, and residents who remained were advised to boil water before use. Free water analysis was provided by the Manitoba government until July. On April 20, the total amount of land submerged was upgraded to 1,680 km^{2} (650 sq mi), and the river crest was still 60 kilometers (37 mi) south of Winnipeg.

== Flooding ==
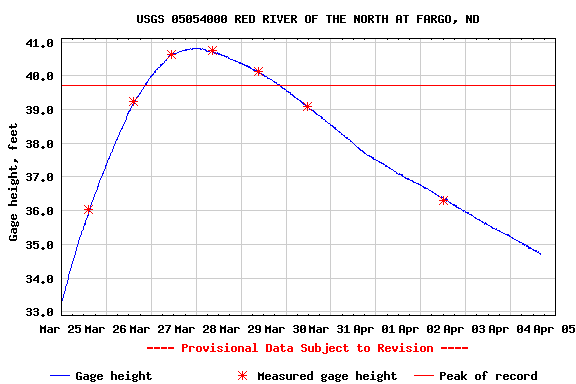
A graph of the flood gauge reading at Fargo from March 25–April 4, showing the previous record level in red

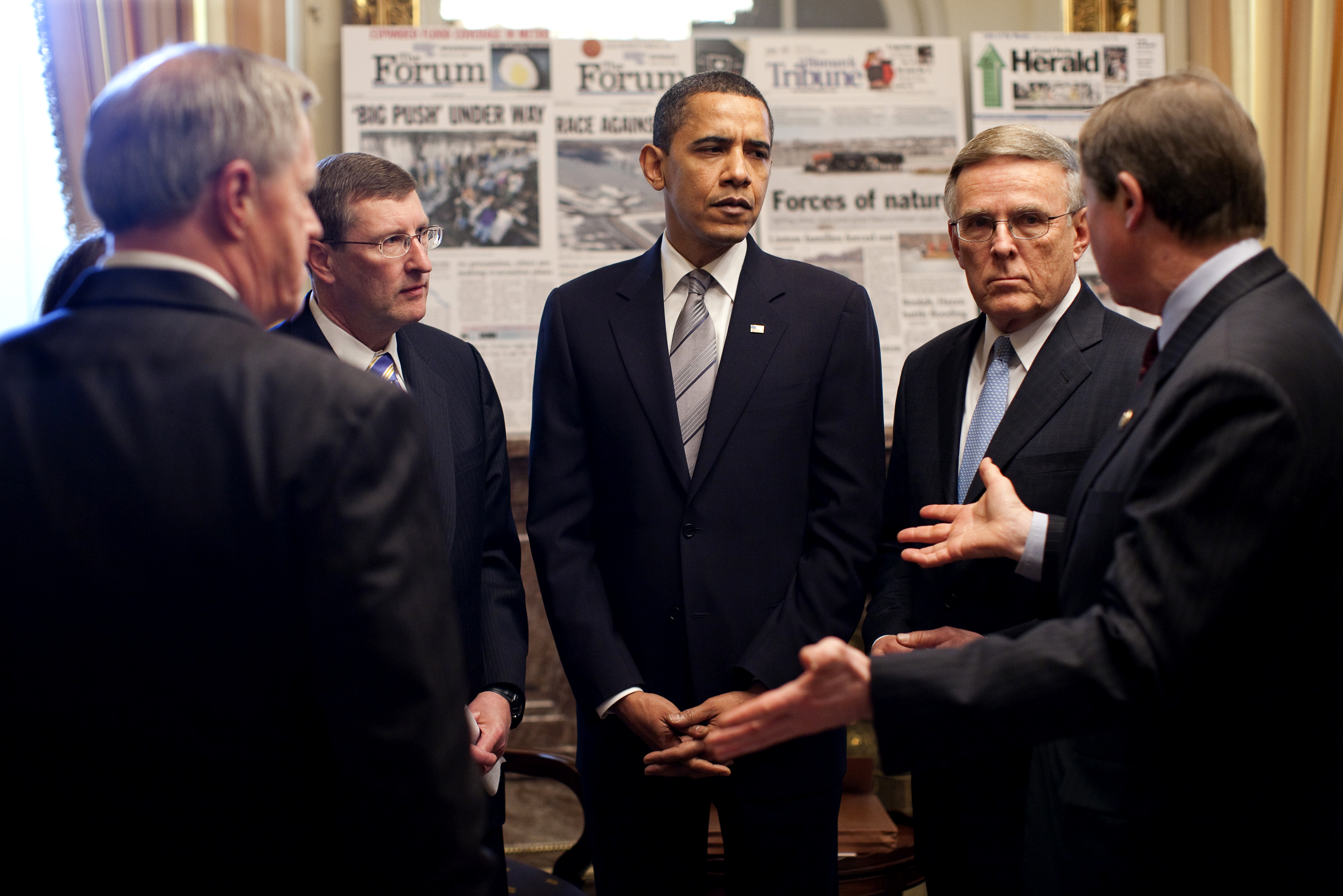
U.S. President Barack Obama, at the U.S. Capitol, meets with Minnesota and North Dakota's senators and representatives about the flooding.

At 7:15 p.m. CDT on March 26, 2009, the river exceeded the 1997 crest of 39.57 feet (12.06 m) at Fargo, which was the previous second-highest crest. The projected crest was 24 feet (7.3 m) above flood stage and higher than the record-setting floods in 1997 and 1897.

At 2:30 a.m. CDT on March 27, the National Weather Service offices in Grand Forks issued a Flash Flood Warning for extreme east-central Cass County due to a levee breach in Fargo on Lindenwood Drive. With the river more than 6 meters (20 feet) above flood stage, there appeared to be a growing sense in Fargo that despite best efforts, it might not be possible to build dikes high enough to hold back the river. The Manitoba government upgraded the 2009 flood as the second highest to hit southern Manitoba over the last 150 years, just 60 centimeters (24 in) lower than the 1997 Flood of the Century. The highest level in 2009 was 6.9 meters (23 ft), and in 1997 it was 7.5 meters (25 ft). However, without flood control measures such as the Red River floodway, Portage Diversion and Shellmouth dam, the peak would have been 10.2 meters (33 ft), which is higher than the 1950 peak of 9.3 meters (31 ft) in Winnipeg. The Red River showed signs of receding April 23, however the Souris river was expected to crest towards the end of the month of April.

=== Ice jams ===
On March 25, an ice jam formed north of Winnipeg, causing the municipalities of St. Andrews, St. Clements, East St. Paul and West St. Paul to declare a state of emergency. Flooding from the ice jam necessitated the evacuation of about thirty homes. While the jam was broken, it reformed near Lower Fort Garry, causing the water to rise 4.5 meters (15 feet) in 2 hours. On March 31, a state of emergency was declared for the city of Selkirk due to concerns over ice jams.

Dominion City was the first town in Manitoba to declare a state of emergency on Monday, March 23. Government officials handed out evacuation alerts to 850 residents. Forty homes north of Winnipeg were evacuated, while dozens of homes were flooded due to ice jams. On Thursday, March 26, some 95 elderly and special needs people were evacuated from the Roseau River Anishinabe First Nation. An engineering firm detonated charges downstream of Bismarck, North Dakota to clear an ice jam which was causing flooding in the city causing an evacuation of 1,700 persons. There were three million sandbags, rolls of poly film Hesco bastion flood walls, and water pumps sent out by the U.S. Army Corps of Engineers to North Dakota. Both North Dakota and Manitoba used backhoes from the river bank and from bridges, but these machines had a 20-foot (6.1 m) reach for a 0.25-mile-wide (0.40 km) river. A Chinook helicopter was deployed with a 1,400-kilogram (3,100 lb) concrete weight to try to break up an ice jam, but only small pieces of ice broke away. The North Dakota National Guard used 160 pounds (73 kg) of C-4 plastic explosives on the 3-foot-thick (0.91 m) ice placed into 80 holes. The ice was then coated with road salt to hasten melting. The Army Corps of Engineers also resorted to using sand, salt, chemicals and drilling to alleviate the ice jams. The Manitoba government chose not to use dynamite, as explosives work well on large ice sheets but not as well on broken and fused ice. To set the dynamite, holes need to be drilled in the ice, which would require someone to hang suspended from a helicopter. The result of dynamite forms a hole centrally in the ice without loosening up the ice jam blockage to allow water to flow past. Manitoba purchased five new certified emergency response trailers (CERTs), which are 15-meter-long (49 ft) tubes with 60 compartments which can be filled with water and used to build dikes. These tubes take 10 minutes to fill up and provide the same protection as 500 sandbags. Volunteers created over 600,000 sandbags to shore up defences against the Red River and unpredictable flows caused by ice jams.

Dikes were placed along the shoreline within the city to protect neighbourhoods against ice jam flooding. Over 1,600 volunteers came out since April 1 to assist with creating sandbag dikes which were built 20.5 feet (6.2 m) high. Frozen culverts and sewer inlets were cleared to allow runoff from meltwaters and floodwaters.

External videos
- Amphibious icebreaker in Selkirk
- Greg Selinger about 3rd icebreaker

Amphibex excavator icebreakers were at work breaking up ice flows on the Red River. Ice breakers and backhoes were to be strategically placed along the Red River Floodway, which might have needed to be opened before the ice was fully melted. Officials examined past ice jams and provided contingency plans if the Floodway jammed upstream of bridges or on tight corners.

On Easter Sunday, April 12, Winnipeg was clear of ice blocks and ice jams. Sightseers traveling by car, boat, kayak and anyone ignoring road closures were being ticketed by the Royal Canadian Mounted Police as they were hampering ice clearing operations. Residents of the rural municipalities of St. Andrews and St. Clements were given evacuation alerts on Good Friday. Some chose to remain behind, and rescue efforts commenced for them over the Easter week-end. Homes were smashed in and knocked off their basements and footings by 7-foot-high (2.1 m) sheets of ice.

=== Devils Lake and Stump Lake ===
There was a 6% chance Devils Lake and Stump Lake would rise to historic levels, which could have caused problems in the Sheyenne River Valley.

== Flooding and ice jam mitigation considerations ==
Structural adaptations to the river channel or the placement of dams and ice booms would control where ice jams would form. Hairpin curves and bridges are problem areas for the jamming of ice. Following the 1997 Red River flood, Grand Forks and East Grand Forks smoothed out some of the river curves in those cities. Rural municipality reeves have approached the Canadian government with a CA$288,000 plan which would use the province of Manitoba's existing Amphibex ice-breaking excavators to dredge the Red River between Selkirk and the mouth of Lake Winnipeg.

== See also ==
- Red River Flood (disambiguation)
- Red River Floodway
