= 2021 Haiti earthquake =

7.2-magnitude earthquake in Tiburon Peninsula, Haiti

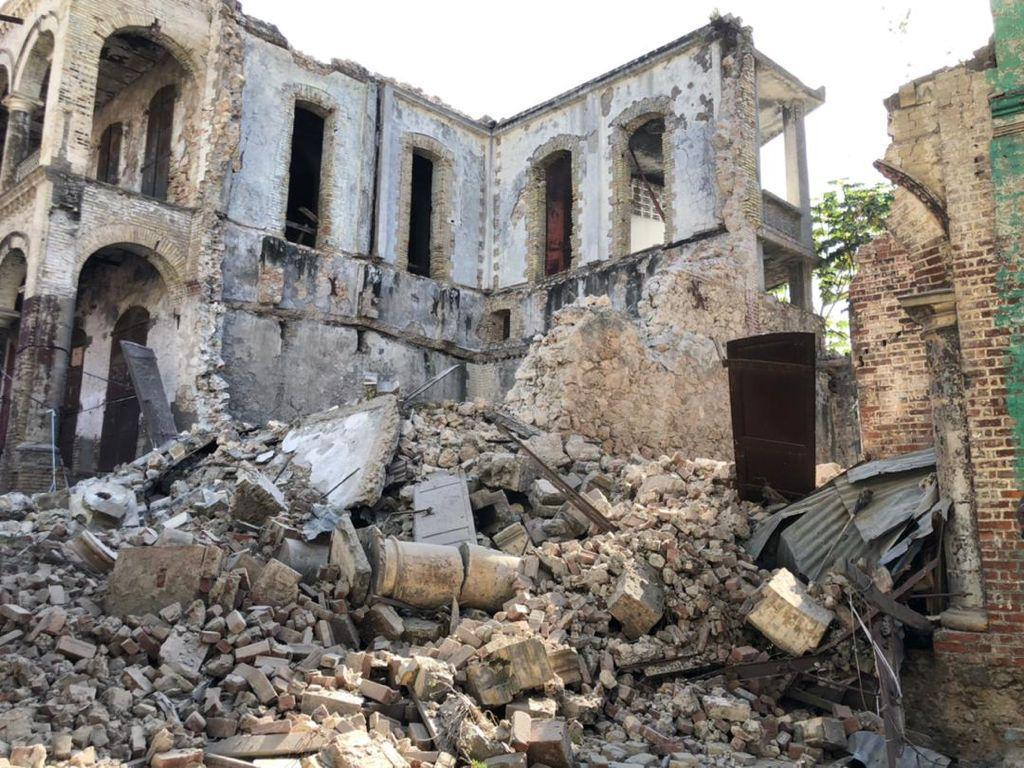
- Destruction from the earthquake
- Map of main shock and aftershocks – M 4.0 or greater (map data)
- UTC time: 2021-08-14 12:29:08
- ISC event: 620986707
- USGS-ANSS: ComCat
- Local date: 14 August 2021
- Local time: 08:29:08
- Magnitude: 7.2 M_{w}
- Depth: 10 km (6.2 mi)
- Epicenter: 18.417°N 73.480°W
- Fault: Enriquillo–Plantain Garden fault zone
- Type: Oblique-reverse
- Total damage: US$1.5–1.7 billion
- Max. intensity: MMI VIII (Severe)
- Peak acceleration: 0.47 g
- Tsunami: 3 cm (0.098 ft)
- Aftershocks: At least 900
- Casualties: 2,248 dead 12,763 injured 329 missing; 2 dead, 52 injured (2022 aftershocks)

At 08:29:09 EDT on 14 August 2021, a magnitude 7.2 earthquake struck the Tiburon Peninsula of southern Haiti. It had a 10-kilometre-deep (6.2 mi) hypocenter near Petit-Trou-de-Nippes, approximately 150 kilometres (93 mi) west of the capital, Port-au-Prince. Tsunami warnings were briefly issued for the Haitian coast. At least 2,248 people were confirmed killed as of 1 September 2021 and more than 12,200 injured, mostly in the Sud Department. An estimated 650,000 people were in need of assistance. At least 137,500 buildings were damaged or destroyed.

It is the deadliest earthquake and deadliest natural disaster of 2021. It is also the worst disaster to strike Haiti since the 2010 earthquake. UNICEF estimates more than half a million children were affected. The Haitian Civil Protection General Directorate (DGPC) warned of a possible large humanitarian crisis resulting from the earthquake. USAID provided US$32 million in foreign aid to Haiti for reconstruction efforts following the devastating earthquake. This earthquake had the most casualties of any disaster since the 2018 Sulawesi earthquake. The economic loss from this earthquake is estimated at over 1.5 billion US dollars, nearly 10% of the country's gross domestic product.

== Tectonic setting ==
Haiti lies within the complex plate boundary zone between the North American plate to the north and the Caribbean plate to the south. This zone is interpreted to contain a number of microplates, particularly the Gonâve microplate, which is bounded to the north by the Septentrional-Oriente fault zone and to the south by the Walton fault zone and the Enriquillo–Plantain Garden fault zone, all of which are active left lateral transform faults. Although dominated by lateral motion the plate boundary zone also accommodates a component of north–south shortening. This has led to overall transpression along the main strike-slip faults. The largest earthquake in the region prior to the 2021 event was in 1952, and measured 6.2 magnitude, occurring 35 km to the west.

In the Tiburon Peninsula, the main structure is the Enriquillo–Plantain Garden fault zone, which runs along its length. This fault zone carries almost half of the left lateral displacement between the North American and Caribbean plates, with a displacement rate of about 7 mm per year. The epicentre of the 2010 Haiti earthquake was located at the eastern end of the peninsula and was caused by movement on previously unknown thrust faults that form part of the overall fault zone, without rupturing the main strike-slip fault strand. The same fault zone is thought to have been the source of the 1751 and 1770 earthquakes that destroyed the capital Port-au-Prince.

== Earthquake ==
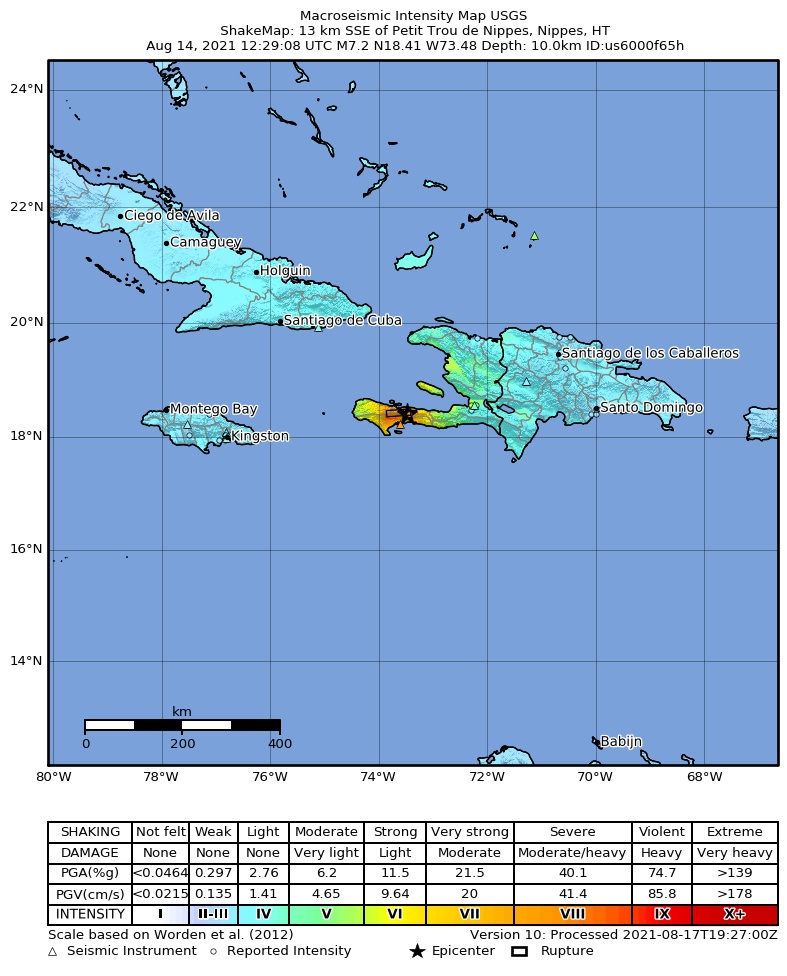
USGS intensity of earthquake

The earthquake occurred as a result of oblique-reverse faulting on an 80 km (50 mi) section of the Enriquillo–Plantain Garden fault zone, 125 km (78 mi; 67 nmi) west of the Haitian capital Port-au-Prince, consistent with its location and the observed focal mechanism. It had an estimated hypocentral depth of 10.0 km (6.2 mi).

Finite-fault inversion and back projection indicated an earthquake rupture on two separate strike-slip and reverse faults that are not connected to the main strand of the plate boundary fault. The initial rupture occurred on a blind thrust fault, but movement transitioned to left-lateral strike-slip faulting. The rupture jumped a restraining bend onto another strike-slip fault; both separate branches of the plate boundary fault, and previously unidentified. The rupture process of the earthquake indicate the highly oblique motion between the two tectonic plates. The restraining bend where the rupture jumped from a reverse fault to a strike-slip fault was located beneath Pic Macaya. The reverse fault, located east of the bend experienced an estimated maximum slip of 2.7 m (8.9 ft). The strike-slip fault produced up to 1.3 m (4.3 ft) of left-lateral displacement.

The earthquake produced significant afterslip in its aftermath. During the first four days, afterslip east of Pic Macaya released the energy equivalent to a M_{w}7.0 earthquake. Movement propagated to the surface three days after the mainshock.

Two weeks after the 2010 earthquake, a paper was published about coulomb stress transfer due to the event. The paper identified two sections east and west of the 2010 rupture which had accumulated significant strain as a result. The 2021 rupture may have been encouraged by the 2010 event due to stress transfer. Although it struck west of the 2010 rupture, a large seismic gap exists between the two events. It is thought that stresses on that section are still insufficient to trigger an earthquake rupture.

=== Aftershocks ===
At least 900 aftershocks have been recorded following the mainshock, the strongest being M_{w} 5.8 in magnitude and centered approximately 65 kilometers further west on the Tiburon Peninsula. Additional tremors shook Les Cayes city on 19 August 2021. On 21 December, a 4.4 magnitude aftershock struck the area, causing further damage and injuring 150 people, most of them indirectly. On 24 January 2022, the same region was struck by two aftershocks, measuring 5.3 and 5.1 M_{w}, respectively. The aftershocks killed two people; one from a landslide in Fonds-des-Nègres, and the other in Anse-à-Veau by a collapsing wall. Fifty-two people were also injured. At least 191 houses were destroyed and 600 suffered damage in Nippes.

2021 Haiti earthquake sequence (only earthquakes with magnitudes 5.0 or greater)
Date and time (UTC)	Location	M	MMI	Ref
2021-08-14 12:29:08	13 km SSE of Petit Trou de Nippes	7.2	VIII	
2021-08-14 12:49:33	20 km WNW of Cavaillon	5.2	V	
2021-08-14 16:08:03	10 km NW of Baradères	5.1	VII	
2021-08-14 18:11:10	12 km NNE of Baradères	5.1	III	
2021-08-15 02:37:53	11 km NW of Petit Trou de Nippes	5.0	III	
2021-08-15 03:20:45	12 km NNE of Chardonnière	5.8	VII	

Interactive map of 2021 Haiti earthquake

=== Intensity ===
According to the USGS PAGER service, the Modified Mercalli intensity scale (MMI) of the earthquake reached VII (Very Strong) in Les Cayes and MMI V (Moderate) in Port-au-Prince. The earthquake was also felt in Jamaica, where the intensity reached MMI IV (Light) in Kingston.

Modified Mercalli intensities in selected locations
MMI	Locations
MMI VIII (Severe)	Nan Cotie; Gross Mary
MMI VII (Very strong)	Les Cayes, Corail; Port-à-Piment; Petit Trou de Nippes; Jérémie
MMI VI (Strong)	Miragoâne; Léogâne
MMI V (Moderate)	Port Au Prince; Jacmel
MMI IV (Light)	Kingston; Santiago de Cuba

== Effects ==
Widespread tsunami warnings were issued throughout the Caribbean, with waves up to 3 to 10 feet (1–3 metres) high initially expected to hit Port au Prince. The tsunami warning was later rescinded. The tsunami only reached 3 cm (0.098 ft) in height in that location.

At least 8,444 landslides were triggered across a 2,700 km^{2} (1,000 sq mi) area. A large portion (89.4 percent) of these reported landslides occurred on the hanging wall of the fault—particularly at Pic Macaya National Park which accounted for 72.2 percent of the total or 6,100 reports. The total area of these landslides was 45.6 km^{2} (17.6 sq mi). Landsliding was more widespread than compared to the 2010 earthquake.

== Impact ==
The city of Les Cayes, Haiti's third-largest city, was the closest to the epicenter of the earthquake. The city suffered extensive damage including many collapsed homes, places of worship, and commercial buildings. According to the Haitian Civil Protection Agency, at least 37,300 or more homes were destroyed and 46,000 others were damaged as of 16 August. The Haitian Civil Protection General Directorate later reported that more than 60,700 homes have been destroyed and 76,100 others have sustained damages as of 18 August. There were also a number of hotels that were severely damaged or collapsed. At least 53 medical facilities suffered partial damage while six were totally destroyed. In addition to that, the quake damaged or destroyed 1,060 schools.

A report published by the Inter-American Development Bank estimated the total losses at US$1.6 billion, or 9.6% of Haiti's gross domestic product (GDP). The report stated that the estimate was based on a fatality figure of 2,500. The total damage cost range from US$1.5 to 1.7 billion.

The Immaculee Conception Church of Les Anglais, a historical landmark constructed in 1907, collapsed when the quake struck during a Mass. The collapse of the facade of the church killed 17 people. Two individuals trapped under the rubble were rescued by nearby construction workers. At Toirac village, just outside Les Cayes, 20 people died in the collapse of the St. Famille du Toirac church during a funeral Mass. In Marceline, a small town 30 minutes away from Les Cayes, the main Catholic church collapsed. Two women cleaning the church were killed. In the Les Cay Diocese, more than 220 Catholic places of worship were destroyed.

=== Casualties ===
Haitian prime minister Ariel Henry declared a state of emergency due to the high number of casualties and the severe damage. At least 2,248 people died in the earthquake, including 1,852 in Sud, 227 in Grand'Anse, 167 in Nippes and two in Nord-Ouest. The Hôtel Le Manguier in Les Cayes collapsed in the earthquake, killing several people, including Gabriel Fortuné, the former senator and former mayor of Les Cayes. Portions of the Catholic bishop's residence in Les Cayes collapsed, killing a priest and two employees and injuring Cardinal Chibly Langlois. In addition to the deaths, at least 12,763 people have been injured and 329 are still missing.

A report published by UNICEF on 30 August 2021 stated that at least 800,000 people, 250,000 of them children, had been affected by the quake and are in need of humanitarian aid. An estimated 81,000 Haitians have no access to safe drinking water. The United Nations (UN) in Haiti said 650,000 Haitians are in need of humanitarian aid, and the World Food Programme stated that 754,200 are experiencing food insecurity.

According to the UN, Haiti needs more than $187 million of aid to support Haiti after the disaster.

== Aftermath ==
Search and rescue teams of Haitian police and Haitian health department workers were joined by volunteers. Foreign charities, nongovernmental organizations, and other volunteer groups sent workers, supplies, and equipment to help in the recovery and search and rescue.

On 23 August, rescue workers found 24 people, 20 adults, and four children, alive under the rubble of a collapsed building near the mountain Pic Macaya. The survivors were then transported to Camp-Perrin, where they received further treatment for their injuries. Just a few days before, on 17 August 16 people were rescued from a former UN-occupied building in Les Cayes. Rescuers also recovered nine bodies from the building.

The UN requested over $180 million to aid in recovery efforts related to providing basic living assistance to victims and the surrounding area. Due to the destruction of critical markets and agriculture, the UN Food and Agriculture Administration requested $20 million to aid in recovering farming practices. Grand'Anse, Nippes, and Sudd have been cited as being the most negatively impacted by food loss and scarcity.

Shelter has been cited as the greatest need of the affected region. More than 50,000 homes and shelters were destroyed. Haitian people are sleeping in homes missing roofs and walls, open fields, and public buildings. Nongovernmental organizations supplied Hatian's who lost their homes with temporary shelters. These temporary shelters have become long term shelters as Haiti continues to rebuild.

The earthquake was also said to have triggered a surge in violent crimes and protests already spiraling out of control. The earthquake is also said to have triggered additional burden on working women and caused a temporary setback in their career progressions. In the aftermath of the earthquake, majorities of the population have said that gender based violence has increased as a result of the earthquake.

== Impact of Hurricane Grace ==
Rescue efforts were hindered due to rain from Tropical Depression Grace on 16 August. The National Hurricane Center forecasted Tropical Depression Grace to produce up to 15 inches (380 mm) of rainfall in some spots in Haiti, threatening rescue and recovery efforts in the affected area. Torrential rain and flood brought by the storm threatened the affected area with the potential for mudslides.

As a direct result, many villages were left disconnected so the villagers started voluntary rebuilding efforts. The trust towards the government is low in the areas as the citizens do not expect help due to the great complications, further mobilizing the voluntary project.

== Response ==
=== National ===
According to Prime Minister and acting President Ariel Henry, local hospitals have been overrun by the large inflow of injured victims after the earthquake. Henry declared a month-long state of emergency for the country after the quake. The Haitian government, under the Ministére de Travaux Publics, Transports et Communications (MTPTC) and the Bureau d'evaluation Technique des Bâtiments (BTB) used funds provided by the international community to implement a damage and repair program.

The Global Facility for Disaster Reduction and Recovery (GFDRR) and the World Bank gave Haiti $50.5 million to improve their Disaster Risk Management (DRM) systems as well as Haiti's emergency preparedness and response infrastructure. One way Haiti used this money was by rebuilding emergency operation centers damaged by the earthquake. These centers are used for planning and creating response plans during disasters.

=== International ===
- European Union: Three million euros in emergency funding were made available by the EU to meet the most pressing requirements. In order to channel emergency personnel and supplies from France, Luxembourg, The Netherlands, Spain, Norway, and Sweden, it activated the EU Civil Protection Mechanism. The UN Office for the Coordination of Humanitarian Affairs, was one of the first humanitarian partners to mobilize and offer help in order to ensure a prompt and well-coordinated response between humanitarian actors and Haiti's civil protection, thanks to funding from the European Union.
- Argentina: Foreign Minister Felipe Solá ordered the deployment of White Helmets Commission to the area to assist local authorities in humanitarian missions. Solá further stated that Argentina is willing to deploy more personnel in rescue missions.
- Canada: Prime Minister Justin Trudeau said that the nation is "ready to assist in any way" in the wake of the event. A travel advisory was issued against traveling to Haiti by the Canadian government.
- Mexico: The Mexican government sent a C-295 and a C-130 from the Mexican Air Force, loading 15,400 kg (33,069.3 lb) of medicine and supplies for the people affected. On 16 August, three aircraft from Mexico's Secretariat of National Defense and Navy arrived in Haiti, carrying aid. The first two aircraft which arrived transported food supplies, sanitation items, and medical supplies. Additional food and survival items arrived on the third aircraft. Rescue and recovery equipment such as forklifts, water filtration devices, lamps, blankets and shovels were also sent to Haiti.
- United Nations: The UN requested to the Brazilian government, the deployment to Haiti of Brazilian forces of the Army and Marine Corps, in order to secure the stability in the face of ongoing humanitarian crisis. The request was confirmed by President Jair Bolsonaro. The Brazilian Armed Forces also participated in the United Nations Stabilisation Mission in Haiti (MINUSTAH) between 2004 and 2017.
- United States: President Joe Biden authorized the US response for assistance in the aftermath of the earthquake, appointing USAID Administrator Samantha Power to coordinate in the relief. The United States Agency for International Development (USAID) said on 26 August that US$32 million worth of aid would be provided to Haiti to support the ongoing relief efforts. The money would be used to deliver immediate needs such as medical services, food, shelter, drinking water, and sanitary items.

Additionally, Mexico, Peru, Argentina, Chile and Venezuela had offered assistance in the search for survivors. A group of 34 firefighters from Ecuador were dispatched to assist in search and rescue efforts.

Japanese professional tennis player Naomi Osaka, who is of Haitian descent, stated in a tweet that she would donate all her prize money at the Cincinnati Masters to support rescue and recovery efforts ongoing in Haiti.

American sportswear brand Skechers announced on 19 August that they would be contributing US$1 million in donations to support ongoing rescue and recovery efforts. The brand said they would be donating to three organizations; CORE (Community Organized Relief Effort), Hope for Haiti and World Central Kitchen. Kenneth Cole is donating a percentage of their net sales to the St. Luke Foundation and asking their customers to donate $10 for extra support. Amazon has sent over 35,000 emergency items to Haiti: including medical supplies, tents, water filters and more.

== Political and humanitarian concerns ==
=== Moïse assassination and current government ===
The earthquake escalated the political turmoil in Haiti. President Jovenel Moïse had been assassinated in his home on 7 July 2021. Forty four people were arrested in connection to the assassination and Moïse's death left Haiti in political turmoil which the earthquake later escalated.

=== Gang violence and looting ===
Following the earthquake, gangs had overtaken neighborhoods and villages in Haiti. "According to the National Human Rights Defense Network, there are more than 90 gangs in the country, likely with thousands of members and far more powerful than the police," Bloomberg reports. Gangs have control over major roads heading south. In mid-August, the gang announced a ceasefire to allow trucks to use the road to provide aid to southern communities. Several trucks were looted at gunpoint, despite the truce. On 19 August, two of Haiti's doctors, including one of the few orthopedic surgeons, were kidnapped. It is unclear whether gangs were responsible for these abductions; however kidnapping is a common gang practice. The kidnappers contacted the doctor's families, however the ransom demands are unknown.

== Gallery ==
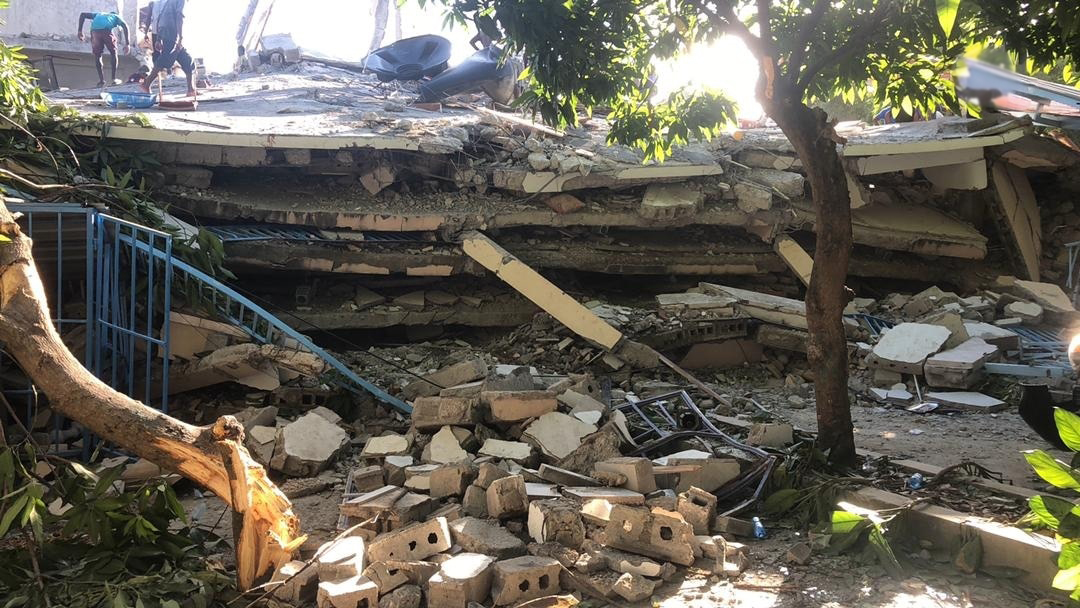
A destroyed building.

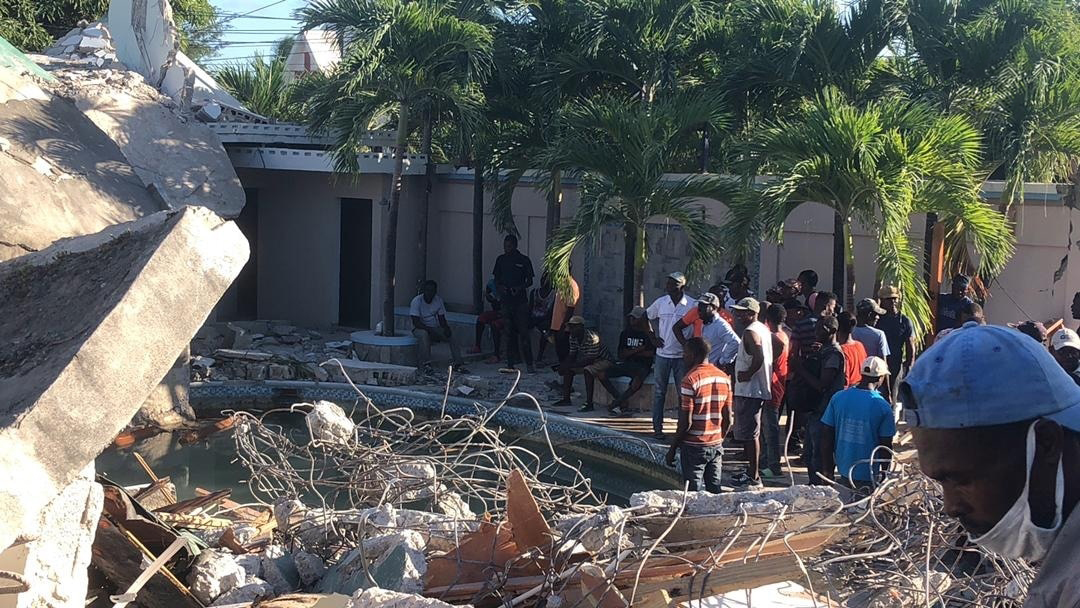
Destruction across the street.

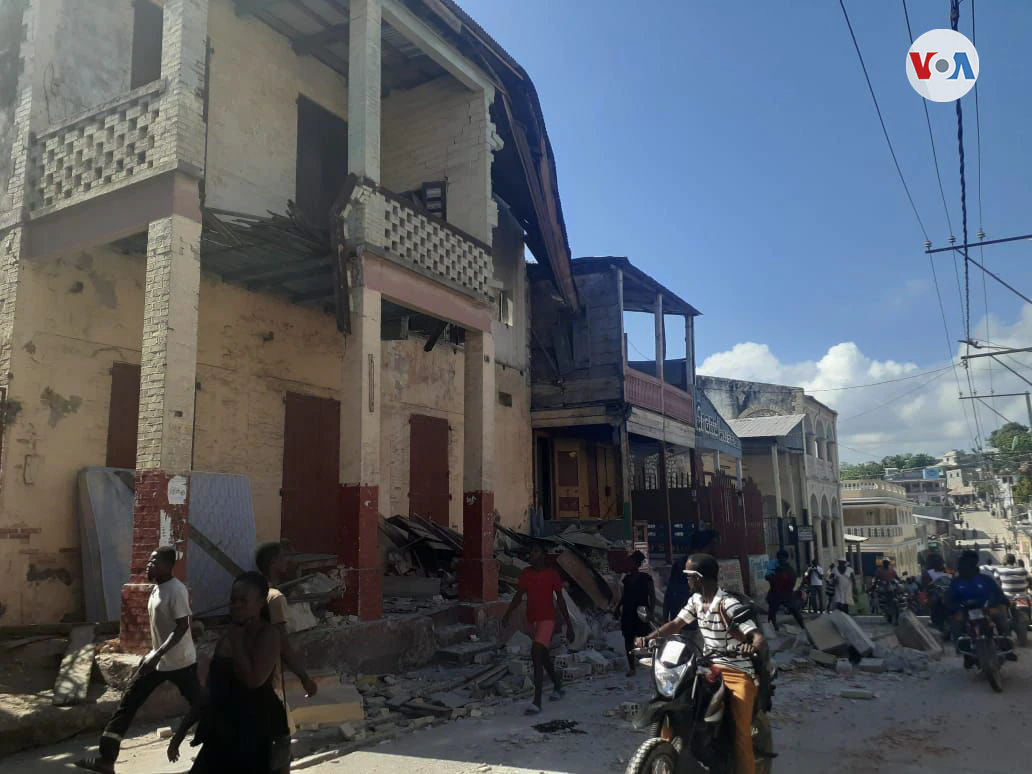
Exterior damage.

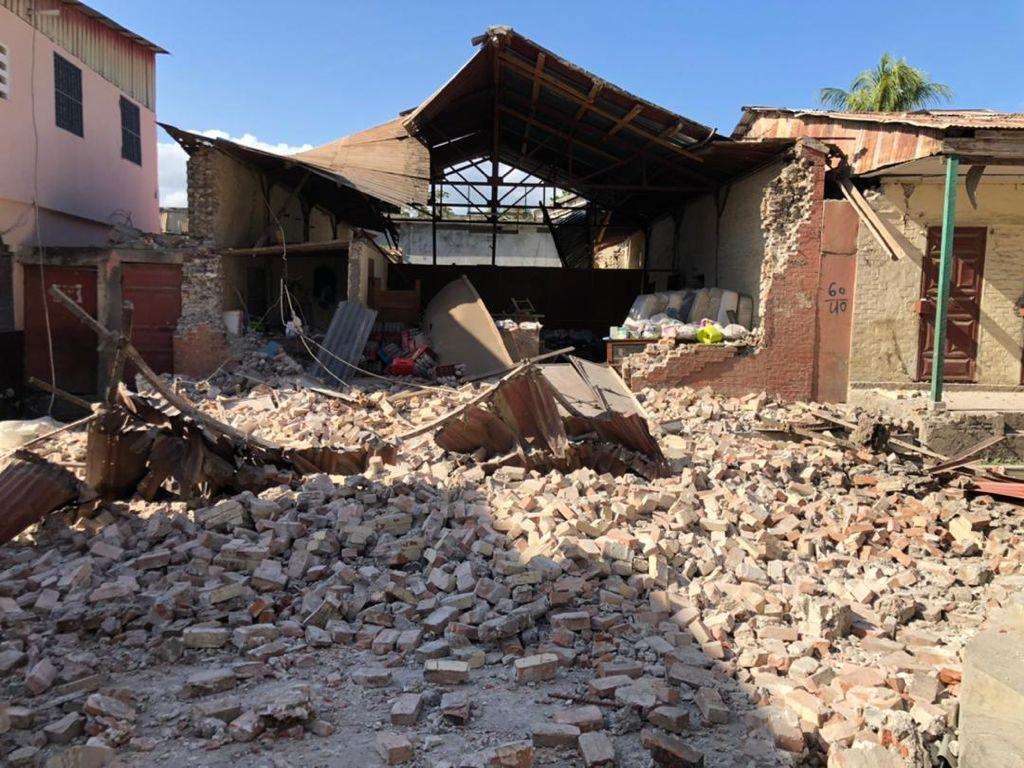
Damage to a building. Rubble strewn all over.

== See also ==
- List of earthquakes in 2021
- List of earthquakes in Haiti
- List of earthquakes in the Caribbean
