= List of earthquakes in Haiti =

Epicentres of major earthquakes in Haiti with year of occurrence

Some of the earthquakes in Haiti have been very destructive to the country. The widespread damage and high-number of casualties of events in 2010 and 2021 can be partially blamed on the fact that most of the population in Haiti resides in structures that are vulnerable to earthquake shaking, in which they are made of stone and concrete.

== List of major earthquakes ==
Date	Region	Mag.	MMI	Fatalities	Injuries	Comments	References
2023-06-06	Grand'Anse	4.9 M_{w}	VII	4	36	Moderate damage	
2022-03-23	Grand'Anse	5.1 M_{w}	VIII		5	Minor damage	
2022-01-24	Nippes	5.3 M_{w}	VII	2	52	Moderate damage	
2021-12-21	Grand'Anse	4.4 M_{w}	V		150	Additional damage/Aftershock	
2021-08-14	Nippes, Les Cayes	7.2 M_{w}	VIII	2,248	12,763	Severe damage	
2018-10-07	Port-de-Paix	5.9 M_{w}	VI	18	580	Moderate damage	
2017-09-02	Hinche	4.3 M_{w}	IV		1	Minor damage	
2011-06-24	Port-au-Prince	3.5 M_{w}	III		7	Injuries caused by stampede.	
2010-01-12	Port-au-Prince	7.0 M_{w}	X	100,000–316,000	300,000	Extreme damage	
1994-03-02	Port-de-Paix	5.4 M_{w}	V	4		Damaged houses	
1964-04-20	Nord	6.6 M_{w}	VII			Significant damage	
1953-01-25		5.7		2		Moderate damage	
1887-09-23	Môle-Saint-Nicolas					Severe damage / tsunami	
1864-05-19	Jacmel					Moderate damage / tsunami	
1860-04-08	Anse-à-Veau					Moderate damage / tsunami	
1842-05-07	Cap-Haïtien	8.1 M_{s}		5,300		Extreme damage / destructive tsunami	
1784-07-29	Port-au-Prince–Léogâne–Petit-Goâve					Severe damage	
1775-12-18						Minimal damage / tsunami	
March 1775						Minimal damage / tsunami	
1770-06-03	Port-au-Prince	7.5 M_{w}		250+		Severe damage / tsunami	
1751-11-21	Port-au-Prince	8.0 M_{s}				Severe damage	
1751-09-15	Port-au-Prince					Moderate damage / tsunami	
1701-11-09	Léogâne–Petit-Goâve					Moderate damage	
1562-12-02		7.7 M_{I}				Concepción de la Vega destroyed	
Note: The inclusion criteria for adding events are based on WikiProject Earthquakes' notability guideline that was developed for stand alone articles. The principles described also apply to lists. In summary, only damaging, injurious, or deadly events should be recorded.

== See also ==
- Enriquillo–Plantain Garden fault zone
- Geology of Haiti
- Lists of earthquakes
