= Lycée Jacques Prévert =

Lycée Jacques Prevert may refer to:

France:

- Lycée Jacques Prevert (Boulogne-Billancourt), a Lycée school in Boulogne-Billancourt, France
- Lycée Jacques Prévert - Fontaine
- Lycée Jacques Prevert - Longjumeau, Essonne (Paris area)
- Lycée Jacques Prévert - Savenay
- Lycée Jacques Prévert - Pont-Audemer
- Lycée Jacques Prevert - Taverny, Val-d'Oise (Paris area)

Haiti:

- Lycée Jacques Prevert - Miragoâne, Nippes
