= Jean Ernest Muscadin =

Haitian prosecutor

Jean Ernest Muscadin is a Haitian public prosecutor in Miragoâne.

== Early life ==
Born in the 1970s in Les Cayes, Muscadin studied at L’école National Michel Lazard from 1980 to 1986, then going to Lycée Philippe Guerrier in Les Cayes and graduating from Lycée Jean Jacques Dessalines in Port-au-Prince in 1996. Muscadin received his degree in law from l’École de Droit et des Sciences économiques des Cayes in 2004, allegedly completing his thesis on the need for the death penalty in Haiti, which was made illegal by the Constitution of 1987.

== Career ==
Muscadin was installed as Government Commissioner by the Jovenel Moïse administration on January 31, 2020. After his appointment, several local lawyers in Miragoâne protested the choice, declaring that he was unfit for the position. He has come under fire from human rights groups for extrajudicial repression of government opponents, including arresting demonstrators, and, in one case, personally using physical force on a woman illegally selling fuel by the gallon.

In 2023, Muscadin received a reprimand from the Ministry of Justice for acting without following higher orders and ordering individuals to block a public highway without authority from his superiors, as well as unprofessional behavior in his interrogations of suspects.

In the ongoing crisis in Haiti, Muscadin has emerged as a public figure due to his hardline approach to gang violence. In August 2025, news that Muscadin might be dismissed from his post resulted in demonstrations in Miragoâne supporting him, arguing that he was helping to keep the area safe. In November 2025, a United Nations report accused him of carrying out at least 28 summary executions of suspected gang members through September 2025. In one of these executions, Muscadin allegedly shot an armed man himself in the middle of the street. Despite these allegations from the United Nations and human rights groups, Muscadin continues to enjoy popular support in Miragoâne, and the release of the UN report prompted further protests in his defense. One local lawyer described the allegations as "political persecution", and residents of the area have dubbed him the "people's prosecutor". Muscadin has defended his actions, saying, "All individuals killed in Nippes are murderers, terrorists."

Muscadin has since been suggested as a possible candidate for Haiti's planned elections in 2026. Although he has not declared his candidacy, protestors and members of the Haitian diaspora supporting him have called for him to run, with one protestor declaring, "Today, we are no longer talking about the commissioner, but rather President Muscadin. Everyone wants him to be the president of the country. We don't want people who lack backbone."
