= Ted Musgrave =

American stock car racing driver

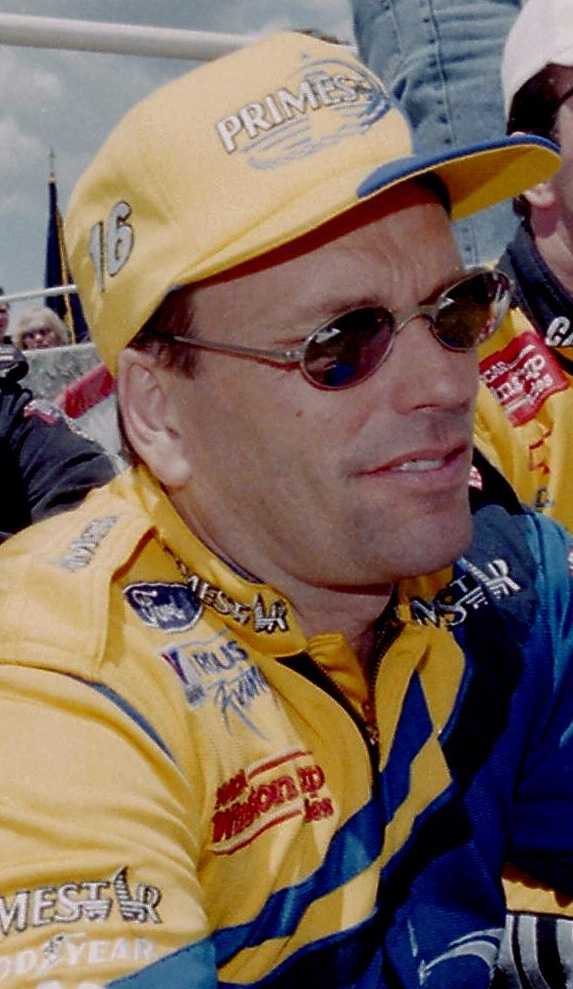
- Musgrave in 1998
- Born: Theodore David Musgrave Sr. December 18, 1955 (age 70); Waukegan, Illinois, U.S.
- Achievements: 2005 Craftsman Truck Series champion 1988 Snowball Derby winner
- Awards: 1987 ASA National Tour Rookie of the Year

NASCAR Cup Series career
- 305 races run over 14 years
- Best finish: 7th (1995)
- First race: 1990 Champion Spark Plug 400 (Michigan)
- Last race: 2003 Sharpie 500 (Bristol)
Wins	Top tens	Poles
0	55	5

NASCAR O'Reilly Auto Parts Series career
- 22 races run over 8 years
- Best finish: 53rd (2000)
- First race: 1989 All Pro 300 (Rockingham)
- Last race: 2006 O'Reilly Challenge (Texas)
Wins	Top tens	Poles
0	2	0

NASCAR FedEx Freight Truck Series career
- 192 races run over 11 years
- Best finish: 1st (2005)
- First race: 1995 GM Goodwrench/Delco Battery 200 (Phoenix)
- Last race: 2010 NextEra Energy Resources 250 (Daytona)
- First win: 2001 Florida Dodge Dealers 400K (Homestead)
- Last win: 2007 Silverado 350K (Texas)
Wins	Top tens	Poles
17	119	12

NASCAR Canada Series career
- 1 race run over 1 year
- Best finish: 73rd (2002)
- First race: 2002 Canada Day Shootout (Cayuga)
Wins	Top tens	Poles
0	0	0
- Statistics up to date as of April 23, 2013.

Theodore David Musgrave Sr. (born December 18, 1955) is an American former stock car racing driver.

== Pre-NASCAR ==
Musgrave's father, Elmer, was a famous short-track racer in the Midwest who raced for over 25 years at Soldier Field, O'Hare, Waukegan, and Wilmot, Wisconsin before moving into asphalt late models in the American Speed Association (ASA) and ARCA. "I was really young at the time," Musgrave said. "But I can still remember sitting in the infield at Milwaukee and watching him race against drivers like Paul Goldsmith. He finally retired so he could help my older brother, Tom, and I get started." He began racing in 1977 at the age of 22 at Waukegan in a 1967 Ford Galaxy that he inherited from his brother. He immediately rebuilt the car into a 1967 Ford Torino and won the track's rookie of the year award. He and his father built a Ford Mustang using some tips from Dick Trickle to race the next season.

By 1979, Musgrave was a regular driver on the Central Wisconsin (CWRA) circuit, finishing seventh in the season points. Originally from Illinois, Musgrave moved across the nearby state line so that he could race five nights per week in the CWRA. He raced at LaCrosse, State Park Speedway in Wausau, Grundy County Speedway, Wisconsin Dells Speedway (now Dells Raceway Park), and Waukegan. In 1980, he finished second in the points at Wisconsin International Raceway (WIR) behind Alan Kulwicki. Musgrave's highlight of the 1982 season was winning the Holiday 50 at Capital Speedway (now Madison International Speedway). Musgrave qualified the fastest five times in a row at WIR and was leading the points when he battered his wrist in a wreck. He returned the following week in a cast with a special arm support in the car. He finished third in points. Musgrave won ten CWRA features in 1983, including the Holiday 50 at Capital Super Speedway, the Triple Hot Dog Dash at Wisconsin Dells, and the Race of Champions at Capital's Oktober Nationals. Musgrave won seven features at Capital in 1984, along with two features at LaCrosse, two at State Park, and two at Wisconsin Dells. He ran out of money to fund his team in 1985, and he ended his season early. Musgrave returned in 1986 with a new car which contained several of his experimental ideas. He finished tenth in CWRA points even though he started the season over a month late. He had numerous feature wins that season, including the Firecracker 100 at Capital.

In 1987, Musgrave moved to Franklin, Wisconsin and went national in the ASA series in Terry Baker's ride that Bobby Dotter vacated. Musgrave finished 21 of 25 events, winning at the Milwaukee Mile, Birmingham, and Huntsville. He earned rookie of the year honors by finishing fifth in points.

== NASCAR career ==
=== Winston Cup Series ===
In 1990, Musgrave was called upon by Winston Cup team owner Ray DeWitt to replace Rich Vogler, who had been killed at a wreck at Salem Speedway. Musgrave had four starts in the Cup Series that year, his best finish being a 22nd at the Checker Auto Parts 500. From 1991 to 1993, he raced the No. 55 for the DeWitt/Ulrich team. He was runner-up to Bobby Hamilton for rookie of the year in 1991 and had twelve top-ten finishes.

In 1992, driving for Dewitt/Ulrich, Musgrave led all Winston Cup drivers in laps completed. In 1994, he was hired by Jack Roush to race for Roush Racing in the No. 16 Family Channel Ford Thunderbird as a teammate to Mark Martin. In his first season, Musgrave had three poles and finished fifteenth in points. In 1995, Musgrave had a breakout year of sorts, posting seven top-five finishes (including two second-place finishes) and thirteen top-tens. At one point in the season, he was third in Winston Cup points. He slumped late in the season and finished seventh, but most felt his first race win was just around the corner. The 1996 season turned out to be a disappointment for Musgrave. He usually ran well in most races, but could never find what he needed to get his first win. He had several top-tens early in the season, but once again slumped in the second half and wound up seventeenth in points. He did, however, win the pole for the final Winston Cup race ever held at North Wilkesboro Speedway.

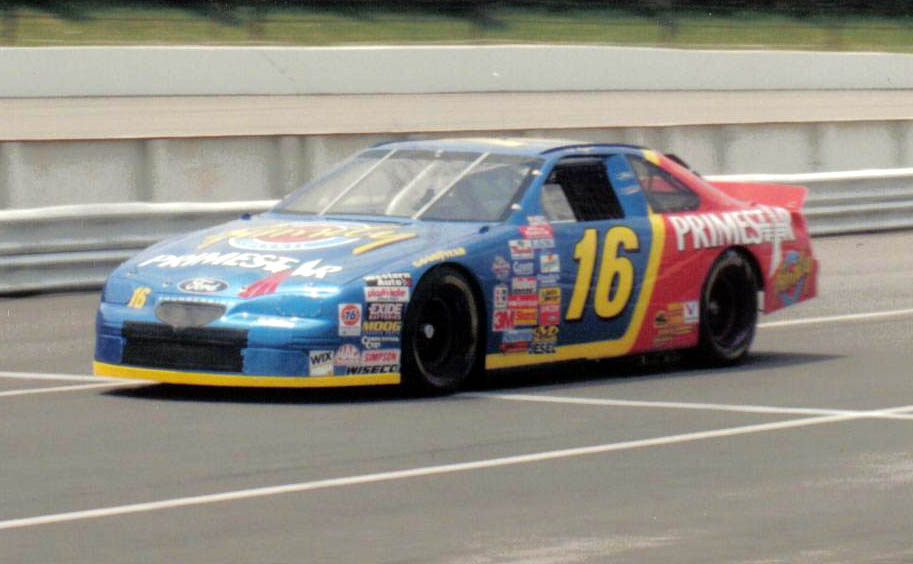
1997 racecar

In 1997, Roush vowed to give Musgrave whatever he needed to win his first race. The No. 16 car now had dual sponsorships from the Family Channel and Primestar. Once again, he started off well, and came very close to his first win, at Darlington Raceway. Musgrave was running second late in the race and clearly had a faster car than leader Dale Jarrett in the closing laps. At one point, he was side by side with Jarrett, but Jarrett held him off for the win. Critics of Musgrave said after the race that he should have been more aggressive and bumped Jarrett out of the way to get his first win. Later in the season at Pocono Raceway, Musgrave had a strong car and was running second late in the race with a chance to win when his car went unexpectedly loose. He ended up fourth. Musgrave was in the top-ten in points for most of 1997, but a poor final race, at Atlanta, caused him to fall to twelfth for the year.

In 1998, Musgrave got full sponsorship from Primestar, and was eighteenth in points when he was suddenly replaced by rookie Kevin Lepage, to the shock of many. Still, Musgrave filled out 1998 by running part-time for Bud Moore Engineering and Bill Elliott Racing (a team co-owned by Elliott and Dan Marino), as well as doing substitute duty for Travis Carter and Jasper Motorsports. He ended up missing only one race that year and gave Elliott's team its only top-ten finish with a fifth place run at Phoenix.

In 1999, Musgrave was signed by Butch Mock Motorsports to run the No. 75 Remington Arms-sponsored Ford. Musgrave struggled however, and only put together two top-ten finishes before finally quitting the team after the Pennzoil 400. He began 2000 without a ride, but soon caught on with Joe Bessey Motorsports filling in for the injured Geoff Bodine, and ran five races with that team. After a one-race return to the No. 15, Musgrave finished the year with Team SABCO, driving the No. 01 for Kenny Irwin Jr., who was killed in an accident at New Hampshire International Speedway while practicing for the race. Musgrave has run seven Cup races since then, six of them with Ultra Motorsports and one for Petty Enterprises, Musgrave's last Cup race came at the twenty-caution Sharpie 500 at Bristol in 2003, when he replaced Jimmy Spencer while he served his one race suspension.

=== Busch Series ===
Musgrave made his Busch Series debut in 1989 in the All Pro 300 at Charlotte Motor Speedway, driving the No. 98 Buick. He started 31st and wound up in twelfth place. He also ran at North Carolina Speedway the next week, finishing seventeenth. He did not return to the series until 1995, when he was fourteenth at Charlotte in the No. 9 Ford for Roush Racing. In 1997, Musgrave finished 12th at Darlington Raceway in the No. 40 Ford for Doug Taylor. He also returned for another race in the No. 9 Roush Ford, finishing 36th at Talladega. Musgrave attempted four races in 1999, but only qualified for one, finishing seventeenth at Rockingham in the No. 29 Pep Boys Chevrolet for Gary Bechtel.

For 2000, Musgrave signed with Team SABCO to run nine races in the No. 82 Channellock Chevrolet. He earned three top-twenty finishes, including his first top-ten, an eighth at Charlotte Motor Speedway. Musgrave did not return to the series until 2003, when he signed a one-race deal with Tommy Baldwin Racing in the No. 6 Dodge (originally it was supposed to be driven by Jimmy Spencer). In the Food City 250 at Bristol, he started ninth and finished third, earning a career-best finish for both him and the race team. Musgrave also ran one race in 2004, the Emerson Radio 250 at Richmond International Raceway. Driving the No. 86 Dodge, he started eleventh but finished 34th after overheating problems.

In 2006, Musgrave was one of many to drive the No. 12 and No. 14 Dodges for FitzBradshaw Racing. In five races, he was able to earn a best finish of 21st at Richmond. His final series race was that year's O'Reilly Challenge at Texas Motor Speedway, finishing 34th in the No. 14 Family Dollar Dodge.

=== Craftsman Truck Series ===
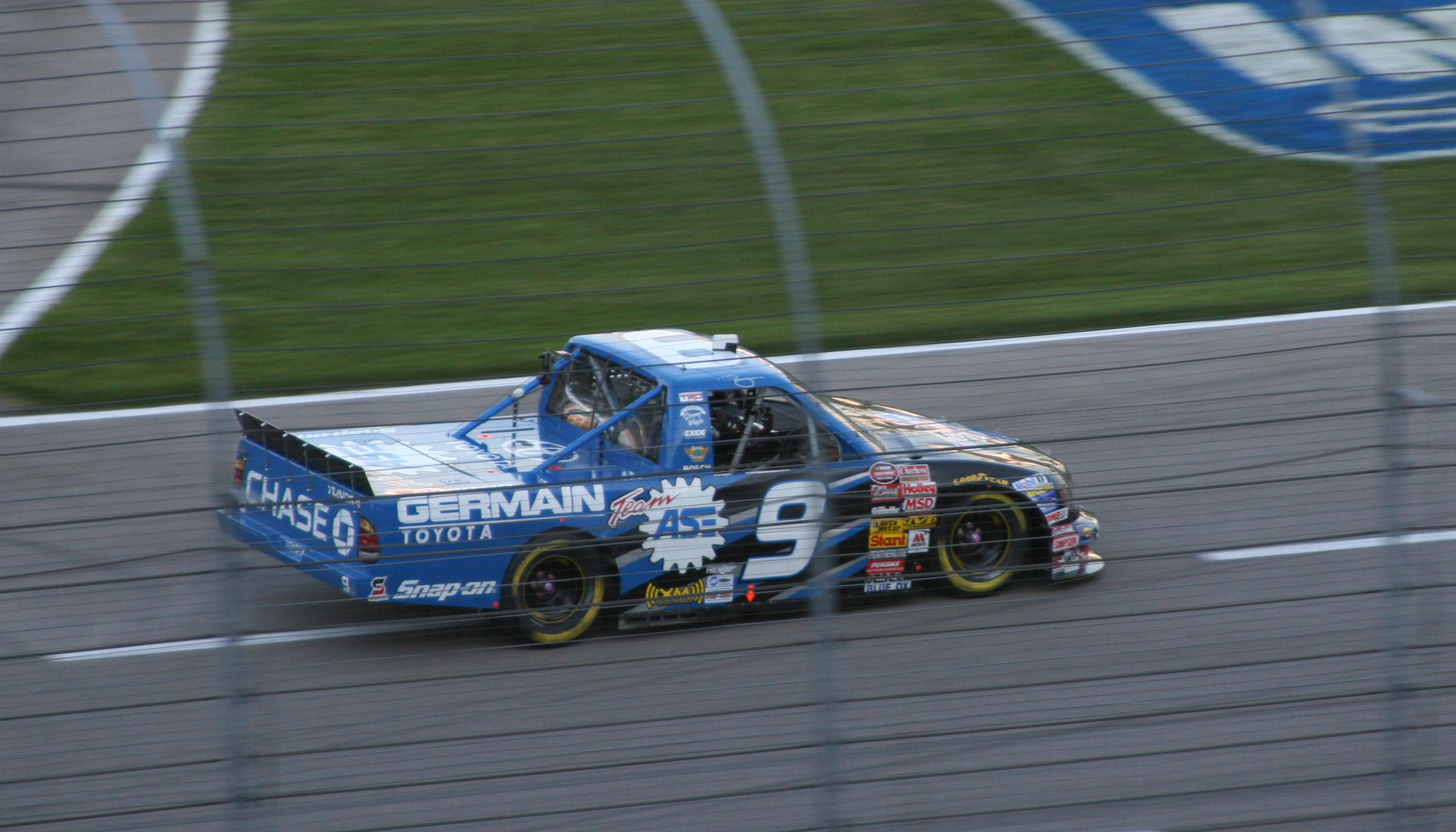
Musgrave's 2006 truck

Musgrave made his Craftsman Truck Series debut in 1995 at the GM Goodwrench/Delco Battery 200, driving the No. 61 Ford F-150 for Jack Roush. He started and finished in fourth place. He ran two more races the next year in Roush's No. 99 truck, and finished fifth at Phoenix. He did not run trucks again until 2001, when he signed to drive the No. 1 Mopar Dodge Ram for Ultra Motorsports full-time. He won three of out the first five races that year and seven races overall, and had 18 Top 10 finishes, but was unable to catch Jack Sprague for the title and would finish second in the point standings. The next two seasons, he had three wins apiece and finished third in both seasons' points. During the 2003 season, Musgrave announced that he had been battling bladder cancer while racing. His wife Debi had been diagnosed with leukemia since 2000. Musgrave appeared to be in position to win the truck championship that year, but in the season-ending Ford 200, Musgrave was penalized for attempting to pass a slower truck low on the final restart past the start-finish line, and surrendered the championship to fellow Wisconsinite Travis Kvapil. "All I can say is next year you're going to see a whole new Ted Musgrave. He's going to be the dirtiest son of a gun going out there on the racetrack and you might as well throw that rulebook away. I ain't going by it no more", Musgrave said in reaction to the penalty.

In 2004, Musgrave did not race dirty as promised, but still raced competitively, winning two races and finishing 3rd in points for the third consecutive year, behind Bobby Hamilton and Dennis Setzer.

In 2005, Musgrave won just one race, winning from the pole position at Gateway International Raceway as he did also in 2001, but he was able to claim the Craftsman Truck Series title. Musgrave moved on to Germain Racing's No. 9 Toyota for 2006 with sponsorship from Team ASE after Ultra Motorsports closed the doors following the 2005 season. Musgrave finished sixth in points in 2006, but failed to win a race that season.

In 2006, he was chosen to drive in the International Race Of Champions for the first time. He was the only driver representing the Craftsman Truck Series for the 2006 season. In 2007, Musgrave was parked for one race after hitting Kelly Bires out of anger under a caution at the Milwaukee Mile. He was parked, fined, and docked points, ending any legitimate shot he had to make a run at the championship. Brad Keselowski was named the replacement driver at Memphis Motorsports Park. That marked the first time in Craftsman Truck Series history that a driver had been suspended from a race. Later that season, Musgrave got his first career win for Germain Racing at Texas Motor Speedway, breaking a 66-race winless streak. Despite the one-race suspension, Musgrave finished seventh in the series points, marking seven consecutive top-ten points finishes in the Craftsman Truck Series.

After the conclusion of the 2007 season, Germain Racing announced that they would not renew Musgrave's contract for 2008 season. Musgrave was replaced in the No. 9 by rookie Justin Marks. He moved to HT Motorsports for 2008, bringing his ASE sponsorship with him to the No. 59 truck. Eighteen races into the 2008 season, Musgrave and HT parted ways after a practice wreck at Las Vegas Motor Speedway. He was thirteenth in points at the time of his release.

In 2010, Musgrave was entered in the season-opening NextEra Energy Resources 250 at Daytona. Driving the No. 15 Hope for Haiti-sponsored Toyota for Billy Ballew Motorsports, he started eighteenth but finished 31st after getting caught in an early multi-car wreck.

Musgrave served as Ron Hornaday Jr.'s spotter for eight races during the 2012 Camping World Truck Series season. A March 2012 press release stated that Musgrave had retired from driving.

== Personal life ==
Musgrave married the former Deborah Pantle. They met while traveling back and forth from Waukegan on Sunday nights. "She was a friend of a friend of my father who needed a ride back to Illinois on Sunday nights," he said. After they married, she trained and showed horses while he raced. They have two sons, Justin and Ted, Jr., and a daughter, Brittany. Justin raced light trucks, and Ted, Jr. raced on the ASA tour.

== Motorsports career results ==
=== NASCAR ===
(key) (Bold – Pole position awarded by qualifying time. Italics – Pole position earned by points standings or practice time. * – Most laps led.)

==== Sprint Cup Series ====
NASCAR Sprint Cup Series results
Year	Team	No.	Make	1	2	3	4	5	6	7	8	9	10	11	12	13	14	15	16	17	18	19	20	21	22	23	24	25	26	27	28	29	30	31	32	33	34	35	36	NSCC	Pts	Ref
1990	Ted Musgrave Racing	50	Chevy	DAY	RCH	CAR	ATL	DAR	BRI	NWS	MAR	TAL	CLT	DOV	SON	POC	MCH	DAY	POC	TAL	GLN	MCH; 39	BRI	DAR	RCH	DOV	MAR	NWS	CLT	CAR; 37										49th	280	
1990	U.S. Motorsports Inc.	2	Chevy																												PHO; 22									49th	280	
1990	U.S. Motorsports Inc.	2	Pontiac																													ATL; 26								49th	280	
1991	U.S. Motorsports Inc.	55	Pontiac	DAY; 30	RCH; 19	CAR; 25	ATL; 37	DAR; 21	BRI; 12	NWS; 17	MAR; 24	TAL; 16	CLT; 17	DOV; 18	SON; 37	POC; 27	MCH; 21	DAY; 37	POC; 13	TAL; 26	GLN; 26	MCH; 17	BRI; 16	DAR; 20	RCH; 22	DOV; 14	MAR; 20	NWS; 22	CLT; 14	CAR; 21	PHO; 18	ATL; 30								23rd	2841	
1992	RaDiUs Motorsports	55	Chevy	DAY; 8			ATL; 19					TAL; 21						DAY; 16		TAL; 12																				18th	3315	
1992	RaDiUs Motorsports	55	Olds		CAR; 17	RCH; 25			BRI; 14	NWS; 19	MAR; 20				SON; 22																									18th	3315	
1992	RaDiUs Motorsports	55	Pontiac					DAR; 15																																18th	3315	
1992	RaDiUs Motorsports	55	Ford										CLT; 8	DOV; 16		POC; 33	MCH; 8		POC; 5		GLN; 11	MCH; 25	BRI; 22	DAR; 30	RCH; 10	DOV; 8	MAR; 12	NWS; 14	CLT; 11	CAR; 29	PHO; 24	ATL; 9								18th	3315	
1993	RaDiUs Motorsports	55	Ford	DAY; 15	CAR; 7	RCH; 17	ATL; 19	DAR; 30	BRI; 15	NWS; 24	MAR; 28	TAL; 28	SON; 39	CLT; 26	DOV; 14	POC; 5	MCH; 15	DAY; 10	NHA; 24	POC; 33	TAL; 33	GLN; 34	MCH; 5	BRI; DNQ	DAR; 34	RCH; 22	DOV; 28	MAR; 31	NWS; 29	CLT; 21	CAR; 28	PHO; 15	ATL; 8							25th	2853	
1994	Roush Racing	16	Ford	DAY; 38	CAR; 13	**RCH**; 13	ATL; 11	DAR; 10	BRI; 19	NWS; 21	MAR; 10	TAL; 11	SON; 6	CLT; 16	DOV; 35	POC; 15	MCH; 9	DAY; 14	NHA; 7	POC; 32	TAL; 41	IND; 13	GLN; 19	MCH; 24	BRI; 11	DAR; 39	**RCH**; 17	DOV; 14	**MAR**; 9	NWS; 9	CLT; 18	CAR; 13	PHO; 5	ATL; 28						13th	3477	
1995	Roush Racing	16	Ford	DAY; 4	CAR; 33	RCH; 13	ATL; 19	DAR; 3	BRI; 18	NWS; 6	MAR; 2	TAL; 11	SON; 6	CLT; 15	DOV; 3	POC; 2	MCH; 10	DAY; 5	NHA; 8	POC; 4	TAL; 11	IND; 16	GLN; 13	MCH; 28	BRI; 13	DAR; 22	RCH; 10	DOV; 11	MAR; 29	**NWS**; 20	CLT; 19	CAR; 22	PHO; 6	ATL; 27						7th	3949	
1996	Roush Racing	16	Ford	DAY; 7	CAR; 31	RCH; 3	ATL; 18	DAR; 7	BRI; 25	NWS; 12	MAR; 9	TAL; 8	SON; 23	CLT; 30	DOV; 13	POC; 19	MCH; 8	DAY; 13	NHA; 11	POC; 19	TAL; 36	IND; 21	GLN; 12	MCH; 23	BRI; 12	DAR; 29	RCH; 15	DOV; 33	MAR; 20	**NWS**; 19	CLT; 17	CAR; 18	PHO; 4	ATL; 31						16th	3466	
1997	Roush Racing	16	Ford	DAY; 13	CAR; 12	RCH; 20	ATL; 34	DAR; 2	TEX; 35	BRI; 38	MAR; 24	SON; 11	TAL; 24	CLT; 23	DOV; 11	POC; 6	MCH; 4*	CAL; 4	DAY; 12	NHA; 26	POC; 4	IND; 33	GLN; 6	MCH; 3	BRI; 15	DAR; 29	RCH; 9	NHA; 30	DOV; 24	MAR; 21	CLT; 17	TAL; 11	CAR; 32	PHO; 22	ATL; 31					12th	3556	
1998	Roush Racing	16	Ford	DAY; 20	CAR; 35	LVS; 6	ATL; 29	DAR; 10	BRI; 8	TEX; 30	MAR; 2	TAL; 42	CAL; 33	CLT; 12	DOV; 22	RCH; 15	MCH; 26	POC; 17	SON; 19	NHA; 39	POC; 15	IND; 19	GLN; 19																	23rd	3124	
1998	Moore-Robinson Motorsports	15	Ford																					MCH; 39			DAR; 43													23rd	3124	
1998	Travis Carter Enterprises	23	Ford																						BRI; 20	NHA														23rd	3124	
1998	American Equipment Racing	96	Chevy																									RCH; 25												23rd	3124	
1998	Elliott-Marino Racing	13	Ford																										DOV; 26		CLT; 27	TAL; 11	DAY; 34	PHO; 5	CAR; 19	ATL; 19				23rd	3124	
1998	Jasper Motorsports	77	Ford																											MAR; 15										23rd	3124	
1999	Butch Mock Motorsports	75	Ford	DAY; 15	CAR; 40	LVS; DNQ	ATL; 24	DAR; 29	TEX; 31	BRI; 7	MAR; 40	TAL; 28	CAL; 29	RCH; 11	CLT; 23	DOV; 24	MCH; 25	POC; 11	SON; 20	DAY; 35	NHA; 25	POC; 33	IND; 35	GLN; 27	MCH; 41	BRI; 16	DAR; 38	RCH; 8	NHA; 23	DOV; 28	MAR; 19	CLT; 31	TAL; 29	CAR; 32	PHO; 29	HOM; 42	ATL			33rd	2689	
2000	Joe Bessey Motorsports	60	Chevy	DAY	CAR; 16	LVS; 26	ATL; 27	DAR; 42	BRI; 43	TEX	MAR																													40th	1614	
2000	Fenley-Moore Motorsports	15	Ford									TAL; 35	CAL	RCH	CLT; DNQ	DOV	MCH	POC	SON	DAY	NHA																			40th	1614	
2000	Team SABCO	01	Chevy																			POC; 16	IND; 24	GLN	MCH; 26	BRI; 17	DAR; 13	RCH; 21	NHA; 14	DOV; 23	MAR; 21	CLT; 29	TAL; 32	CAR; DNQ	PHO; 25	HOM; DNQ	ATL			40th	1614	
2001	Ultra Motorsports	7	Ford	DAY	CAR	LVS	ATL	DAR	BRI	TEX	MAR	TAL	CAL	RCH	CLT	DOV	MCH	POC; 29	SON	DAY	CHI	NHA	POC	IND	GLN	MCH	BRI	DAR	RCH	DOV	KAN	CLT	MAR	TAL	PHO	CAR	HOM	ATL	NHA	64th	76	
2002	Ultra Motorsports	07	Dodge	DAY	CAR	LVS	ATL	DAR	BRI	TEX	MAR	TAL	CAL	RCH	CLT	DOV	POC	MCH	SON	DAY	CHI	NHA	POC	IND; 21	GLN	MCH	BRI	DAR; 27	RCH	NHA	DOV	KAN	TAL	CLT	MAR; 29			PHO; DNQ	HOM; 16	50th	452	
2002	Petty Enterprises	44	Dodge																																	ATL; 28	CAR			50th	452	
2003	Ultra Motorsports	07	Dodge	DAY	CAR	LVS	ATL	DAR	BRI	TEX	TAL	MAR	CAL	RCH	CLT	DOV	POC	MCH	SON	DAY	CHI	NHA	POC	IND; DNQ	GLN	MCH														68th	70	
2003	Ultra Motorsports	7	Dodge																								BRI; 31	DAR	RCH	NHA	DOV	TAL	KAN	CLT	MAR	ATL	PHO	CAR	HOM	68th	70	
2010	Robby Gordon Motorsports	7	Toyota	DAY	CAL	LVS	ATL	BRI	MAR	PHO	TEX	TAL	RCH	DAR	DOV	CLT	POC; DNQ	MCH	SON	NHA	DAY	CHI	IND	POC	GLN	MCH	BRI	ATL	RCH	NHA										NA	-	
2010	Prism Motorsports	66	Toyota																												DOV; DNQ	KAN	CAL	CLT	MAR	TAL	TEX	PHO	HOM	NA	-	

===== Daytona 500 =====
Year	Team	Manufacturer	Start	Finish
1991	U.S. Motorsports Inc.	Pontiac	37	30
1992	RaDiUs Motorsports	Chevrolet	40	8
1993	RaDiUs Motorsports	Ford	33	15
1994	Roush Racing	Ford	24	38
1995	Roush Racing	Ford	12	4
1996	Roush Racing	Ford	20	7
1997	Roush Racing	Ford	41	13
1998	Roush Racing	Ford	37	20
1999	Butch Mock Motorsports	Ford	27	15

==== Busch Series ====
NASCAR Busch Series results
Year	Team	No.	Make	1	2	3	4	5	6	7	8	9	10	11	12	13	14	15	16	17	18	19	20	21	22	23	24	25	26	27	28	29	30	31	32	33	34	35	NBSC	Pts	Ref
1989	Ted Musgrave Racing	98	Buick	DAY	CAR	MAR	HCY	DAR	BRI	NZH	SBO	LAN	NSV	CLT	DOV	ROU	LVL	VOL	MYB	SBO	HCY	DUB	IRP	ROU	BRI	DAR	RCH	DOV	MAR	CLT; 12	CAR; 17	MAR							79th	112	
1995	Roush Racing	9	Ford	DAY	CAR	RCH	ATL	NSV	DAR	BRI	HCY	NHA	NZH	CLT; 14	DOV	MYB	GLN	MLW	TAL	SBO	IRP	MCH	BRI	DAR	RCH	DOV	CLT	CAR	HOM										85th	121	
1997	Taylor Motorsports	40	Ford	DAY	CAR	RCH	ATL	LVS	DAR; 12	HCY	TEX	BRI	NSV																										78th	182	
1997	Roush Racing	9	Ford											TAL; 36	NHA	NZH	CLT	DOV	SBO	GLN	MLW	MYB	GTY	IRP	MCH	BRI	DAR	RCH	DOV	CLT	CAL	CAR	HOM						78th	182	
1999	Diamond Ridge Motorsports	29	Chevy	DAY; QL^{†}	CAR; 17	LVS; DNQ	ATL	DAR	TEX	NSV	BRI	TAL	CAL	NHA	RCH	NZH	CLT	DOV	SBO	GLN	MLW	MYB	PPR	GTY	IRP														102nd	112	
1999	Black Diamond Motorsports	82	Chevy																							MCH; DNQ	BRI												102nd	112	
1999	Specialty Racing	40	Chevy																									DAR; DNQ	RCH	DOV	CLT	CAR	MEM	PHO	HOM				102nd	112	
2000	Team SABCO	82	Chevy	DAY	CAR	LVS	ATL	DAR	BRI	TEX	NSV	TAL	CAL	RCH	NHA	CLT	DOV	SBO	MYB	GLN	MLW	NZH	PPR	GTY; 17	IRP; 21	MCH; 20	BRI; 37	DAR; 41	RCH; 27	DOV; 32	CLT; 8	CAR	MEM; 22	PHO	HOM				53rd	795	
2003	Tommy Baldwin Racing	6	Dodge	DAY	CAR	LVS	DAR	BRI	TEX	TAL	NSH	CAL	RCH	GTY	NZH	CLT	DOV	NSH	KEN	MLW	DAY	CHI	NHA	PPR	IRP	MCH	BRI; 3	DAR	RCH	DOV	KAN	CLT	MEM	ATL	PHO	CAR	HOM		98th	165	
2004	Houraney Racing	86	Dodge	DAY	CAR	LVS	DAR	BRI	TEX	NSH	TAL	CAL	GTY	RCH	NZH	CLT	DOV	NSH	KEN	MLW	DAY	CHI	NHA	PPR	IRP	MCH	BRI	CAL	RCH; 34	DOV	KAN	CLT	MEM	ATL	PHO	DAR	HOM		133rd	61	
2006	FitzBradshaw Racing	14	Dodge	DAY	CAL	MXC	LVS	ATL	BRI	TEX	NSH	PHO	TAL	RCH	DAR	CLT	DOV	NSH	KEN	MLW	DAY	CHI	NHA	MAR	GTY	IRP; 25	GLN	MCH	BRI	CAL	RCH; 21	DOV		CLT; 24	MEM	TEX; 34	PHO	HOM	71st	418	
2006	FitzBradshaw Racing	12	Dodge																														KAN; 30						71st	418	
^{†} - Qualified for Curtis Markham

==== Camping World Truck Series ====
NASCAR Camping World Truck Series results
Year	Team	No.	Make	1	2	3	4	5	6	7	8	9	10	11	12	13	14	15	16	17	18	19	20	21	22	23	24	25	NCWTC	Pts	Ref
1995	Roush Racing	61	Ford	PHO	TUS	SGS	MMR	POR	EVG	I70	LVL	BRI	MLW	CNS	HPT	IRP	FLM	RCH	MAR	NWS	SON	MMR	PHO; 4						70th	160	
1996	Roush Racing	99	Ford	HOM	PHO	POR	EVG	TUS	CNS	HPT	BRI	NZH	MLW	LVL	I70	IRP	FLM	GLN	NSV	RCH	NHA	MAR	NWS	SON	MMR	PHO; 5	LVS; 36		75th	210	
2001	Ultra Motorsports	1	Dodge	DAY; 22	HOM; 1*	**MMR**; 1*	MAR; 22	**GTY**; 1*	DAR; 31	PPR; 4	DOV; 4	TEX; 14	MEM; 6	MLW; 1	KAN; 2	KEN; 24*	NHA; 5	IRP; 23	NSH; 2	CIC; 7	NZH; 8	RCH; 4	SBO; 1*	TEX; 10	LVS; 1	PHO; 6	CAL; 1*		2nd	3597	
2002	Ultra Motorsports	1	Dodge	**DAY**; 2	DAR; 1*	**MAR**; 24*	GTY; 12	PPR; 16	DOV; 1*	TEX; 5	MEM; 3	MLW; 5	KAN; 5	KEN; 9	NHA; 4	MCH; 32	IRP; 16	NSH; 3*	RCH; 7	TEX; 6	**SBO**; 14*	LVS; 9	CAL; 1*	PHO; 2	HOM; 2*				3rd	3308	
2003	Ultra Motorsports	1	Dodge	DAY; 29	DAR; 2*	**MMR**; 5	**MAR**; 2	CLT; 1	DOV; 21	TEX; 13	MEM; 1*	MLW; 4	KAN; 15	KEN; 2	GTW; 7	MCH; 2	IRP; 6	NSH; 2	**BRI**; 15	RCH; 3*	NHA; 12	CAL; 1	LVS; 8	SBO; 3	TEX; 3	MAR; 10	**PHO**; 2	HOM; 13	3rd	3819	
2004	Ultra Motorsports	1	Dodge	DAY; 26	ATL; 8	MAR; 15	MFD; 13	CLT; 31	DOV; 12	**TEX**; 2*	MEM; 3*	**MLW**; 1*	KAN; 30	KEN; 7	GTW; 3	MCH; 2	IRP; 25	NSH; 3	BRI; 27	RCH; 1*	NHA; 7	LVS; 8	CAL; 2*	TEX; 6	MAR; 5*	PHO; 19*	DAR; 3	HOM; 2	3rd	3554	
2005	Ultra Motorsports	1	Dodge	DAY; 5	CAL; 5	ATL; 6	MAR; 7	**GTY**; 1*	MFD; 12	CLT; 3	DOV; 17	TEX; 14	MCH; 28	MLW; 3	KAN; 14	KEN; 5	MEM; 26	IRP; 14	NSH; 2	BRI; 6	RCH; 4	NHA; 3	LVS; 2	MAR; 4	ATL; 14	TEX; 14	PHO; 6	HOM; 19	1st	3535	
2006	Germain Racing	9	Toyota	DAY; 3	CAL; 3	ATL; 4	MAR; 2	GTY; 2	CLT; 4	MFD; 16	DOV; 18	TEX; 7	MCH; 23	MLW; 24	KAN; 22	KEN; 6	MEM; 19	IRP; 8	NSH; 4	BRI; 3	NHA; 31	LVS; 2	TAL; 3	MAR; 15*	ATL; 24	TEX; 11	PHO; 19	HOM; 33	6th	3314	
2007	Germain Racing	9	Toyota	DAY; 9	CAL; 5	ATL; 8	MAR; 5	KAN; 12	CLT; 5	MFD; 8	DOV; 20	TEX; 9	MCH; 5	MLW; 34	MEM	KEN; 3	IRP; 12	NSH; 8	BRI; 27	GTW; 3	NHA; 7	LVS; 15	TAL; 25	MAR; 8	ATL; 9	TEX; 1	PHO; 11	HOM; 18	7th	3183	
2008	HT Motorsports	59	Toyota	DAY; 28	CAL; 6	ATL; 7	MAR; 15	KAN; 10	CLT; 22	MFD; 17	DOV; 11	TEX; 28	MCH; 24	MLW; 19	MEM; 20	KEN; 13	IRP; 20	NSH; 8	BRI; 10	GTW; 10	NHA; 17	LVS	TAL	MAR	ATL	TEX	PHO	HOM	20th	2099	
2010	Billy Ballew Motorsports	15	Toyota	DAY; 31	ATL	MAR	NSH	KAN	DOV	CLT	TEX	MCH	IOW	GTY	IRP	POC	NSH	DAR	BRI	CHI	KEN	NHA	LVS	MAR	TAL	TEX	PHO	HOM	113th	70	

=== ARCA Permatex SuperCar Series ===
(key) (Bold – Pole position awarded by qualifying time. Italics – Pole position earned by points standings or practice time. * – Most laps led.)

ARCA Permatex SuperCar Series results
Year	Team	No.	Make	1	2	3	4	5	6	7	8	9	10	11	12	13	14	15	16	17	APSC	Pts	Ref
1989	Ted Musgrave Racing	98	Chevy	DAY; 9	ATL; 8	KIL	TAL; DNQ	FRS	POC	KIL	HAG	POC	TAL	DEL	FRS	ISF	TOL	DSF	SLM	ATL	76th	-	

=== International Race of Champions ===
(key) (Bold – Pole position. * – Most laps led.)

International Race of Champions results
Year	Make	1	2	3	4	Pos.	Pts	Ref
2006	Pontiac	DAY; 10	TEX; 9	**DAY**; 12	**ATL**; 5	11th	24	

Sporting positions
Preceded by Bobby Hamilton	NASCAR Craftsman Truck Series Champion; 2005	Succeeded by Todd Bodine
Achievements
Preceded by Butch Miller	Snowball Derby Winner; 1988	Succeeded by Rick Crawford
