= Plaisance-du-Sud =

Plaisance-du-Sud Plezans disid
- Commune
- Interactive map of Plaisance-du-Sud
- Location in Haiti
- Coordinates: 18°26′0″N 73°37′0″W
- Country: Haiti
- Department: Nippes
- Arrondissement: Anse-à-Veau

Area
  - Total: 107.97 km^{2} (41.69 sq mi)
- Elevation: 341 m (1,119 ft)

Population (2015)
  - Total: 27,245
  - Density: 252.34/km^{2} (653.55/sq mi)
- Time zone: UTC−05:00 (EST)
  - Summer (DST): UTC−04:00 (EDT)

Plaisance-du-Sud (French pronunciation: [plɛzɑ̃s dy syd]; Haitian Creole: Plezans disid) is a commune in the Anse-à-Veau Arrondissement, in the Nippes department of Haiti.
