= Lycée Jacques Prevert (Haiti) =

School in Miragoâne, Nippes, Haiti

Lycée Jacques Prevert is a high school in Miragoâne, Nippes, Haiti founded in 1981. It is a government project school.
