= Baradères =

Baradères Baradè
- Commune
- Nickname: Le Grenier d'Haïti (The breadbasket of Haiti)
- Interactive map of Baradères
- Location within Haiti
- Coordinates: 18°28′57″N 73°38′19″W
- Country: Haiti
- Department: Nippes
- Arrondissement: Baradères

Area
  - Total: 192.71 km^{2} (74.41 sq mi)
- Elevation: 91 m (299 ft)

Population (2015)
  - Total: 41,245
  - Density: 214.03/km^{2} (554.33/sq mi)
- Time zone: UTC−05:00 (EST)
  - Summer (DST): UTC−04:00 (EDT)
- Postal code: HT 7520

Baraderes (French pronunciation: [baʁadɛʁ]; Haitian Creole: Baradè) is a commune in the Nippes department in the southwest part of Haiti. The town has a picturesque market square. There are few shops and no hotels.

The area economy is based on subsistence agriculture. A small association of subsistence farmers, Kafe Devlopman Barade, has exported coffee to the U.S. since 2008. The town, set in a river valley, is vulnerable to flooding. The road to Baradères through the mountains is very rough and is usually accessible only by lorries or high-clearance, four-wheel-drive vehicles. Baradères is also accessible by boat from Petite Trou de Nippes, but sedimentation has made the Bay of Baradères very shallow in places and difficult to navigate—even by canoe. The river mouth is increasingly blocked by sediment.

This sediment is a result of severe soil erosion upstream. Primary causes of the erosion probably are riverbank scouring during heavy rainstorms, along with deforestation and cropping of hillsides in the Baradères River valley.

The most populous Localities in Baradères are principally Fond Tortue which is situated west of L'Étang another village in Baradères, Pays Perdu, Boisneau, Fond-Gondol, Sejour, Gaspard, Nan Renaud, Riviere Salee, Digoterie, Guardier, Bourjolly, Fond-Palmiste, Goulot, Palestine to quote only those.

== Administration ==
The municipality is made up of:

The City of Baradères

And the 5 municipal sections:

1st Section: Gérin or Mouton

2nd Section: Tet Dlo

3rd Section: Fond-Tortue (including the “Fond-Tortue” district)

4th Section: The Plain

5th Section: Rivière-Salée
