= Miragoâne Arrondissement =

Coordinates: 18.45°N 73.1°W

Miragoâne Arrondissement Arrondissement de Miragoâne Awondisman Miragwàn
- Arrondissement
- Interactive map of Miragoâne Arrondissement
- Country: Haiti
- Department: Nippes

Area
  - Arrondissement: 435.07 km^{2} (167.98 sq mi)
  - Urban: 10.63 km^{2} (4.10 sq mi)
  - Rural: 424.44 km^{2} (163.88 sq mi)

Population (2015)
  - Arrondissement: 141,826
  - Density: 325.98/km^{2} (844.30/sq mi)
  - Urban: 27,951
  - Rural: 113,875
- Time zone: UTC-5 (Eastern)
- Postal code: HT74—
- Communes: 4
- Communal Sections: 14
- IHSI Code: 101

Miragoâne (Haitian Creole: Miragwàn) is an arrondissement in the Nippes department of Haiti. As of 2015, the population was 141,826 inhabitants. Postal codes in the Miragoâne Arrondissement start with the number 74.

The arrondissement consists of the following communes:

- Miragoâne
- Fonds-des-Nègres
- Paillant
- Petite-Rivière-de-Nippes
