= Paillant =

Paillant Payan
- Commune
- Interactive map of Paillant
- Location in Haiti
- Coordinates: 18°25′0″N 73°9′0″W
- Country: Haiti
- Department: Nippes
- Arrondissement: Miragoâne

Area
  - Total: 63.27 km^{2} (24.43 sq mi)
- Elevation: 589 m (1,932 ft)

Population (2015)
  - Total: 17,332
  - Density: 273.9/km^{2} (709.5/sq mi)
- Time zone: UTC−05:00 (EST)
  - Summer (DST): UTC−04:00 (EDT)
- Postal code: HT 7412

Paillant (French pronunciation: [pajɑ̃]; Haitian Creole: Payan) is a commune in the Miragoâne Arrondissement, in the Nippes department of Haiti.
