= Anse-à-Veau Arrondissement =

Coordinates: 18.5167°N 73.35°W

Anse-à-Veau Arrondissement Arrondissement d'Anse-à-Veau Awondisman Ansavo
- Arrondissement
- Interactive map of Anse-à-Veau Arrondissement
- Country: Haiti
- Department: Nippes

Area
  - Arrondissement: 595.50 km^{2} (229.92 sq mi)
  - Urban: 50.25 km^{2} (19.40 sq mi)
  - Rural: 545.25 km^{2} (210.52 sq mi)

Population (2015)
  - Arrondissement: 153,639
  - Density: 258.00/km^{2} (668.22/sq mi)
  - Urban: 25,188
  - Rural: 128,451
- Time zone: UTC-5 (Eastern)
- Postal code: HT75—
- Communes: 5
- Communal Sections: 16
- IHSI Code: 102

Anse-à-Veau (Haitian Creole: Ansavo) is an arrondissement in the Nippes Department of Haiti. As of 2015, the population was 153,639 inhabitants. Postal codes in the Anse-à-Veau Arrondissement start with the number 75.

The arrondissement consists of the following communes:

- Anse-à-Veau
- Arnaud
- L'Asile
- Petit-Trou-de-Nippes
- Plaisance-du-Sud
