= Arnaud, Haiti =

Arnaud: Arno
- Commune
- Interactive map of Arnaud
- Location in Haiti
- Coordinates: 18°27′0″N 73°23′0″W
- Country: Haiti
- Department: Nippes
- Arrondissement: Anse-à-Veau

Area
  - Total: 77.29 km^{2} (29.84 sq mi)
- Elevation: 79 m (259 ft)

Population (2015)
  - Total: 20,718
  - Density: 268.1/km^{2} (694.3/sq mi)
- Time zone: UTC−05:00 (EST)
  - Summer (DST): UTC−04:00 (EDT)

Arnaud (French pronunciation: [aʁno]; Haitian Creole: Arno) is a commune in the Anse-à-Veau Arrondissement, in the Nippes department of Haiti.
