= Petit-Trou-de-Nippes =

Petit-Trou-de-Nippes Ti Twou de Nip
- Commune
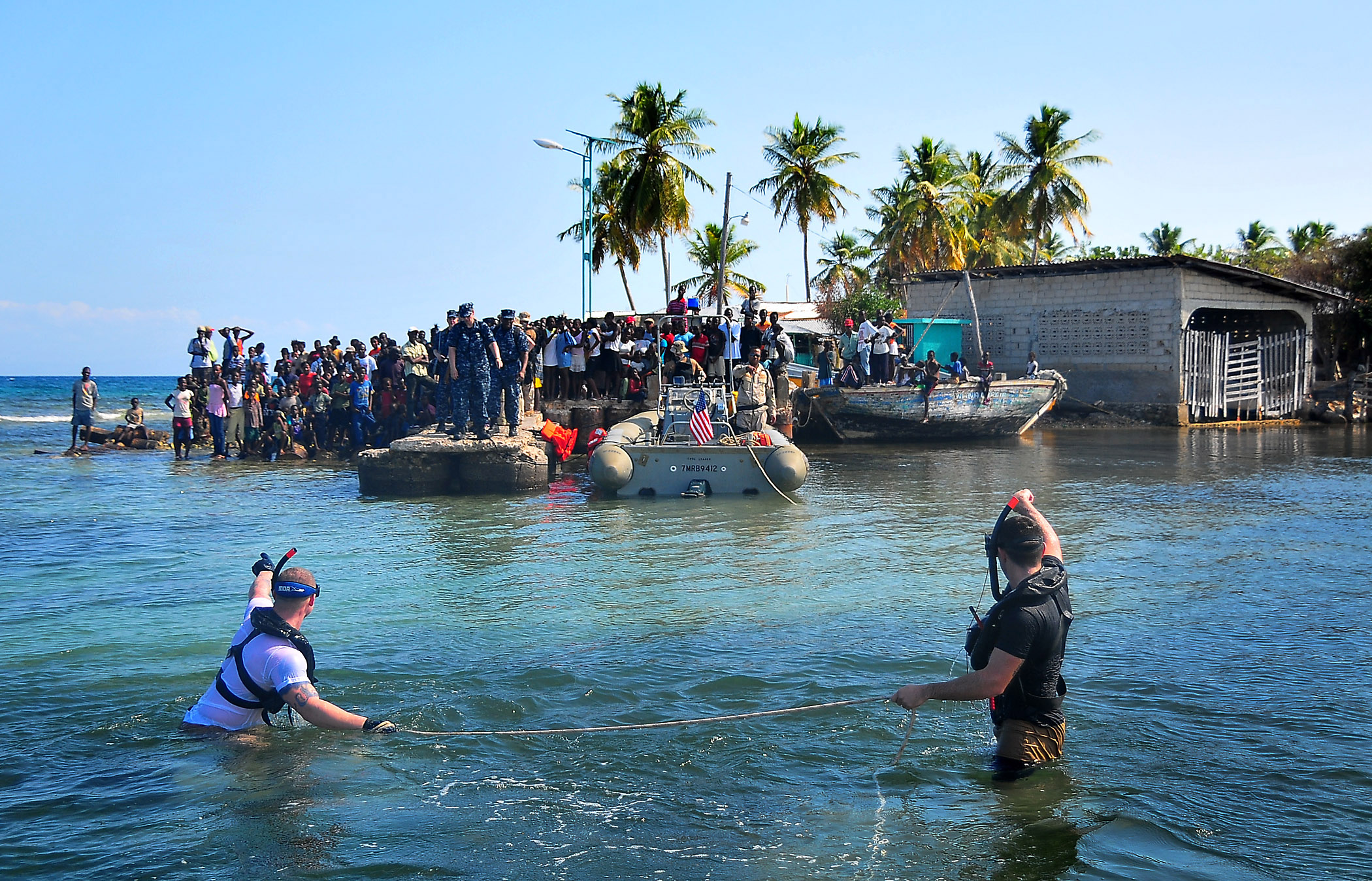
- Interactive map of Petit-Trou-de-Nippes
- Location in Haiti
- Coordinates: 18°31′36″N 73°30′31″W
- Country: Haiti
- Department: Nippes
- Arrondissement: Anse-à-Veau

Area
  - Total: 153.19 km^{2} (59.15 sq mi)
- Elevation: 0 m (0 ft)

Population (2015)
  - Total: 29,990
  - Density: 195.8/km^{2} (507.0/sq mi)
- Time zone: UTC−05:00 (EST)
  - Summer (DST): UTC−04:00 (EDT)
- Postal code: HT 7530

Petit-Trou-de-Nippes (French pronunciation: [pəti tʁu də nip]; Haitian Creole: Ti Twou de Nip) is a commune in the Anse-à-Veau Arrondissement, in the Nippes department of Haiti. It has 29,990 inhabitants (2015).

On 14 August 2021 it was near the epicenter of a magnitude 7.2 earthquake that has killed at least 2,207 people and injured 12,268 more. The earthquake caused irreparable damage to the only health center in Petit Trou de Nippes. In October 2023, a U.S.-based nonprofit named Locally Haiti began building a new Community Hospital and Health Center in partnership with local leaders.

In 1963, the commune was devastated by Hurricane Flora, destroying 85% of the village.

The town's name means "Little hole of Nippes".
