= Gabriel Fortuné =

Haitian politician (died 2021)

Jean Gabriel Fortuné (died 14 August 2021) was a Haitian politician, who served as the mayor of Les Cayes and senator. He was also a National Palace advisor and departmental delegate. In 2019, he delivered the offer of a conditional resignation by Haiti's president, Jovenel Moïse.

In 1995, he was wounded during political unrest in Haiti's capital, Port-au-Prince.

In 2008, when he was a senator, people protesting food prices stormed his home. In 2016, as a mayoral candidate, he pledged to replace all the latrines in Les Cayes with flush toilets. In 2016, he criticized the speed of the central government's hurricane response after a police clash with protesters caused the death of a boy in Les Cayes.

He announced his resignation as mayor in 2018 stating that protests had endangered his family. His resignation was refused 100 days later.

Fortuné died during the earthquake that struck Haiti on 14 August 2021. He was at a hotel during that time, which collapsed during the quake. Rescuers found him dead under the rubble hours later.
