= Petite-Rivière-de-Nippes =

Petite-Rivière-de-Nippes Piti Rivyè de Nip
- Commune
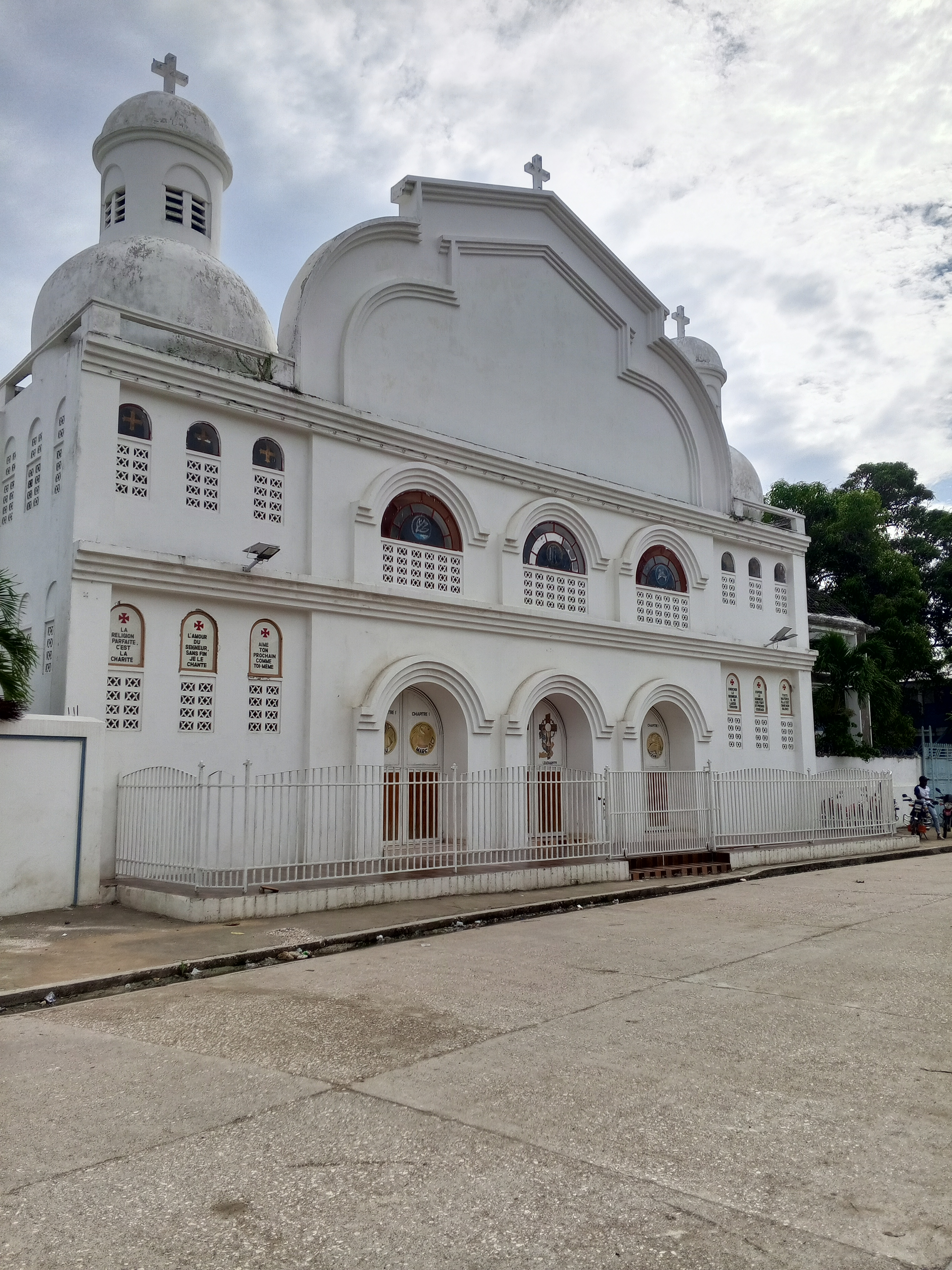
- Interactive map of Petite-Rivière-de-Nippes
- Location in Haiti
- Coordinates: 18°28′32″N 73°14′2″W
- Country: Haiti
- Department: Nippes
- Arrondissement: Miragoâne

Area
  - Total: 93.7 km^{2} (36.2 sq mi)
- Elevation: 0 m (0 ft)

Population (2015)
  - Total: 28,553
  - Density: 305/km^{2} (789/sq mi)
- Time zone: UTC−05:00 (EST)
  - Summer (DST): UTC−04:00 (EDT)
- Postal code: HT 7420

Petite-Rivière-de-Nippes (French pronunciation: [pətit ʁivjɛʁ də nip]; Haitian Creole: Piti Rivyè de Nip) is a commune in the Miragoâne Arrondissement, in the Nippes department of Haiti. It has 28,553 inhabitants. Petite-Rivière-de-Nippes is one of the 28 communes in which the Pan American Development Foundation implements the Government of Haiti's Project for Participatory Development (PRODEP).
