= L'Asile =

L'Asile Lazil
- Commune
- Interactive map of L'Asile
- Location in Haiti
- Coordinates: 18°23′0″N 73°25′0″W
- Country: Haiti
- Department: Nippes
- Arrondissement: Anse-à-Veau

Area
  - Total: 153.82 km^{2} (59.39 sq mi)
- Elevation: 125 m (410 ft)

Population (2015)
  - Total: 41,073
  - Density: 267.02/km^{2} (691.58/sq mi)
- Time zone: UTC−05:00 (EST)
  - Summer (DST): UTC−04:00 (EDT)
- Postal code: HT 7540

L'Asile (French pronunciation: [lazil]; Haitian Creole: Lazil) is a commune in the Anse-à-Veau Arrondissement, in the Nippes department of Haiti. It has 41,073 inhabitants in 2015.

The name comes from French meaning "the asylum". Probably it was used for an asylum during the colonial era.
