= Fonds-des-Nègres =

Fonds-des-Nègres Fondènèg
- Commune
- Interactive map of Fonds-des-Nègres
- Location in Haiti
- Coordinates: 18°21′0″N 73°14′0″W
- Country: Haiti
- Department: Nippes
- Arrondissement: Miragoâne

Area
  - Total: 92.23 km^{2} (35.61 sq mi)
- Elevation: 396 m (1,299 ft)

Population (2015)
  - Total: 33,413
  - Density: 362.3/km^{2} (938.3/sq mi)
- Time zone: UTC−05:00 (EST)
  - Summer (DST): UTC−04:00 (EDT)
- Postal code: HT 7413

Fonds-des-Nègres (French pronunciation: [fɔ̃ de nɛɡʁ]; Haitian Creole: Fondènèg) is a commune in the Miragoâne Arrondissement, in the Nippes department of Haiti.

== Climate ==
Climate data for Fonds-des-Nègres
Month	Jan	Feb	Mar	Apr	May	Jun	Jul	Aug	Sep	Oct	Nov	Dec	Year
Mean daily maximum °C (°F)	28.8 (83.8)	28.7 (83.7)	28.9 (84.0)	29.0 (84.2)	28.9 (84.0)	29.9 (85.8)	30.4 (86.7)	30.5 (86.9)	30.5 (86.9)	29.6 (85.3)	28.8 (83.8)	28.2 (82.8)	29.4 (84.8)
Mean daily minimum °C (°F)	16.3 (61.3)	16.7 (62.1)	17.8 (64.0)	19.1 (66.4)	19.9 (67.8)	20.6 (69.1)	20.5 (68.9)	20.6 (69.1)	20.5 (68.9)	20.1 (68.2)	18.9 (66.0)	17.5 (63.5)	19.0 (66.3)
Average precipitation mm (inches)	46 (1.8)	45 (1.8)	61 (2.4)	126 (5.0)	192 (7.6)	129 (5.1)	119 (4.7)	185 (7.3)	155 (6.1)	216 (8.5)	97 (3.8)	33 (1.3)	1,404 (55.4)
Source: CLIMATE-DATA.ORG
