= Geology of Haiti =

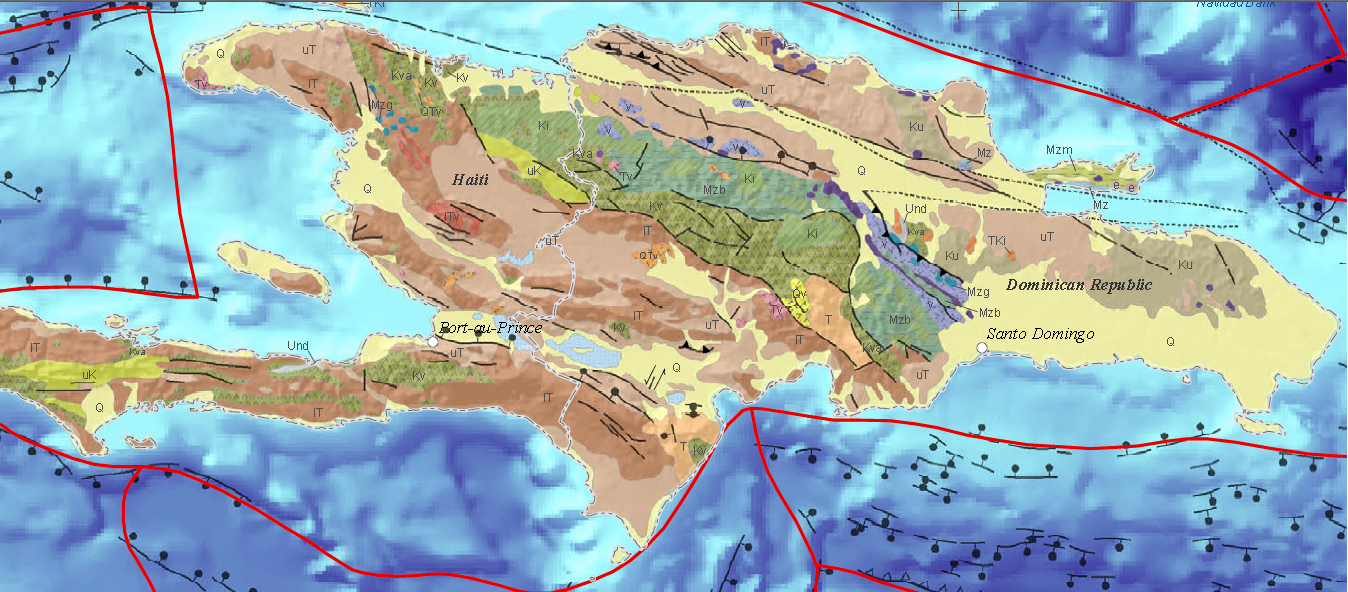
Geologic map of Hispaniola including Haiti. Mzb are Mesozoic amphibolites and associated metasedimentary rocks, Ki are Cretaceous plutons, Kv are Cretaceous volcanic rocks, uK are Upper Cretaceous marine strata, Ku are Cretaceous sedimentary and volcanic rocks, K are Cretaceous marine strata, IT are Eocene and/or Paleocene marine strata, uT are Post-Eocene marine strata, T are Tertiary marine strata, V are volcanic rocks, and Q are Quaternary alluvium.

The geology of Haiti is part of the broader geology of Hispaniola, an island in the Caribbean Sea, with rocks formed from multiple island arcs that have collided with North America.

== Geologic history, stratigraphy and tectonics ==
The oldest rocks on the island formed beginning in the early Cretaceous through island arc plutonism. Before the Aptian, the island was uplifted, particularly in the east, likely due to the collision of a volcanic island arc. In total, Hispaniola is formed from 11 distinct small island arcs. From the Albian to the Campanian, plutonism, metamorphism and volcanism began simultaneously, taking place underwater on the largely submerged landmass. In the Campanian a second arc collision took place.

Picrite from the Duarte Complex in central Hispaniola and the Enriched Basalts in southern Haiti have been inferred as Galapagos hotspot-type island plateau rocks.

The Beloc Formation on the southern peninsula of Haiti preserves tektites, with shocked quartz and plagioclase formed by the asteroid that struck the Yucatán Peninsula and caused the K-Pg mass extinction.

=== Cenozoic (66 million years ago-present) ===
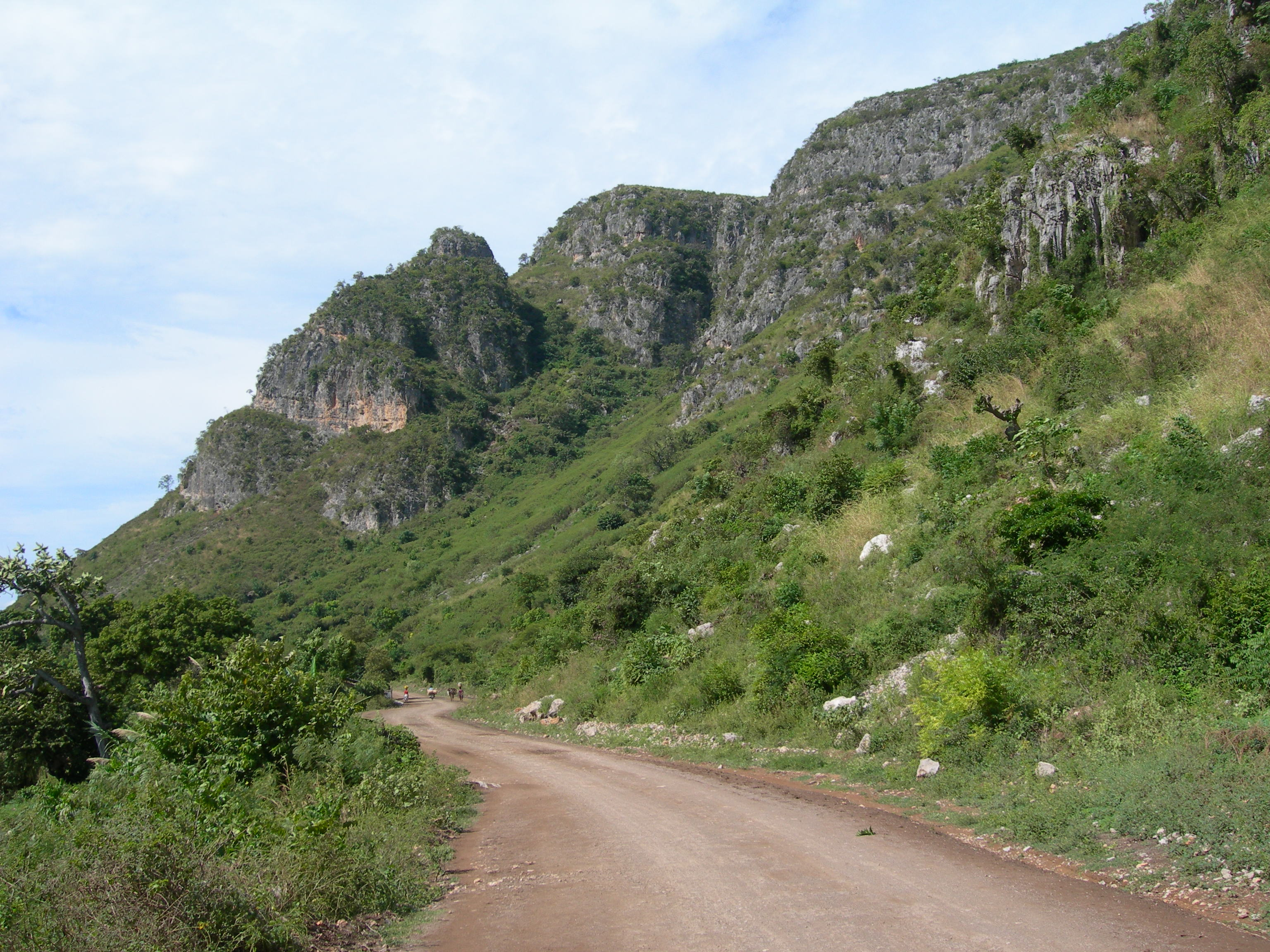
Rock outcrop in Haiti

Into the Paleogene at the start of the Cenozoic, volcanism, metamorphism and plutonism continued underwater until the Eocene, still largely below water. However, by the middle Eocene, the amalgamated island arcs collided with the southern margin of the North American Plate at the Florida-Bahama Platform, leading to the formation of extensive carbonates and the end of volcanism and plutonism. The island arc rocks became exposed above the water line and began to erode as an east-west strike-slip fault emerged.

From the Miocene to recent times, oblique strike-slip faults formed along the sutures between old island arcs as the island compressed against North America and oceanic plateau terranes. Nine large fault bounded mountain ranges formed.
