= 1770 Port-au-Prince earthquake =

Earthquake in modern-day Haiti

- Location within Haiti
- Local date: 3 June 1770
- Local time: 19:15
- Magnitude: 7.5M_{w}
- Depth: 10 km (6 mi)
- Epicenter: 18°25′N 72°47′W
- Areas affected: Saint-Domingue, Captaincy General of Santo Domingo, Jamaica
- Max. intensity: MMI X (Extreme)
- Tsunami: Yes
- Casualties: 250+

The 1770 Port-au-Prince earthquake took place at 7:15 pm local time on June 3, on the Enriquillo fault near Port-au-Prince, Saint-Domingue, the French colony that is now the country of Haiti.

== Damage ==
The earthquake was strong enough to destroy Port-au-Prince, and leveled all the buildings between Lake Miragoâne and Petit-Goâve, to the west of Port-au-Prince. The Plain of the Cul-de-Sac, a rift valley under Port-au-Prince that extends eastwards into the Dominican Republic, experienced extensive soil liquefaction. The ground under Port-au-Prince liquefied, throwing down all its buildings, including those that had survived the 1751 earthquake. One village, Croix des Bouquets, sank below sea level. Strong shocks were felt in Cap-Haïtien, about 160 kilometres (99 mi) away from the estimated epicenter in the Léogâne Arrondissement. Some chimneys on the distant island of Jamaica collapsed.

It is estimated that 200 people died in Port-au-Prince in collapsed buildings, including 79 of the 80 people in Port-au-Prince's hospital. The death toll would have been higher, but the earthquake was preceded by a rumbling noise that gave people time to flee their houses before the main tremor, which consisted of two shocks lasting a total of four minutes. Fifty people died in Léogâne.

== Tsunami ==
The earthquake generated a tsunami that came ashore along the Gulf of Gonâve, and rolled as much as 7.2 kilometres (4.5 mi) inland into the Cul-de-Sac depression, though this might have been confounded with the effects of the liquefaction.

== Aftermath ==
The aftermath of the earthquake saw much more death as thousands of slaves escaped in the chaos, the local economy collapsed and 15,000 slaves died in the subsequent famine. An additional 15,000 people died from what is thought to have been gastrointestinal anthrax from eating tainted meat bought from Spanish traders.

== See also ==
- List of earthquakes in Haiti
- List of historical earthquakes
- List of tsunamis
