= Miragoâne =

Miragoâne Miragwàn
- Commune
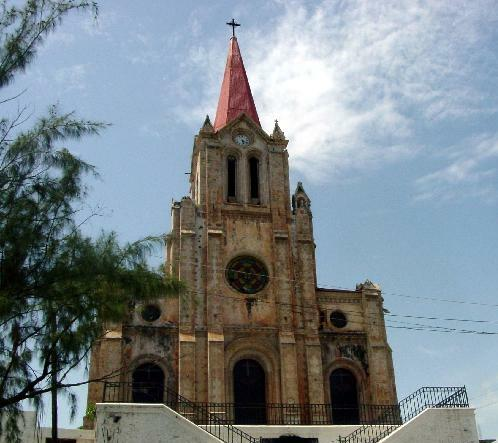
- Saint-Jean-Baptiste de Miragoâne Cathedral
- Interactive map of Miragoâne
- Location in Haiti
- Coordinates: 18°26′45″N 73°5′24″W
- Country: Haiti
- Department: Nippes
- Arrondissement: Miragoâne

Area
  - Total: 185.87 km^{2} (71.76 sq mi)
- Elevation: 0 m (0 ft)

Population (2015)
  - Total: 62,528
  - Density: 336.41/km^{2} (871.29/sq mi)
- Time zone: UTC-05:00 (EST)
  - Summer (DST): UTC-04:00 (EDT)
- Postal Code: HT 7410

Miragoâne (French pronunciation: [miʁaɡɔan]; Haitian Creole: Miragwàn) is a coastal commune in western Haiti and the capital of the Nippes department. It is also the headquarters of the Miragoâne Arrondissement. It is regarded as one of the major ports in the trade in used goods. Bales of used clothing, shoes, appliances and used cars arrive at the port from Miami and other U.S. cities. Local merchants in the informal sector buy boxes and bales of used goods to sort and resell them in street markets. Inexpensive merchandise is thus dispersed around Haiti.

== History ==
Miragoâne was founded in the 17th century by the English. It was once used as a rest stop for pirates. The city is named after the nearby lake, the Étang de Miragoâne, from the Taino name Miraguano.

The port was used by Reynolds Haitian Mines, a bauxite mining subsidiary of Reynolds Metals, which began shipping ore to the United States in 1957. It has been the site of a proposed collaboration between Max Hardberger and the Bigio family's GB Group for further port development.

In 1963, Miragoâne was devastated by Hurricane Flora.

In the midst of Haiti's gang crisis, Miragoâne's prosecutor, Jean Ernest Muscadin, has become a prominent Haitian figure due to his approach towards gang members, leading to some calls for him to run for president in 2026.

== 2024 explosion ==
On September 14 2024, A fuel tank overturned and exploded while bystanders were trying to collect gasoline killing 26 people and injuring 40.

== Education ==
- Lycée Jacques Prevert high school
