= Anse-à-Veau =

Anse-à-Veau: Ansavo
- Commune
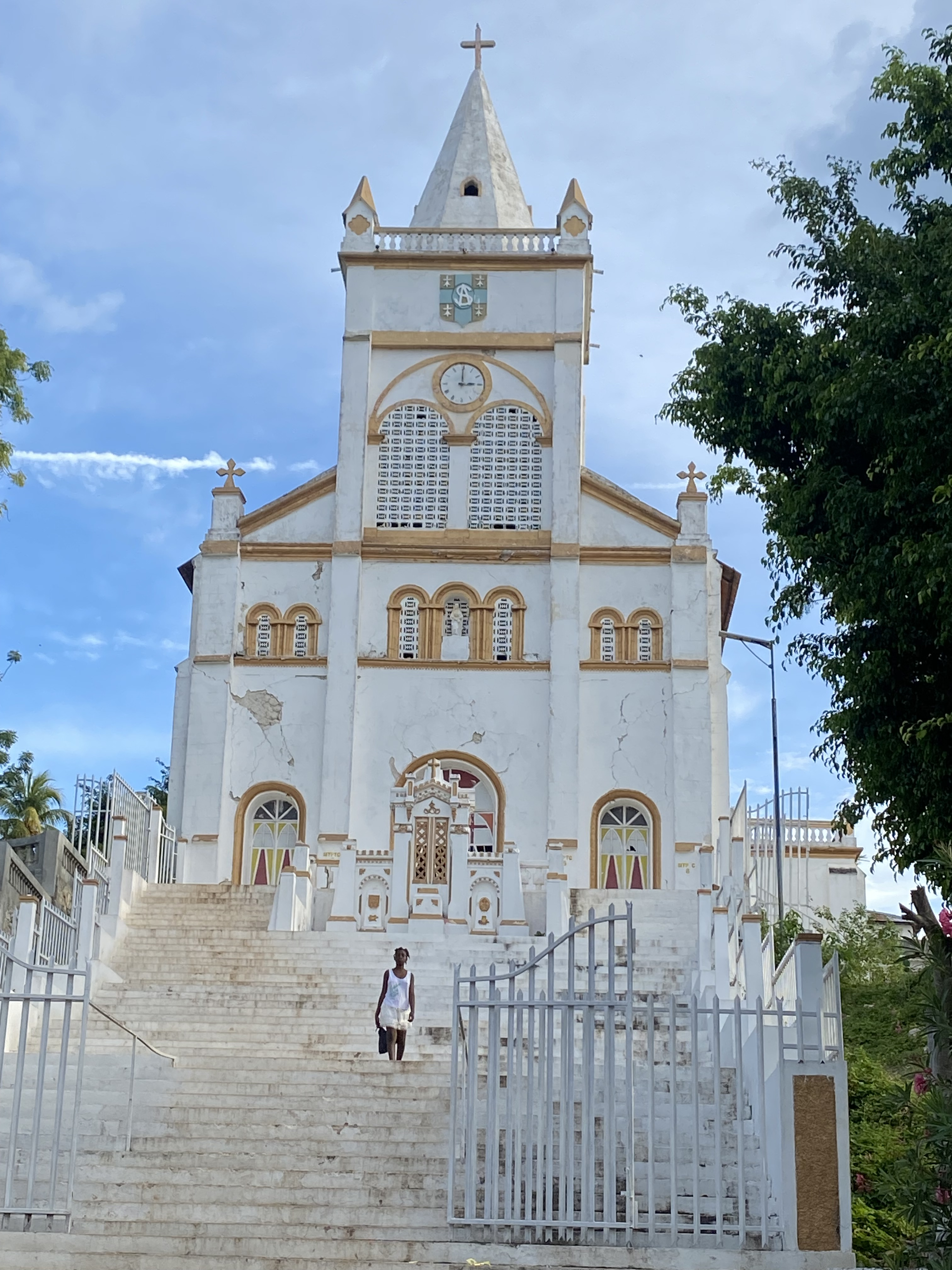
- Interactive map of Anse-à-Veau
- Location in Haiti
- Coordinates: 18°30′9″N 73°20′38″W
- Country: Haiti
- Department: Nippes
- Arrondissement: Anse-à-Veau

Area
  - Total: 103.23 km^{2} (39.86 sq mi)
- Elevation: 0 m (0 ft)

Population (2015)
  - Total: 34,613
  - Density: 335/km^{2} (870/sq mi)
- Time zone: UTC−05:00 (EST)
  - Summer (DST): UTC−04:00 (EDT)
- Postal code: HT 7510

Anse-à-Veau (French pronunciation: [ɑ̃s a vo]; Haitian Creole: Ansavo) is a commune in the Anse-à-Veau Arrondissement, in the Nippes department of Haiti. The postal code is HT 7510.

In the aftermath of the 2010 Haiti earthquake, Anse-a-Veau was swollen by refugees from the afflicted areas. Aid to the community after the quake have been airdropped. As of 12 March 2010, 6 weeks after the quake, RFA Largs Bay arrived off the coast and made a large aid drop.
