= Hope for Haiti =

American non-profit organization

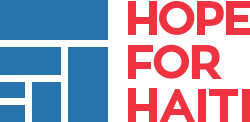
- Founded: 1989
- Founder: JoAnne Kuehner
- Type: NGO
- Purpose: Connect, Heal, Empower
- Location: 1021 5th Avenue North, Naples, Florida 34102
- Region served: Haiti
- CEO: Skyler Badenoch
- Website: hopeforhaiti.com

Hope for Haiti is a non-profit organization based in Naples, Florida, USA, founded in 1989 by JoAnne Kuehner. The mission of the organization is to improve the quality of life for the Haitian people, particularly children, through education, healthcare, water, infrastructure and economy. In addition, Hope for Haiti has an emergency relief component and has responded to several natural disasters like the 2010 Haiti earthquake and Hurricane Matthew since its founding.

== Programs ==
=== Education ===
Hope for Haiti considers education to be the keystone to sustainable development. By supporting, strengthening, and expanding the resources of existing schools, Hope for Haiti provides children with the tools they need to create their own future.

=== Health care ===
Hope for Haiti works to improve the overall health of its partner communities with the patient at the center of this process. Hope for Haiti distributes medications and supplies to rural partner facilities throughout the South and provides school-based public health outreach to students and their communities. To provide greater quality service and educational resources to local communities, Hope for Haiti also supplies Haitian medical professionals with advanced medical training from international specialists. Treatment & follow-up care are administered at Hope for Haiti's Infirmary, where patients receive low-cost, quality primary care for dental, surgical, wounds, and laboratory testing.

=== Water ===
Through Hope for Haiti's Clean Water Program, the organization installs and maintains solar-powered ultraviolet water purification systems and wells in community-accessible locations. Each clean water site is closely monitored and tested monthly by Hope for Haiti's Haitian water technician. In conjunction with Hope for Haiti's school-based Public Health Program, trained Community Health Workers educate over 2,400 students and their families on the importance of clean water, sanitation and hygiene. This approach ensures the development of healthy habits at the youngest age.

=== Economy ===
Hope for Haiti's partnerships with Yunus Social Business S.A. (YSB Haiti) and the Dalio Foundation promote economic sustainability and promote and develop social businesses in rural communities. The goal is to create long-lasting sustainability for school operations.

=== Infrastructure ===
In many Haitian communities, there are huge demands for school and community infrastructure improvement projects. Hope for Haiti has helped address many of these issues in several of their partner communities. Along with the support of local and international partners and donors, Hope for Haiti helped engage construction experts to provide children and their families with efficient, safe and beautiful spaces to live.

== 2010 Haiti earthquake ==
Within 24 hours of the January 12, 2010, earthquake in Haiti, Hope for Haiti responded with emergency relief buckets and the distribution of medical supplies. The organization has since airlifted thousands of pounds of medicines, supplies, construction materials, food and water and safely distributed them to the survivors. Hope for Haiti field staff were involved in organizing a trauma center at the hotel Villa Creole and at "L'Hôpital Général" in Port-au-Prince.

Hope for Haiti sent over $11 million in supplies to Haiti in the first four weeks following the quake. The delivery of medicines and equipment is a part of the organization's on-going mission. Support has come from the Southwest Florida and international communities both monetarily and through hundreds of volunteer hours.

Since the earthquake, Hope for Haiti was featured as one of Charity Navigator's 10 Best Humanitarian Organizations.
