= 1751 Port-au-Prince earthquake =

Magnitude 7-8 earthquake that occurred in Port-au-Prince, Haiti in 1751

- Location within Haiti
- Local date: November 21, 1751
- Magnitude: 7.0 to 8.0 M_{s}
- Epicenter: 18°30′N 72°18′W
- Areas affected: Saint-Domingue
- Casualties: unknown

The 1751 Port-au-Prince earthquake occurred at 12:50 UTC on 21 November in Saint-Domingue, followed by a tsunami. Another earthquake was reported at the same location on 15 September of the same year and it is uncertain whether the two reports refer to the same event.

== Seismological analysis ==
Later seismologists attributed the 1751 earthquake, like that of 1910, to adjustments along the Southern Trough.
