= Nippes =

Department of Haiti

Coordinates: 18°27′N 73°6′W

Nippes Nip
- Department
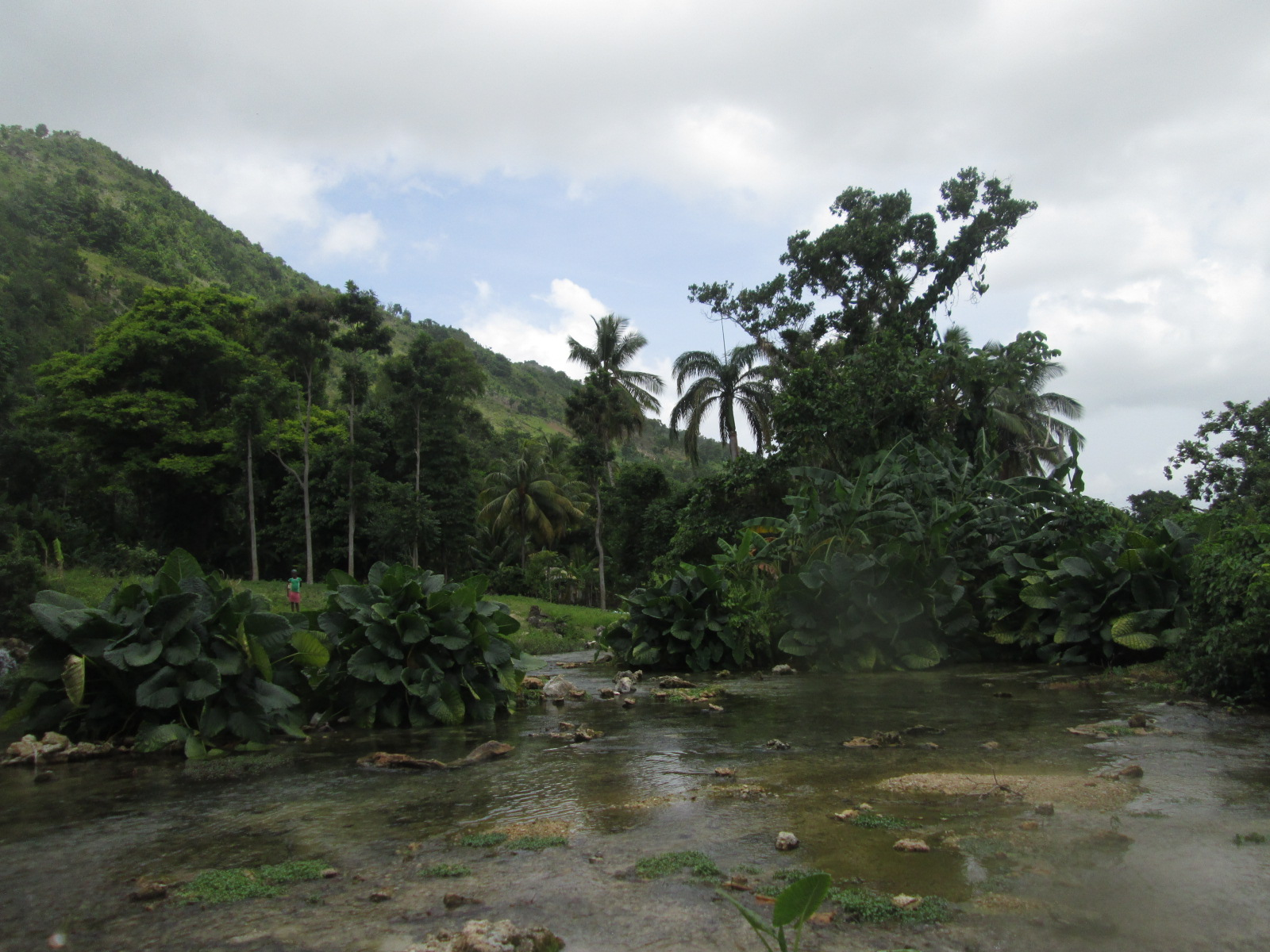
- Saut du Baril

- Nippes in Haiti
- Country: Haiti
- Capital: Miragoâne
- Region: Tiburon Peninsula
- Symbols: Snowy egret and Yellow-crowned night heron

Government
  - Type: Departmental Council

Area
  - Department: 1,267.77 km^{2} (489.49 sq mi)

Population (2015)
  - Department: 342,325
  - Density: 270.021/km^{2} (699.352/sq mi)
  - Urban: 62,211
  - Rural: 280,314
- Time zone: UTC-05:00 (EST)
  - Summer (DST): UTC-04:00 (EDT)
- ISO 3166 code: HT-NI
- HDI (2017): 0.482 low · 5th

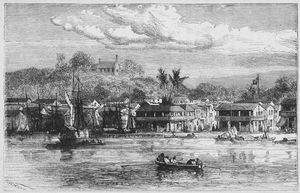
Miragoâne en 1881

Nippes (French, pronounced [nip]) or Nip (Haitian Creole) is one of the ten departments (the highest-level political subdivisions) of Haiti located in southern Haiti. It is the most recently created department, having been split from Grand'Anse in 2003. The capital of the department is Miragoâne, and it is the least populous department in Haiti.

== History ==
=== Haitian Period ===
Being created from Grand'Anse most of Nippes' history is similar to Grand'Anse's.

Nippes during the Haitian Revolution played a big role with marron troops led by notably Plymouth a Jamaican later on was in Haiti.

=== Independence ===
Étienne Gérin from Miragwàn is a signatory of the Haitian Declaration of Independence. During the Haitian Civil war between Pétion and Henry 1st, André Rigaud came back to Haiti from France and was disappointed by Pétion's laissez-faire politics and created a de facto republic, the Meridional Republic of Haiti and the Miragoanes bridge was the limit between those two republics.

== Geography ==
The department is bordered to the north by the Gulf of Gonave, to the west the Grand'Anse Department, south by the South Department and to the east by the Ouest Department.

The Nippes River is the most important of the department and one of the most important in the country.

Nippes has one of the biggest and most well-preserved bays in Haiti. The Baradères Bay is formed by the Baradères Peninsula and protects multiple minor islands and cays like Picoulet and Corny Island.

Part of the Miragoanes Lake is shared between Nippes and West Departement is the biggest natural freshwater lake in Haiti.

Nippes has many minor islands with one of the biggest cay being the Rochelois located 15 km offshore. The cay has a potential for land reclamation in Haiti.

== Economy ==
Nippes has great mining potential in bauxite since the town of Miragoanes had a major bauxite plant operated by Reynold's company.

Nippes has an agriculture and fishing industry with the lake having a potential for pisciculture.

Nippes is a commerce hub since the Miragoanes Port is one of the biggest ports in the South.

== Transportation ==
The RN2 (national road system) passes through Nippes going to Les Cayes and making it the bridge between 2 departments. Another one is proposed to connect it to Grand'Anse.

Miragoanes is the major port in the town and the department has no airport.

== Administrative divisions ==
The department of Nippes is subdivided into three arrondissements (districts), which are further subdivided into eleven communes (the equivalent of a city or municipality).

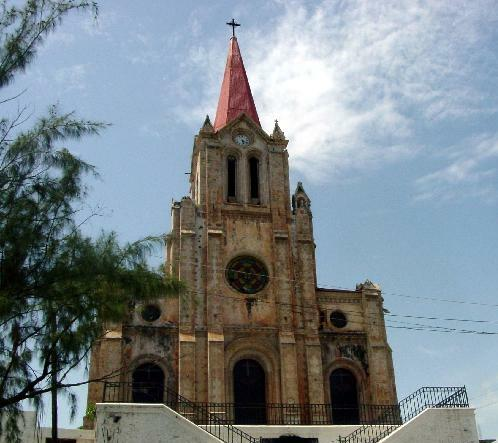
Miragoâne Cathedral

- Anse-à-Veau Arrondissement
  - Anse-à-Veau
  - Arnaud
  - L'Asile
  - Petit-Trou-de-Nippes
  - Plaisance-du-Sud
- Baradères Arrondissement
  - Baradères
  - Grand-Boucan
- Miragoâne Arrondissement
  - Miragoâne
  - Fonds-des-Nègres
  - Paillant
  - Petite-Rivière-de-Nippes
