= Carrefour (disambiguation) =

Carrefour is a hypermarket brand of the Carrefour Group.

Carrefour may also refer to:

== Places ==
- Carrefour, a French word meaning road intersection
- Carrefour, Haiti, a commune of Port-au-Prince, Haiti
- Carrefour de l'Arbre, a 2.1 km cobbled road in the Nord department of Northern France
- Carrefour-de-l'Hôpital District, a municipal electoral division
- Carrefour Sanon, rural settlement in Haiti

=== Schools ===
- École Carrefour de l'Acadie, a Francophone middle school located in Dieppe, New Brunswick, Canada
- École du Carrefour, Dartmouth, NS, Canada; a Canadian French-language public high school
- Polyvalente Le Carrefour, Gatineau, QC, Canada; a polytecnic highschool

=== Shopping malls ===
- Carrefour Angrignon, a mall located in Angrignon, Ville Emard, Montreal, QC, Canada
- Carrefour de l'Estrie, a mall located in Sherbrooke, Estrie, QC, Canada
- Carrefour Laval, a super regional mall located in Laval, QC, Canada
- Carrefour Langelier, a mall located in Langelier, Longue-Pointe, Mercier-Ouest, Mercier, Montreal, QC, Canada
- Carrefour du Nord, a mall located in Saint-Jerome, QC, Canada
- Carrefour Saint-Georges, a mall located in Saint-Georges, QC, Canada
- CarrefourSA Maltepe Park, a modern shopping mall in Istanbul, Turkey

=== Transit stations ===
- Carrefour Pleyel station, a Paris Metro station in Saint-Denis, France
- Terminus Le Carrefour, Laval, QC, Canada; a bus station on Le Carrefour street, next to Carrefour Laval mall

=== Villages ===
- Carrefour Gros Chaudiere, a village in the Tiburon commune of the Chardonnières Arrondissement, in the Sud department of Haiti.
- Carrefour Malatle, a village in the Dame-Marie commune of the Anse d'Hainault Arrondissement, in the Grand'Anse department of Haiti.
- Carrefour Mambo, a village in Haiti
- Sokrogbo-Carrefour, a village in southern Ivory Coast

== Groups, organizations ==
- AS Carrefour, an association football club from Carrefour, Haiti
- Carrefour City, a French convenience store chain operated by Groupe Carrefour
- Carrefour Express, a supermarket chain owned by the Carrefour Group operating in several countries
- Carrefour Group, a French multinational retail and wholesaling corporation.
- Carrefour Market, a French supermarket chain operated by Groupe Carrefour
- Carrefour Planet, a hypermarket chain owned by Carrefour
- CarrefourSA, a Turkish supermarket chain

== Other uses ==
- Mait' Carrefour, in vodou, a loa in charge of crossroads
- Carrefour (film), a 1938 French drama film
- Carrefour de Lodéon, a French daily classical music radio program
