= Pointe Sable =

- Village
- Location in Haiti
- Coordinates: 18°36′20″N 73°47′45″W
- Country: Haiti
- Department: Grand'Anse
- Arrondissement: Corail
- Elevation: 4 m (13 ft)
- Time zone: UTC-05:00 (EST)
  - Summer (DST): UTC-04:00 (EDT)

Pointe Sable is a village on the Grande Cayemite island in the Pestel commune of the Corail Arrondissement, in the Grand'Anse department of Haiti.
