= Jean Beurry =

- Village
- Location in Haiti
- Coordinates: 18°28′44″N 73°47′12″W
- Country: Haiti
- Department: Grand'Anse
- Arrondissement: Corail
- Elevation: 578 m (1,896 ft)

Jean Beurry is a rural village in the Pestel commune of the Corail Arrondissement, in the Grand'Anse department of Haiti.
