= Mare Citron =

- Village
- Location in Haiti
- Coordinates: 18°36′55″N 73°45′22″W
- Country: Haiti
- Department: Grand'Anse
- Arrondissement: Corail
- Elevation: 203 m (666 ft)

Mare Citron is a rural village on the Grande Cayemite island in the Pestel commune of the Corail Arrondissement, in the Grand'Anse department of Haiti.
