= Au Bord de l'Etang =

Au Bord de l'Étang
- Village
- Location in Haiti
- Coordinates: 18°35′06″N 73°44′32″W
- Country: Haiti
- Department: Grand'Anse
- Arrondissement: Corail
- Elevation: 6 m (20 ft)

Au Bord de l'Étang is a village on the Grande Cayemite island in the Pestel commune of the Corail Arrondissement, in the Grand'Anse department of Haiti.
