= Dame-Marie =

Dame-Marie may refer to several communes in France:

- Dame-Marie, Eure, in the Eure département
- Dame-Marie, Orne, in the Orne département
- Dame-Marie-les-Bois, in the Indre-et-Loire département

It is also the name of a commune and town in Haiti:

- Dame-Marie, a commune in the Grand'Anse department
- Dame Marie City, the main city of Dame-Marie commune

== See also ==
- Dammarie (disambiguation)
