= Anse du Nord =

- Village
- Location in Haiti
- Coordinates: 18°37′55″N 73°46′56″W
- Country: Haiti
- Department: Grand'Anse
- Arrondissement: Corail
- Elevation: 3 m (9.8 ft)

Anse du Nord is a village on the Grande Cayemite island in the Pestel commune of the Corail Arrondissement, in the Grand'Anse department of Haiti.
