= Anse a Macon =

- Village
- Location in Haiti
- Coordinates: 18°35′22″N 73°43′29″W
- Country: Haiti
- Department: Grand'Anse
- Arrondissement: Corail
- Elevation: 5 m (16 ft)

Anse a Macon is a rural village on the Grande Cayemite island in the Pestel commune of the Corail Arrondissement, in the Grand'Anse department of Haiti.
