= Nan Palmiste =

- Village
- Location in Haiti
- Coordinates: 18°31′50″N 73°50′57″W
- Country: Haiti
- Department: Grand'Anse
- Arrondissement: Corail
- Elevation: 305 m (1,001 ft)

Nan Palmiste is a rural village in the Pestel commune of the Corail Arrondissement, in the Grand'Anse department of Haiti.
