= Gros Basin =

- Village
- Location in Haiti
- Coordinates: 18°33′29″N 73°52′30″W
- Country: Haiti
- Department: Grand'Anse
- Arrondissement: Corail
- Elevation: 240 m (790 ft)

Gros Basin (French pronunciation: [ɡʁo bazɛ̃]) is a rural village in the Corail commune of the Corail Arrondissement, in the Grand'Anse department of Haiti.

The village is surrounded by hilly terrain and is locally known for fishing.

== See also ==
- Haitian cuisine
