= Joly Guirbert =

- Village
- Location in Haiti
- Coordinates: 18°29′34″N 73°46′55″W
- Country: Haiti
- Department: Grand'Anse
- Arrondissement: Corail
- Elevation: 367 m (1,204 ft)

Joly Guirbert is a rural village in the Pestel commune of the Corail Arrondissement, in the Grand'Anse department of Haiti.
