= Bourjoly =

- Village
- Location in Haiti
- Coordinates: 18°29′57″N 73°46′25″W
- Country: Haiti
- Department: Grand'Anse
- Arrondissement: Corail
- Elevation: 413 m (1,355 ft)

Bourjoly is a village in the Pestel commune of the Corail Arrondissement, in the Grand'Anse department of Haiti.
