= Troupeau, Haiti =

Troupeau
- Village
- Location in Haiti
- Coordinates: 18°32′00″N 73°56′01″W
- Country: Haiti
- Department: Grand'Anse
- Arrondissement: Corail
- Elevation: 86 m (282 ft)

Troupeau (French pronunciation: [tʁupo]) is a rural village in the Corail commune of the Corail Arrondissement, in the Grand'Anse department of Haiti.
