= Escamel =

- Village
- Location in Haiti
- Coordinates: 18°27′39″N 74°24′52″W
- Country: Haiti
- Department: Grand'Anse
- Arrondissement: Anse d'Hainault
- Elevation: 320 m (1,050 ft)

Escamel is a rural village in the Anse d'Hainault commune, in the Anse d'Hainault Arrondissement, in the Grand'Anse department of Haiti.
