= Flandre, Haiti =

Flandre
- Village
- Location in Haiti
- Coordinates: 18°29′36″N 73°58′35″W
- Country: Haiti
- Department: Grand'Anse
- Arrondissement: Corail
- Elevation: 578 m (1,896 ft)

Flandre (French pronunciation: [flɑ̃dʁ]) is a rural village in the Beaumont commune of the Corail Arrondissement, in the Grand'Anse department of Haiti.
