= Grand Vincent =

- Communal section
- Location in Haiti
- Coordinates: 18°33′38″N 74°4′12″W
- Country: Haiti
- Department: Grand'Anse
- Arrondissement: Corail
- Elevation: 326 m (1,070 ft)

Grand Vincent (French pronunciation: [ɡʁɑ̃ vɛ̃sɑ̃]) is a communal section in the Roseaux commune of the Corail Arrondissement, in the Grand'Anse department of Haiti.
