= Layon Fon =

- Village
- Location in Haiti
- Coordinates: 18°24′57″N 74°01′40″W
- Country: Haiti
- Department: Grand'Anse
- Arrondissement: Corail
- Elevation: 679 m (2,228 ft)

Layon Fon is a rural village in the Corail commune of the Corail Arrondissement, in the Grand'Anse department of Haiti.
