= Miyu, Haiti =

Miyu
- Village
- Location in Haiti
- Coordinates: 18°27′36″N 74°01′34″W
- Country: Haiti
- Department: Grand'Anse
- Arrondissement: Corail
- Elevation: 935 m (3,068 ft)

Miyu is a rural mountain village in the Corail commune of the Corail Arrondissement, in the Grand'Anse department of Haiti.
