= Mome, Haiti =

Mome
- Village
- Location in Haiti
- Coordinates: 18°34′54″N 74°22′40″W
- Country: Haiti
- Department: Grand'Anse
- Arrondissement: Anse d'Hainault
- Elevation: 157 m (515 ft)

Mome is a village in the Dame-Marie commune of the Anse d'Hainault Arrondissement, in the Grand'Anse department of Haiti.
