= Fond Gondai =

- Village
- Location in Haiti
- Coordinates: 18°28′15″N 73°47′01″W
- Country: Haiti
- Department: Grand'Anse
- Arrondissement: Corail
- Elevation: 429 m (1,407 ft)

Fond Gondai is a rural village in the Pestel commune of the Corail Arrondissement, in the Grand'Anse department of Haiti.
