= Lere de L'Eau =

Lere de L'eau
- Village
- Location in Haiti
- Coordinates: 18°28′04″N 73°46′10″W
- Country: Haiti
- Department: Grand'Anse
- Arrondissement: Corail
- Elevation: 374 m (1,227 ft)

Lere de L'eau is a rural village in the Pestel commune of the Corail Arrondissement, in the Grand'Anse department of Haiti.
