= Fond d'Acaque =

Village in Haiti

- Village
- Location in Haiti
- Coordinates: 18°32′11″N 73°58′40″W
- Country: Haiti
- Department: Grand'Anse
- Arrondissement: Corail
- Elevation: 185 m (607 ft)

Fond d'Acaque is a village in the Roseaux commune of the Corail Arrondissement, in the Grand'Anse department of Haiti.
