= Nan Dane =

- Village
- Location in Haiti
- Coordinates: 18°30′56″N 73°47′7″W
- Country: Haiti
- Department: Grand'Anse
- Arrondissement: Corail
- Elevation: 272 m (892 ft)

Nan Dane is a rural village in the Pestel commune of the Corail Arrondissement, in the Grand'Anse department of Haiti.
