= Beaumont City =

Beaumont City Ville de Beaumont Vil Bomon
- Town
- Location in Haiti
- Coordinates: 18°28′42″N 73°57′21″W
- Country: Haiti
- Department: Grand'Anse
- Arrondissement: Corail
- Elevation: 656 m (2,152 ft)

Beaumont (/boʊˈmɒnt/ boh-MONT), City of Beaumont or Beaumont City (French: Ville de Beaumont; Haitian Creole: Vil Bomon) is the principal town of the Beaumont commune in the Corail Arrondissement, in the Grand'Anse department of Haiti.
