= Mandor Doca =

- Village
- Location in Haiti
- Coordinates: 18°33′53″N 74°23′29″W
- Country: Haiti
- Department: Grand'Anse
- Arrondissement: Anse d'Hainault
- Elevation: 259 m (850 ft)

Mandor Doca is a rural village in the Dame-Marie commune of the Anse d'Hainault Arrondissement, in the Grand'Anse department of Haiti.
