= Peligrin =

- Village
- Location in Haiti
- Coordinates: 18°29′26″N 74°23′32″W
- Country: Haiti
- Department: Grand'Anse
- Arrondissement: Anse d'Hainault
- Elevation: 160 m (520 ft)

Peligrin is a village in the Anse d'Hainault commune, in the Anse d'Hainault Arrondissement, in the Grand'Anse department of Haiti.
