= Boise Sec =

- Village
- Location in Haiti
- Coordinates: 18°27′26″N 74°3′15″W
- Country: Haiti
- Department: Grand'Anse
- Arrondissement: Corail
- Elevation: 723 m (2,372 ft)

Boise Sec is a village in the Roseaux commune in the Corail Arrondissement, in the Grand'Anse department of Haiti.
