= Roseaux City =

Roseaux City Ville de Roseaux Vil Wozo
- Town
- Location in Haiti
- Coordinates: 18°36′01″N 74°01′9″W
- Country: Haiti
- Department: Grand'Anse
- Arrondissement: Corail
- Elevation: 13 m (43 ft)

Roseaux (/roʊˈzoʊ/); also City of Roseaux, Roseaux City (French: Ville de Roseaux; Haitian Creole: Vil Wozo) is the principal town of the Roseaux commune of the Corail Arrondissement, in the Grand'Anse department of Haiti.

It is listed as a location in the book The Geographical and Historical Dictionary of America and the West.
