= Balandier =

- Village
- Location in Haiti
- Coordinates: 18°35′41″N 74°24′59″W
- Country: Haiti
- Department: Grand'Anse
- Arrondissement: Anse d'Hainault
- Elevation: 3 m (9.8 ft)

Balandier is a village in the Dame-Marie municipality of the Anse d'Hainault Arrondissement, in the Grand'Anse department of Haiti.
