= La Basulle =

- Village
- Location in Haiti
- Coordinates: 18°32′06″N 73°59′40″W
- Country: Haiti
- Department: Grand'Anse
- Arrondissement: Corail
- Elevation: 208 m (682 ft)

La Basulle is a village in the Roseaux commune of the Corail Arrondissement, in the Grand'Anse department of Haiti.
