= Fond Cochon =

- Town
- Location in Haiti
- Coordinates: 18°27′50″N 74°04′12″W
- Country: Haiti
- Department: Grand'Anse
- Arrondissement: Corail
- Elevation: 130 m (430 ft)
- Time zone: UTC-05:00 (EST)
  - Summer (DST): UTC-04:00 (EDT)

Fond Cochon, is a town in Haiti in the Roseaux commune in the Corail Arrondissement, in the Grand'Anse department.
