= Durocher =

Durocher is a surname. Notable people with the surname include:

- Brian Durocher, American ice hockey player and coach
- Eulalie Durocher (1811–1849), Canadian nun and candidate for sainthood
- Jean-Baptiste Durocher (1754–1811), Canadian businessman and politician
- Joseph Marie Elisabeth Durocher (1817–1860), French geologist
- Leo Durocher (1905–1991), American baseball player and manager
- Marie Durocher (1809–1893), Brazilian doctor
- Nicholas Durocher, known professionally as Talk, Canadian musician
- Olivier Durocher (Ontario politician) (1844–1931), Canadian politician from Ontario
- Olivier Durocher (Quebec politician) (1743–1821), Canadian politician from Quebec

== See also ==
- Durocher, Haiti is a village in the Dame-Marie commune of Haiti
