= La Salle, Haiti =

La Salle
- Village
- Location in Haiti
- Coordinates: 18°31′51″N 73°45′26″W
- Country: Haiti
- Department: Grand'Anse
- Arrondissement: Corail
- Elevation: 92 m (302 ft)

La Salle is a rural village in the Pestel commune of the Corail Arrondissement, in the Grand'Anse department of Haiti.
