= D'lagon =

- Village
- Location in Haiti
- Coordinates: 18°28′25″N 74°0′24″W
- Country: Haiti
- Department: Grand'Anse
- Arrondissement: Corail
- Elevation: 724 m (2,375 ft)

D'lagon is a mountain village in the Corail commune of the Corail Arrondissement, in the Grand'Anse department of Haiti.
