= Plane Martin =

- Village
- Location in Haiti
- Coordinates: 18°28′09″N 73°48′36″W
- Country: Haiti
- Department: Grand'Anse
- Arrondissement: Corail
- Elevation: 489 m (1,604 ft)

Population (2021)
  - Total: 7,614

Plane Martin is a rural village in the Pestel commune of the Corail Arrondissement, in the Grand'Anse department of Haiti. As of 2021, it had a population of 7,614. It is located along Route 7.
