= Annete =

- Village
- Location in Haiti
- Coordinates: 18°25′55″N 74°03′31″W
- Country: Haiti
- Department: Grand'Anse
- Arrondissement: Corail
- Elevation: 911 m (2,989 ft)

Annete is a village in the Roseaux commune of the Corail Arrondissement, in the Grand'Anse department of Haiti.
