= Dossous =

- Village
- Location in Haiti
- Coordinates: 18°25′39″N 74°27′57″W
- Country: Haiti
- Department: Grand'Anse
- Arrondissement: Anse d'Hainault
- Elevation: 160 m (520 ft)

Dossous is a village in the Anse d'Hainault commune, in the Anse d'Hainault Arrondissement, in the Grand'Anse department of Haiti.
