= Nan Miel =

- Village
- Location in Haiti
- Coordinates: 18°24′30″N 74°00′37″W
- Country: Haiti
- Department: Grand'Anse
- Arrondissement: Corail
- Elevation: 765 m (2,510 ft)

Nan Miel is a rural village in the Corail commune of the Corail Arrondissement, in the Grand'Anse department of Haiti.
