= Plaine Griffie =

- Village
- Location in Haiti
- Coordinates: 18°30′43″N 74°24′39″W
- Country: Haiti
- Department: Grand'Anse
- Arrondissement: Anse d'Hainault
- Elevation: 107 m (351 ft)

Plaine Griffie is a village in the Dame-Marie commune of the Anse d'Hainault Arrondissement, in the Grand'Anse department of Haiti.
