= Duvineau =

- Village
- Location in Haiti
- Coordinates: 18°30′59″N 74°26′30″W
- Country: Haiti
- Department: Grand'Anse
- Arrondissement: Anse d'Hainault
- Elevation: 8 m (26 ft)

Duvineau is a coastal village in the Dame-Marie commune of the Anse d'Hainault Arrondissement, in the Grand'Anse department of Haiti.
