= Nan Plingue =

Nan Plinque
- Village
- Location in Haiti
- Coordinates: 18°35′32″N 73°59′17″W
- Country: Haiti
- Department: Grand'Anse
- Arrondissement: Corail
- Elevation: 169 m (554 ft)

Nan Plingue is a village in the Roseaux commune of the Corail Arrondissement, in the Grand'Anse department of Haiti.
