= Decotelette =

- Village
- Location in Haiti
- Coordinates: 18°26′26″N 74°20′14″W
- Country: Haiti
- Department: Grand'Anse
- Arrondissement: Anse d'Hainault
- Elevation: 393 m (1,289 ft)

Decotelette is a rural village in the Anse d'Hainault commune, in the Anse d'Hainault Arrondissement, in the Grand'Anse department of Haiti.
