= Fond Roge =

- Village
- Location in Haiti
- Coordinates: 18°31′37″N 73°58′22″W
- Country: Haiti
- Department: Grand'Anse
- Arrondissement: Corail
- Elevation: 179 m (587 ft)

Fond Roge is a rural village in the Corail commune of the Corail Arrondissement, in the Grand'Anse department of Haiti.
