= Henriette Saint-Marc =

Spy and martyr of the Haitian revolution (c. 1750–1802)

Henriette Saint-Marc (c. 1750–1802) was a spy and martyr of the Haitian revolution.

== Biography ==
=== Early life ===
Henriette Saint-Marc was born to a black slave mother and a white father, a civil servant from Saint-Domingue. She would have had the status of “libre de couleur”, a category that included non-white people born free or freed.

=== Prostitution ===
In the early 1800s, Henriette Saint-Marc lived in Port-au-Prince. She was renowned for her beauty and works as a prostitute. She is said to have seduced many French soldiers. Later accounts, perhaps apocryphal, tell of her extracting information from them and passing it on to Toussaint, luring some of them into ambushes and stealing weapons and ammunition.

=== Capture and execution ===
In 1802, Henriette Saint-Marc was accused of supplying weapons to Haitian fighters in the town of Arcahaie, shortly after Toussaint Louverture's deportation. She was arrested and sentenced to death. She was hanged in the marketplace.

== Legacy ==
In 1988, writer Jacques Rey-Charlier dedicated a play to her, “La Passion d'Henriette Saint Marc”.

An establishment in the town of Corail bears her name.
