= Planche, Haiti =

Planche
- Village
- Location in Haiti
- Coordinates: 18°36′55″N 74°24′24″W
- Country: Haiti
- Department: Grand'Anse
- Arrondissement: Anse d'Hainault
- Elevation: 72 m (236 ft)

Planche is a rural village in the Dame-Marie commune of the Anse d'Hainault Arrondissement, in the Grand'Anse department of Haiti.
