= Dame Marie City =

Dame Marie City Ville de Dame-Marie Vil Dam Mari
- Town
- Location in Haiti
- Coordinates: 18°33′39″N 74°25′15″W
- Country: Haiti
- Department: Grand'Anse
- Arrondissement: Anse d'Hainault
- Elevation: 16 m (52 ft)

Dame Marie (/ˌdeɪm məˈriː/); also City of Dame Marie, Dame Marie City (French: Ville de Dame-Marie; Haitian Creole: Vil Dam Mari) is the principal town of the Dame-Marie commune of the Anse d'Hainault Arrondissement, in the Grand'Anse department of Haiti.
