= Carcasse, Haiti =

Carcasse
- Village
- Location in Haiti
- Coordinates: 18°27′0″N 74°3′0″W
- Country: Haiti
- Department: Grand'Anse
- Arrondissement: Anse d'Hainault

Carcasse is a village in the Anse d'Hainault, in the Grand'Anse department of Haiti.
