= Planche =

Planche may refer to:

- Planche (exercise), a bodyweight exercise
- James Planché (1796–1880), British dramatist, antiquary and officer of arms
- Jean Baptiste Gustave Planche (1808–1857), French art and literary critic
- La Planche, a village in France
- Planche, Haiti, a rural village in the Dame-Marie commune of Haiti

== See also ==
- Planchet, a round metal disk to be struck as a coin
