= Gomier =

- Village
- Location in Haiti
- Coordinates: 18°36′22″N 74°03′11″W
- Country: Haiti
- Department: Grand'Anse
- Arrondissement: Corail
- Elevation: 6 m (20 ft)
- Time zone: UTC-05:00 (EST)
  - Summer (DST): UTC-04:00 (EDT)

Gomier is a village in the Roseaux municipality of the Corail Arrondissement, in the Grand'Anse department of Haiti. It is in the 4th communal section of Roseaux, part of the Jérémie Arrondissement in the Grand'Anse Department, Haiti. It is considered a suburban settlement and had an estimated population of 6,360 as of 2015. The village falls under the postal code HT7320. It is situated near the coast and is known for its beach, local agriculture, and recent development efforts related to water accessibility.
