= Durocher, Haiti =

Durocher
- Village
- Location in Haiti
- Coordinates: 18°35′44″N 74°24′05″W
- Country: Haiti
- Department: Grand'Anse
- Arrondissement: Anse d'Hainault
- Elevation: 51 m (167 ft)

Durocher is a village in the Dame-Marie commune of the Anse d'Hainault Arrondissement, in the Grand'Anse department of Haiti.
