= Pierre Mercier =

Pierre Mercier may refer to:

- Pierre Mercier (footballer) (born 1982), Haitian international footballer
- Pierre Mercier (politician) (1937–2020), Canadian politician
