= Anolis demissus =

Scientific classification
- Kingdom: Animalia
- Phylum: Chordata
- Class: Reptilia
- Order: Squamata
- Suborder: Iguania
- Family: Dactyloidae
- Genus: Anolis
- Species: A. demissus

Binomial name
- Anolis demissus Schwartz, 1969

Species of lizard

Anolis demissus, the Île Grande Cayemite green anole, is a species of lizard in the family Dactyloidae. The species is found on Île Grande Cayemite in Haiti.
