= Carcasse =

Carcasse is the French language word for carcass. It may refer to:

== Places ==
- Carcasse, Haiti

== Other ==
- Carcasse (film), a 2007 film
