= Les Irois =

Les Irois Lèziwa
- Commune
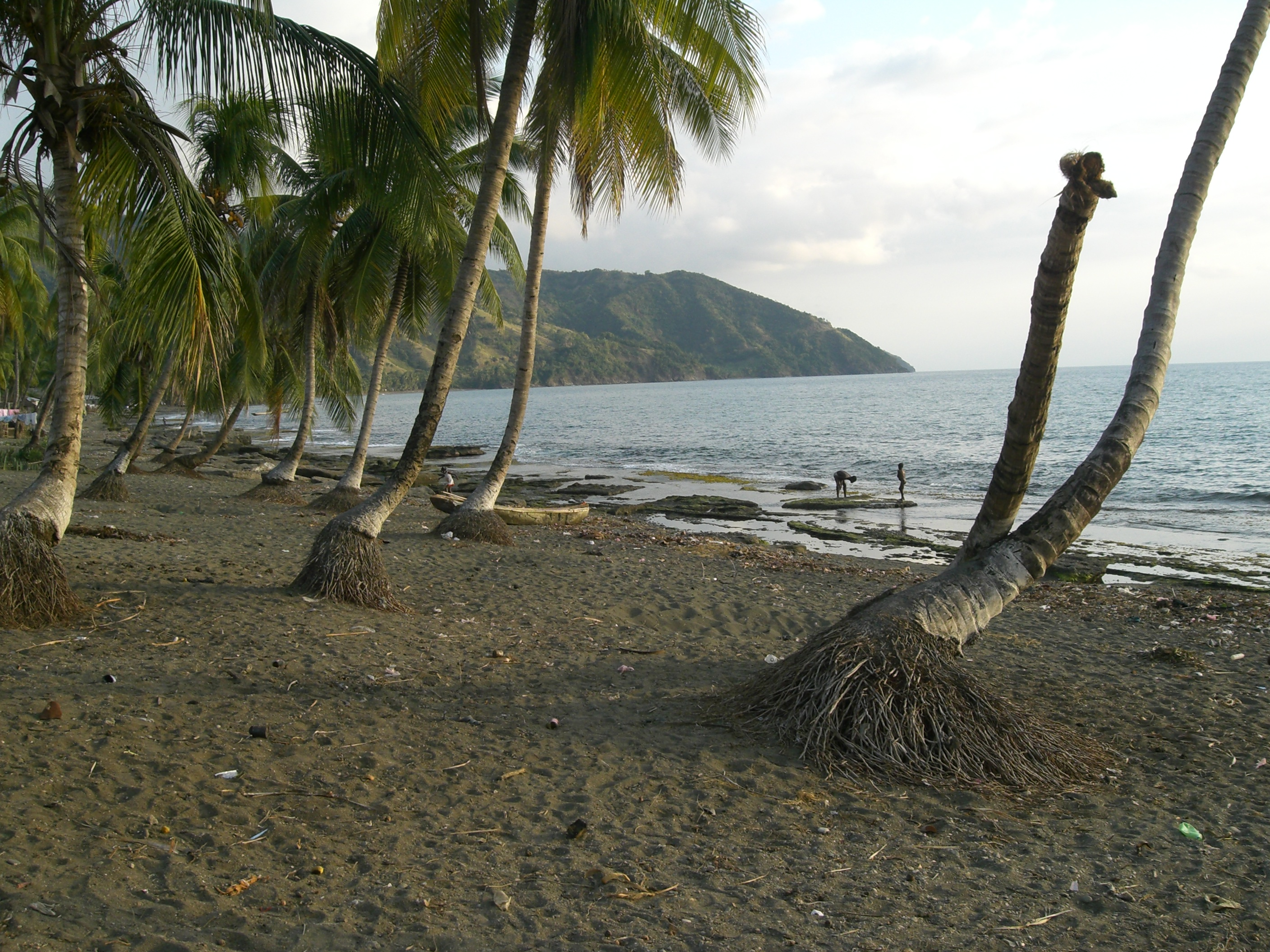
- Beach at Les Irois 2005
- Interactive map of Les Irois
- Location in Haiti
- Coordinates: 18°24′0″N 74°27′0″W
- Country: Haiti
- Department: Grand'Anse
- Arrondissement: Anse-d'Hainault

Area
  - Total: 130.33 km^{2} (50.32 sq mi)
- Elevation: 110 m (360 ft)

Population (2015)
  - Total: 23,374
  - Density: 179.34/km^{2} (464.50/sq mi)
- Time zone: UTC−05:00 (EST)
  - Summer (DST): UTC−04:00 (EDT)
- Postal code: HT 7230

Les Irois (French pronunciation: [lez‿iʁwa]; Haitian Creole: Lèziwa) is a commune in the Anse-d'Hainault Arrondissement, in the Grand'Anse department of Haiti.

== Population ==
It had 23,374 inhabitants in 2015, of which 55.59% (12,993) were adults of 18 years and older.

A majority of the population lives in areas classified as rural (15,923 or 65%). This proportion has decreased from 66% in 2012 signifying a mild but significant pace of urbanization. A significant proportion of the urban population lives in Ville de Irois.

Men predominate in the commune; there were 784 women for every 1000 men in 2015 down from 847 in 2012. The situation is worse in rural areas of the section communale of Matador (Jorgue) where there were 680 women for every 1000 men.

== Administrative Division ==
The commune is divided into three section communal: Matador (Jorgure), Belair and Carcasse.

== Localities ==
Matador, Ti l'étang, Jogue, Bananier, Potorier, Douter, Carcasse, Petite Cahoune, Fond Jogue, Nan Fort, Bazarin, Menadrier, Rabit, Casal, Mercier, Nan Colo, Belair, Bourdon, Papi, Mapou Tampé, Chalevette, Marie Gerome, Morne, Perrier, Morne Adine, Morne Mansinte, Morne Mare Rouge, Morne Bitoche, Morne Bois Débout and Morne Nan Poisson.
