= Anse-d'Hainault =

Anse-d'Hainault: Ansdeno
- Commune
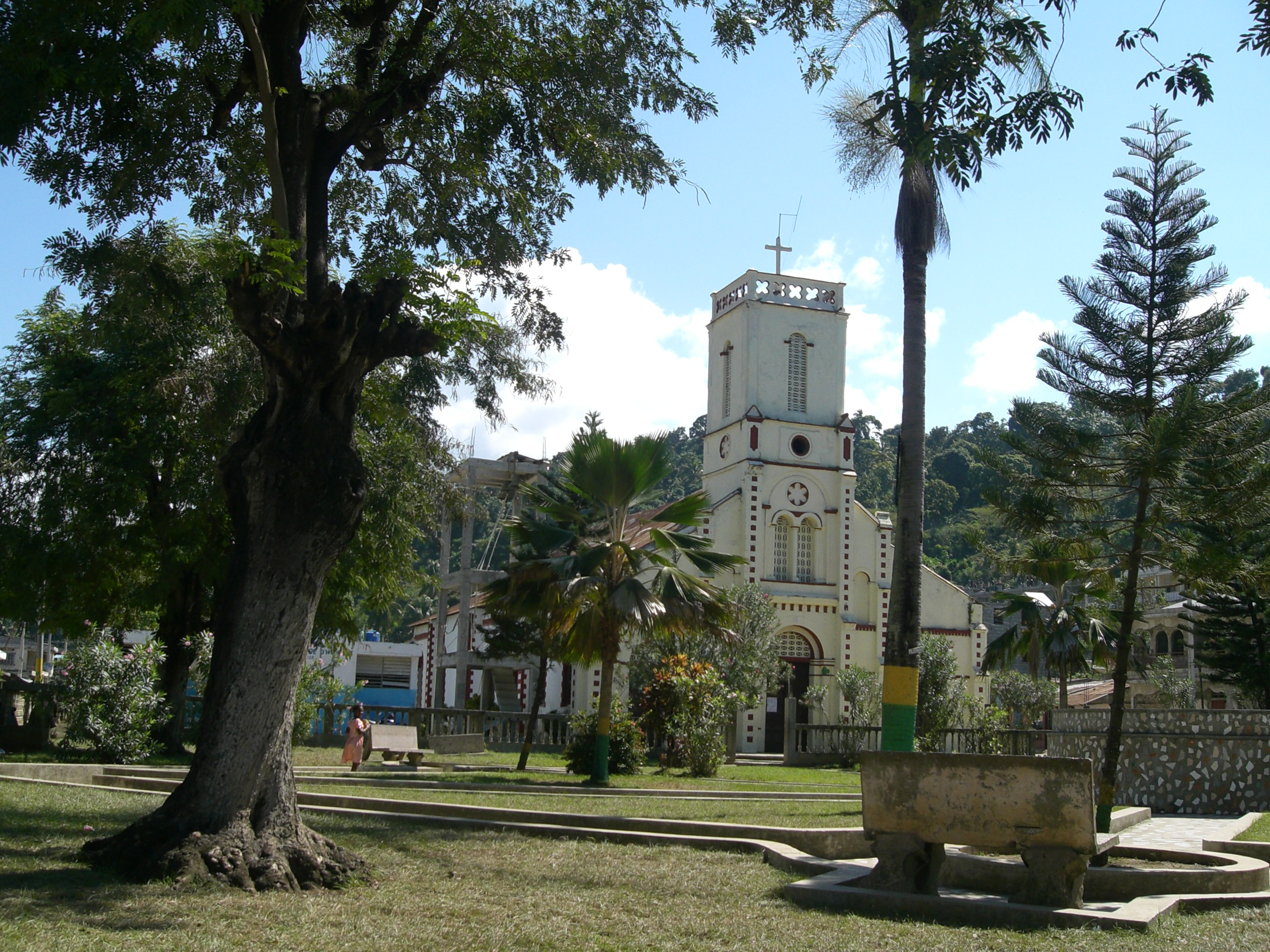
- Anse d'Hainault church
- Interactive map of Anse-d'Hainault
- Location in Haiti
- Coordinates: 18°30′0″N 74°27′0″W
- Country: Haiti
- Department: Grand'Anse
- Arrondissement: Anse-d'Hainault

Area
  - Total: 94.03 km^{2} (36.31 sq mi)
- Elevation: 148 m (486 ft)

Population (2015)
  - Total: 36,401
  - Density: 387/km^{2} (1,000/sq mi)
- Time zone: UTC−05:00 (EST)
  - Summer (DST): UTC−04:00 (EDT)
- Postal code: HT 7210

Anse-d'Hainault (French pronunciation: [ɑ̃s dɛno]; also Anse-d'Ainault; Haitian Creole: Ansdeno) is a commune in the Anse-d'Hainault Arrondissement, in the Grand'Anse department of Haiti.

Towns and villages in Anse-d'Hainault include: Anse-d'Hainault, Decotelette, Dossous, Duchanino, Escamel and Peligrin.
