= Saint-Ouen-d'Attez =

- Part of Sainte-Marie-d'Attez
- Location of Saint-Ouen-d'Attez
- Location within France Location within Normandy
- Coordinates: 48°48′13″N 0°57′18″E
- Country: France
- Region: Normandy
- Department: Eure
- Arrondissement: Bernay
- Canton: Breteuil
- Commune: Sainte-Marie-d'Attez
- Area^{1}: 9.5 km^{2} (3.7 sq mi)
- Elevation: 200 m (660 ft)
- Highest elevation: 181 m (594 ft)
- Lowest elevation: 155 m (509 ft)
- Population (2023): 290
  - Density: 31/km^{2} (79/sq mi)
- Time zone: UTC+01:00 (CET)
  - Summer (DST): UTC+02:00 (CEST)
- Postal code: 27160
- ^{1} French Land Register data, which excludes lakes, ponds, glaciers > 1 km^{2} (0.386 sq mi or 247 acres) and river estuaries.

Saint-Ouen-d'Attez (French pronunciation: [sɛ̃.t‿wɛ̃ date]) is a former commune in the Eure department in Normandy in northern France. On 1 January 2016, it was merged into the new commune of Sainte-Marie-d'Attez.

== See also ==
- Communes of the Eure department
