= Sainte-Marie-d'Attez =

- Commune
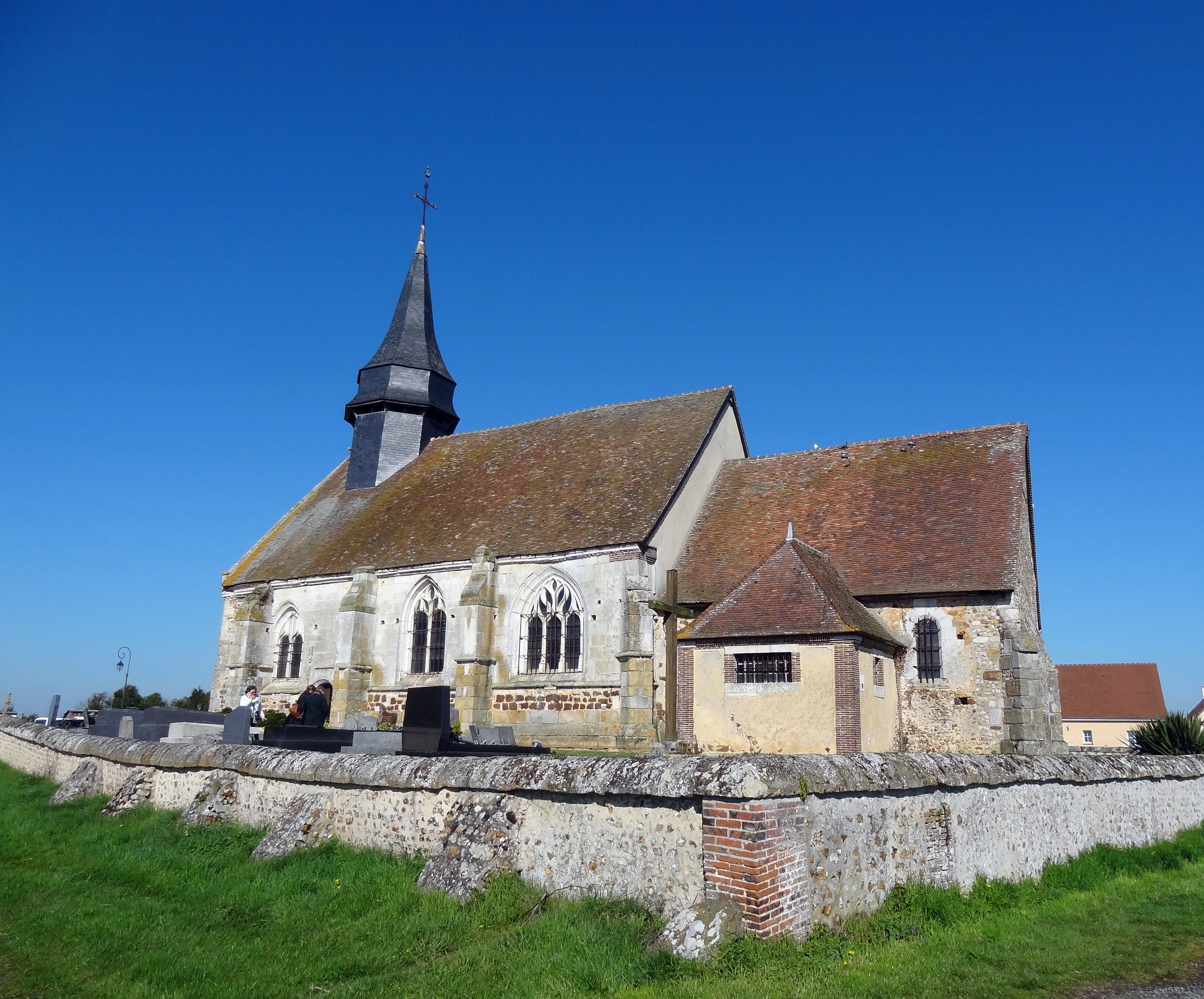
- The church in Sainte-Marie-d'Attez
- Location of Sainte-Marie-d'Attez
- Location within France Location within Normandy
- Coordinates: 48°48′11″N 0°57′14″E
- Country: France
- Region: Normandy
- Department: Eure
- Arrondissement: Bernay
- Canton: Breteuil
- Area^{1}: 26.04 km^{2} (10.05 sq mi)
- Population (2023): 575
  - Density: 22.1/km^{2} (57.2/sq mi)
- Time zone: UTC+01:00 (CET)
  - Summer (DST): UTC+02:00 (CEST)
- INSEE/Postal code: 27578 /27160
- ^{1} French Land Register data, which excludes lakes, ponds, glaciers > 1 km^{2} (0.386 sq mi or 247 acres) and river estuaries.

Sainte-Marie-d'Attez is a commune in the department of Eure, northern France. The municipality was established on 1 January 2016 by merger of the former communes of Dame-Marie, Saint-Nicolas-d'Attez and Saint-Ouen-d'Attez.

== See also ==
- Communes of the Eure department
