= Dammarie =

Dammarie may refer to the following communes in France:

- Dammarie, Eure-et-Loir, in the Eure-et-Loir département
- Dammarie-en-Puisaye, in the Loiret département
- Dammarie-les-Lys, in the Seine-et-Marne département
- Dammarie-sur-Loing, in the Loiret département
- Dammarie-sur-Saulx, in the Meuse département

== See also ==
- Dame-Marie (disambiguation)
