= Pestel, Haiti =

Pestel Pestèl
- Commune
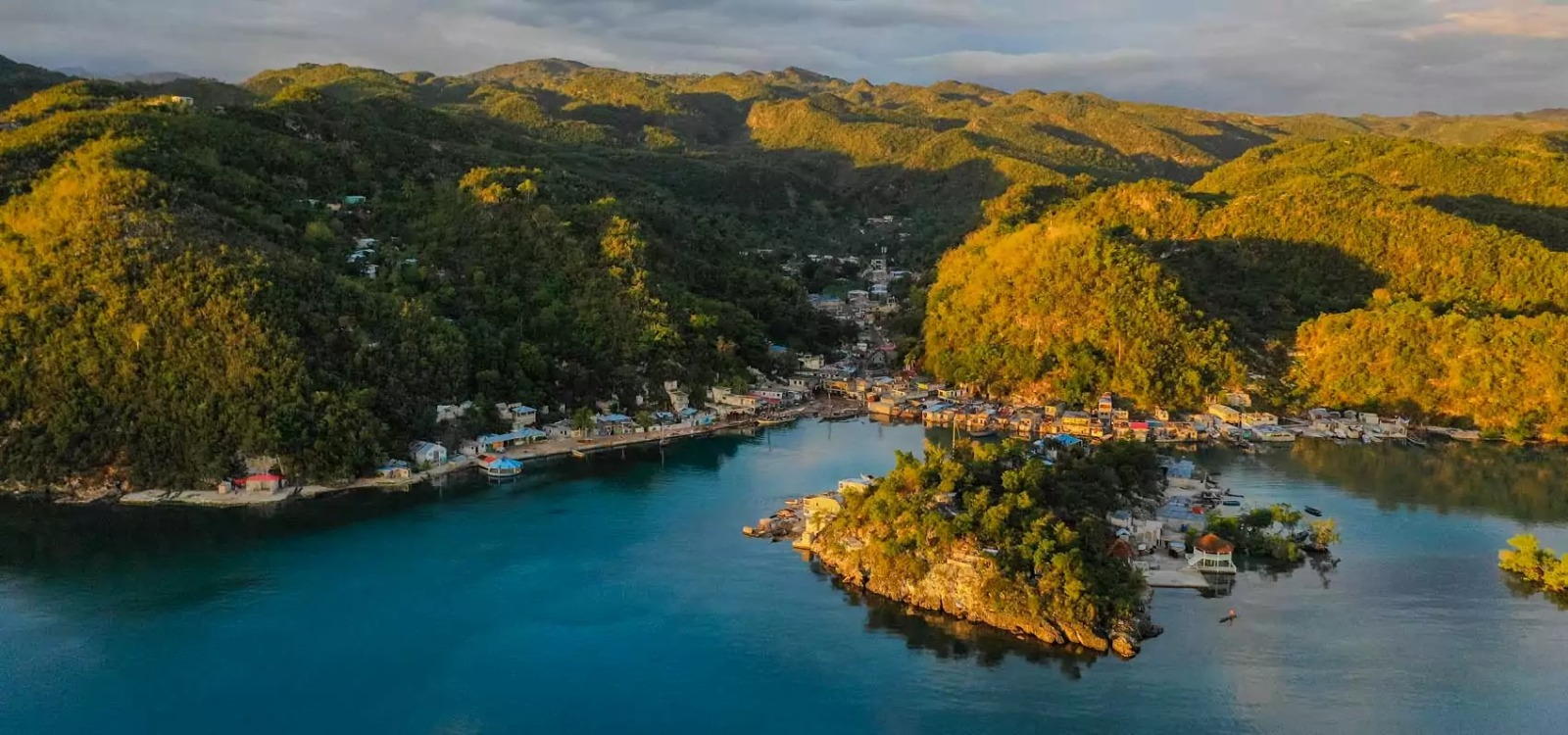
- Pestel
- Interactive map of Pestel
- Location in Haiti
- Coordinates: 18°32′0″N 73°48′0″W
- Country: Haiti
- Department: Grand'Anse
- Arrondissement: Corail

Area
  - Total: 286.77 km^{2} (110.72 sq mi)
- Elevation: 31 m (102 ft)

Population (2015)
  - Total: 44,659
  - Density: 155.73/km^{2} (403.34/sq mi)
- Time zone: UTC−05:00 (EST)
  - Summer (DST): UTC−04:00 (EDT)
- Postal code: HT 7340

Pestel (French pronunciation: [pɛstɛl]; Haitian Creole: Pestèl) is a commune in the Corail Arrondissement, in the Grand'Anse department of Haiti. It has 44,659 inhabitants in 2015. The commune also includes the Cayemite Islands.

== Locations in Pestèl ==
Mainland: Bourjoly, Fond Gondai, Jean Bellune, Joly Guirbert, La Salle, La Source, Lere de L'Eau, Nan Dane, Nan Palmiste, Paviton, Pestèl and Plane Martin, Glode.

Grande Cayemite: Anse a Macon, Anse du Nord, Au Bord de l'Etang, Mare Citron, Nan Palmis and Pointe Sable.
