= Beaumont, Haiti =

Beaumont Bomon
- Commune
- Interactive map of Beaumont
- Location in Haiti
- Coordinates: 18°29′0″N 73°58′0″W
- Country: Haiti
- Department: Grand'Anse
- Arrondissement: Corail

Area
  - Total: 155.34 km^{2} (59.98 sq mi)
- Elevation: 647 m (2,123 ft)

Population (2015)
  - Total: 31,580
  - Density: 203.3/km^{2} (526.5/sq mi)
- Time zone: UTC−05:00 (EST)
  - Summer (DST): UTC−04:00 (EDT)
- Postal code: HT 7330

Beaumont (French pronunciation: [bomɔ̃]; Haitian Creole: Bomon) is a commune in the Corail Arrondissement, in the Grand'Anse department of Haiti. It has 31,580 inhabitants in 2015.

Locations in Beaumont commune include: Beaumont, Flandre and Lacadome.
