= Jean-Baptiste Perrier =

19th-century Haitian slave leader

Jean-Baptiste Perrier (or Duperrier; alias Goman or Gauman) was an ex-slave leader who led a peasant revolt in Southern Grand'Anse, Haiti between 1807 and 1820. For a brief period, he essentially ran a separate, independent government from Haiti's central government.

== Early years ==
Perrier or Duperrier may have a been a slave on the Perrier plantation in the area of the Plaine des Cayes. In 1792, after a plantation revolt, general André Rigaud negotiated a settlement with slaves and masters which included 700 manumissions. Goman may have been one of the affranchis.

== Career ==
Goman, Nicolas Regnier, and Gilles Bénech were ex-slave leaders of the Platons insurrections of 1792–93. Subsequently, Goman became a company captain in the Third Regiment of the legion, though Goman proved to be a chronic deserter. After the civil war, Goman returned to his former master's plantation, again becoming a maroon after the French arrival. He met Jean Panier, and became the leader of his band after Panier's death, joining with Benech and Regnier still later. In 1803, Goman and Regnier had devised a plan of attack against Tiburon, assisted by plantation workers, who had deserted in large numbers, joining the insurrection. They were aided by mulatto officers of the French army.

From 1807 to 1819, Goman led an autonomous farmers' republic that was situated in the southwest. The peasant insurrection was financed by Henri Christophe and he had kept up a Kongo tradition with his group of maroons until 1820. At the height of the insurrection, Goman was essentially running a separate independent government from Haiti's central government. Goman was pursued by Gens. Jérôme Maximilien Borgella and Lys for nine months before his ultimate defeat in 1820.
