= Pierre Mercier (footballer) =

Haitian footballer (born 1982)

Personal information
- Date of birth: 7 June 1982 (age 44)
- Place of birth: Fond Cochon, Haiti
- Height: 1.75 m (5 ft 9 in)
- Position: Full-back

Youth career
- FC Pamiers
- Toulouse Fontaines
- Toulouse

Senior career*
Years	Team	Apps	(Gls)
2001–2002	ASAG Auch		
2002–2003	JS Cugnaux		
2003	Montauban		
2004	Moulins		
2004–2005	Balma		
2005–2006	CS Louhans-Cuiseaux		
2006–2007	US Luzenac		
2007–2008	Toulouse Rodéo		
2008	FC Baulmes		
2009	FC Le Mont		
2009–2010	Gueugnon	16	(0)
2010–2011	FC Pamiers		
2011–2012	Montauban		
2012–2014	Toulouse Rodéo		
2014	Balma	8	(0)
2014–2016	Montauban		
2016–2018	JS Meauzac		
2018–?	AA Grisolles		

International career
2008	Haiti	6	(0)
- * Club domestic league appearances and goals

Pierre Mercier (born 7 June 1982) is a Haitian former professional footballer who played as a full-back. In 2008, he made six appearances for the Haiti national team, playing in the 2010 FIFA World Cup qualifiers. He also holds French citizenship.

== Career ==
Born in Fond Cochon, Haiti in 1982, Mercier was adopted by a family in Pamiers at the age of five, at which point he also started playing football. Following a stint at Toulouse Fontaines, he joined the Toulouse FC youth academy, going on to play for Muret, JS Cugnaux, ASAG Auch, Montauban, Balma, CS Louhans-Cuiseaux, and US Luzenac. At Montauban, he played as a full-back. He played professionally at Gueugnon. For the 2012–13 season, he joined Toulouse Rodéo.

== Personal life ==
As of 2013 Mercier was writing poems.
