= Roseaux =

Roseaux Wozo
- Commune
- Interactive map of Roseaux
- Location in Haiti
- Coordinates: 18°36′0″N 74°1′0″W
- Country: Haiti
- Department: Grand'Anse
- Arrondissement: Corail

Area
  - Total: 216.81 km^{2} (83.71 sq mi)
- Elevation: 76 m (249 ft)

Population (2015)
  - Total: 35,756
  - Density: 164.92/km^{2} (427.14/sq mi)
- Time zone: UTC−05:00 (EST)
  - Summer (DST): UTC−04:00 (EDT)
- Postal code: HT 7320

Roseaux (French pronunciation: [ʁozo]; Haitian Creole: Wozo) is a commune in the Corail Arrondissement, in the Grand'Anse department of Haiti. It has 35,756 inhabitants in 2015.

Settlements in Roseaux: Annete, Boise Sec, Fond d'Acaque, Gomier, Grand Vincent, La Basulle, Nan Plingue and Roseaux
