= Dame-Marie, Eure =

Dame-Marie
- Part of Sainte-Marie-d'Attez
- Location of Dame-Marie
- Location within France Location within Normandy
- Coordinates: 48°48′23″N 0°59′48″E
- Country: France
- Region: Normandy
- Department: Eure
- Arrondissement: Bernay
- Canton: Breteuil
- Commune: Sainte-Marie-d'Attez
- Area^{1}: 11.38 km^{2} (4.39 sq mi)
- Elevation: 177 m (581 ft)
- Highest elevation: 179 m (587 ft)
- Lowest elevation: 163 m (535 ft)
- Population (2023): 119
  - Density: 10.5/km^{2} (27.1/sq mi)
- Time zone: UTC+01:00 (CET)
  - Summer (DST): UTC+02:00 (CEST)
- Postal code: 27160
- ^{1} French Land Register data, which excludes lakes, ponds, glaciers > 1 km^{2} (0.386 sq mi or 247 acres) and river estuaries.

Dame-Marie (French pronunciation: [dam maʁi]) is a former commune in the Eure department in northern France. On 1 January 2016, it was merged into the new commune of Sainte-Marie-d'Attez.

== See also ==
- Communes of the Eure department
