= Corail, Haiti =

Corail Koray
- Commune
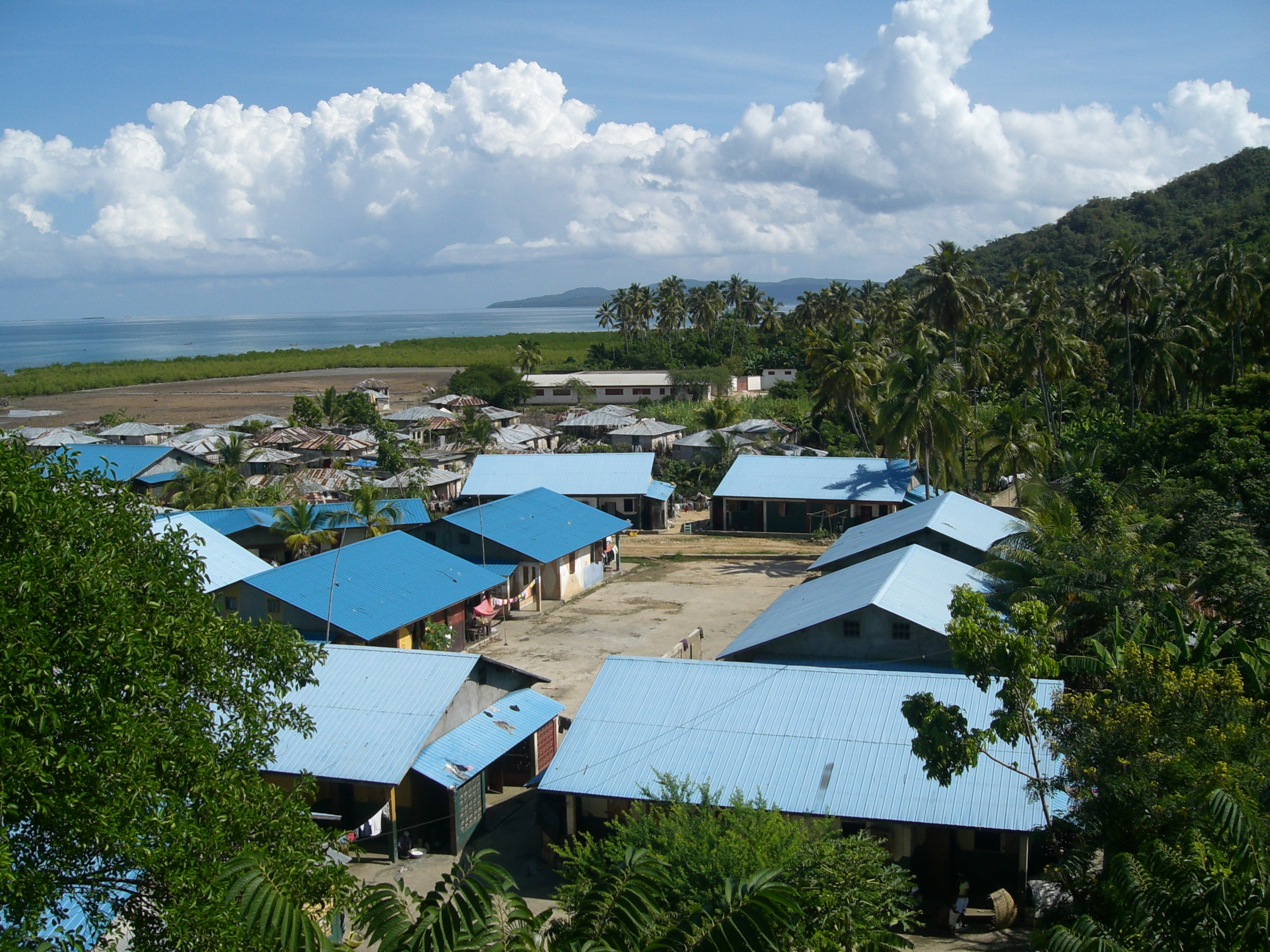
- Interactive map of Corail
- Location in Haiti
- Coordinates: 18°34′0″N 73°53′0″W
- Country: Haiti
- Department: Grand'Anse
- Arrondissement: Corail

Area
  - Total: 108.51 km^{2} (41.90 sq mi)
- Elevation: 155 m (509 ft)

Population (2015)
  - Total: 19,566
  - Density: 180.32/km^{2} (467.01/sq mi)
- Time zone: UTC−05:00 (EST)
  - Summer (DST): UTC−04:00 (EDT)
- Postal code: HT 7310

Corail (French pronunciation: [kɔʁaj]; Haitian Creole: Koray) is a commune in the Corail Arrondissement, in the Grand'Anse department of Haiti. It has 19,566 inhabitants in 2015.

Locations within Corail commune include: Corail, D'lagon, Fond Roge, Gros Basin, Layon Fon, Miyu, Nan Miel and Troupeau.
