= Dame-Marie, Haiti =

Dame-Marie Dam Mari
- Commune
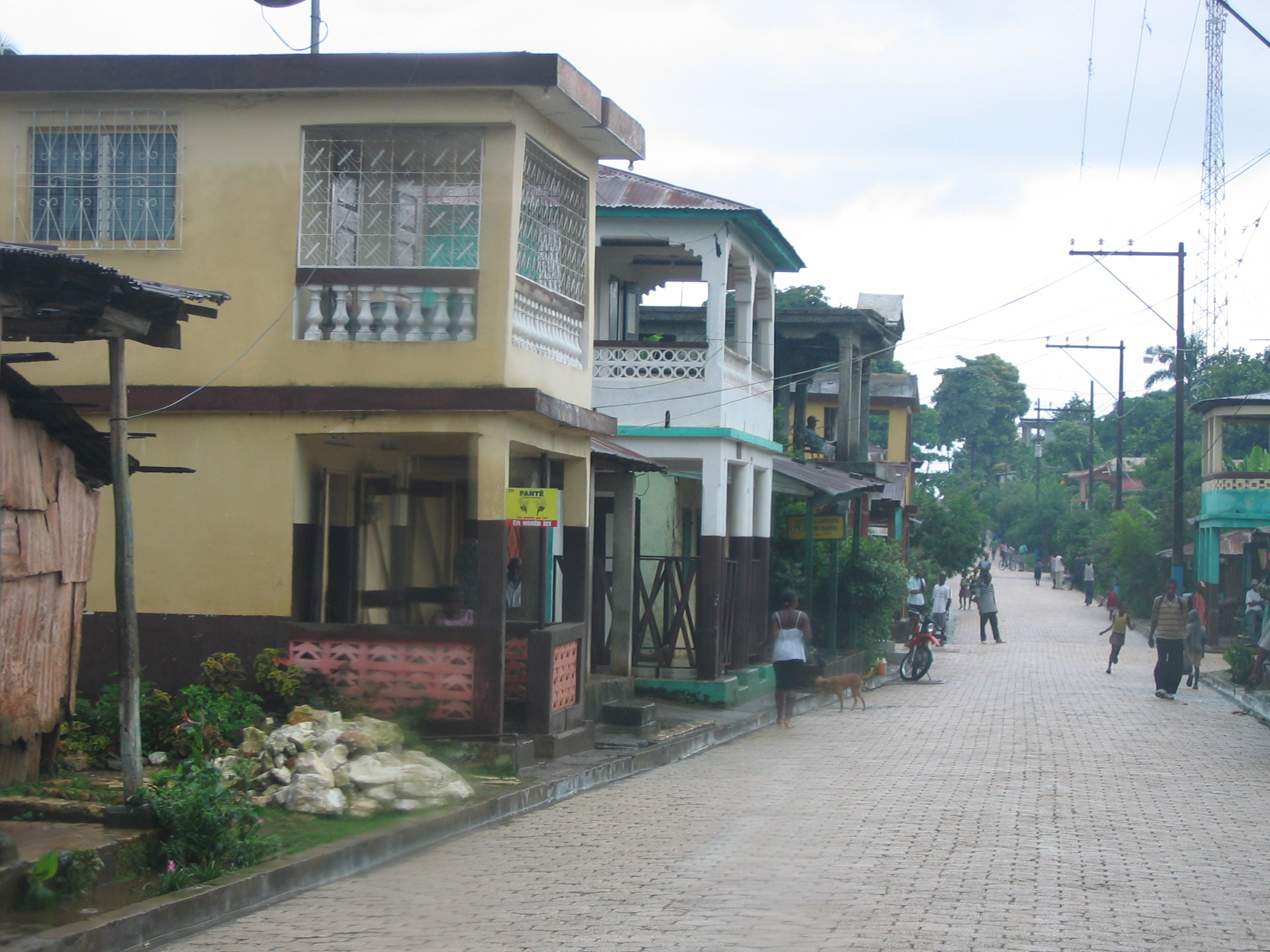
- Streets, Dame-Marie
- Interactive map of Dame-Marie
- Location in Haiti
- Coordinates: 18°34′0″N 74°25′0″W
- Country: Haiti
- Department: Grand'Anse
- Arrondissement: Anse-d'Hainault

Area
  - Total: 102.16 km^{2} (39.44 sq mi)
- Elevation: 114 m (374 ft)

Population (2015)
  - Total: 38,747
  - Density: 379.28/km^{2} (982.32/sq mi)
- Time zone: UTC−05:00 (EST)
  - Summer (DST): UTC−04:00 (EDT)
- Postal code: HT 7220

Dame-Marie (French pronunciation: [dam maʁi]; Haitian Creole: Dam Mari) is a small seaside commune located on the western tip of Haiti, in the arrondissement of Anse-d'Hainault, in the Grand'Anse department of Haiti. The municipality's population according to the 2015 census is 38,747 inhabitants. Unlike other cities in Haiti, nearly all the roads in Dame Marie are paved. Dame Marie is relatively well-developed and has an association for most of the existing trades and professions. Agriculture and fishing are the economic mainstays in the community. The land and sea do offer much potential, but profit margins are barely beyond sustenance due to outmoded equipment, lack of proper storage and poor transportation.

== Other locations in the Dame Marie commune ==
Balandier, Carrefour Malatle, Dame Marie, Durocher, Duvineau, Mandor Doca, Mome, Plaine Griffie and Planche.
