= Les Cayemites =

Island in Haiti

Coordinates: 18°37′0″N 73°45′0″W

Cayemites
Native name: Les Cayemites
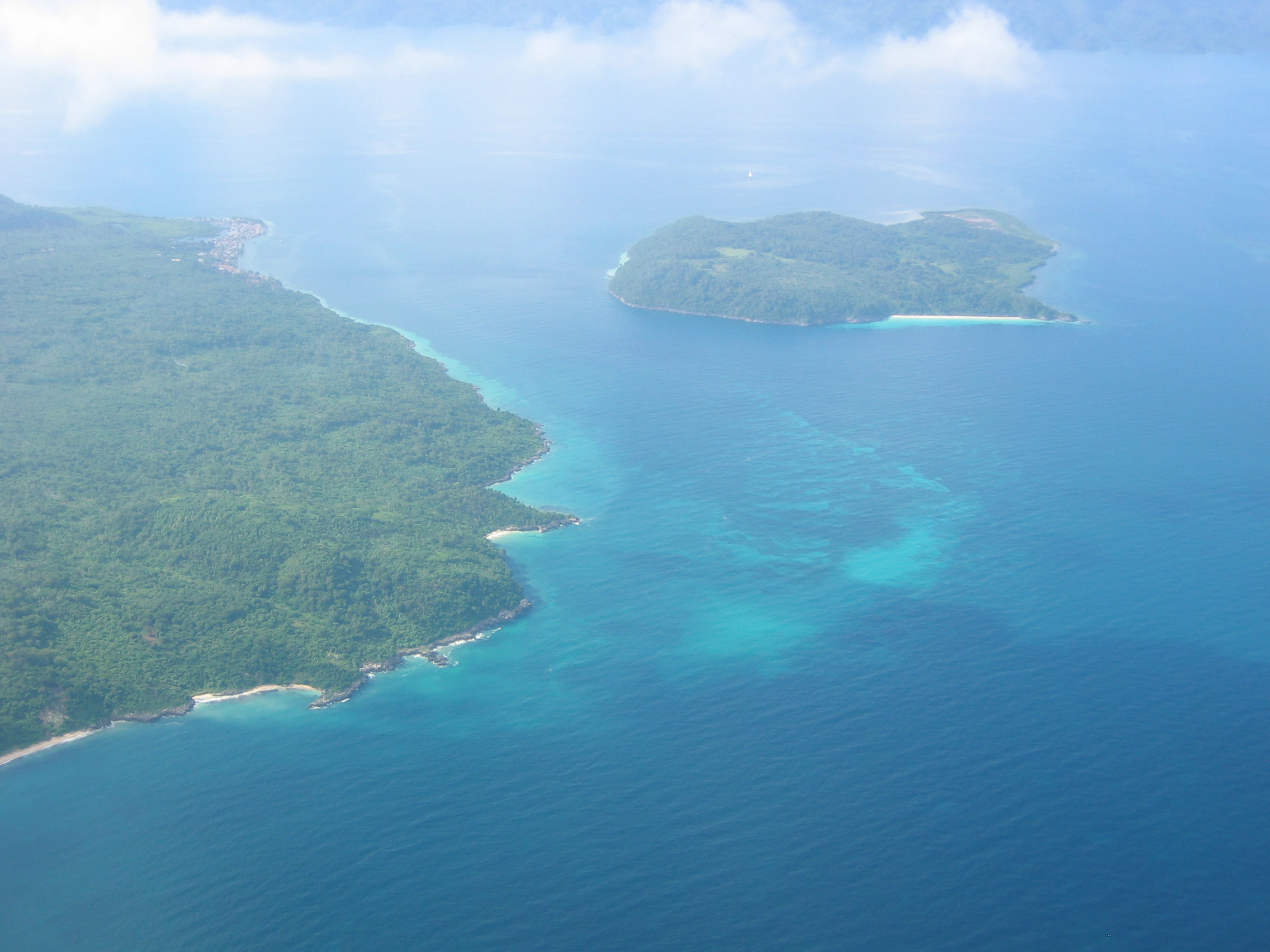
- Cayemite Islands

- Location within Haiti

Geography
- Location: Gulf of Gonâve
- Area: 45 km^{2} (17 sq mi)

Administration
- Haiti
- Department: Grand'Anse
- Largest settlement: Anse â Macon

Demographics
- Population: 5,022 (2009 Estimation)

The Cayemites are a pair of islands located in the Gulf of Gonâve off the coast of southwest Haiti. The two islands, known individually as Grande Cayemite and Petite Cayemite, are a combined 45 square kilometres (17 sq mi) in area. Petite Cayemite lies just west of the larger island, Grande Cayemite. The islands are approximately 35 kilometres (22 mi) east of the city of Jérémie and are in the administrative department of Grand'Anse.

The Cayemites were historically celebrated for their dense forests of rare and valuable woods, most notably Lignum vitae (locally known as guaiac wood).
