= Anse d'Hainault Arrondissement =

Coordinates: 18°34′N 73°53′W

Anse d'Hainault Arrondissement Arrondissement d'Anse d'Hainault Awondisman Ansdeno
- Arrondissement
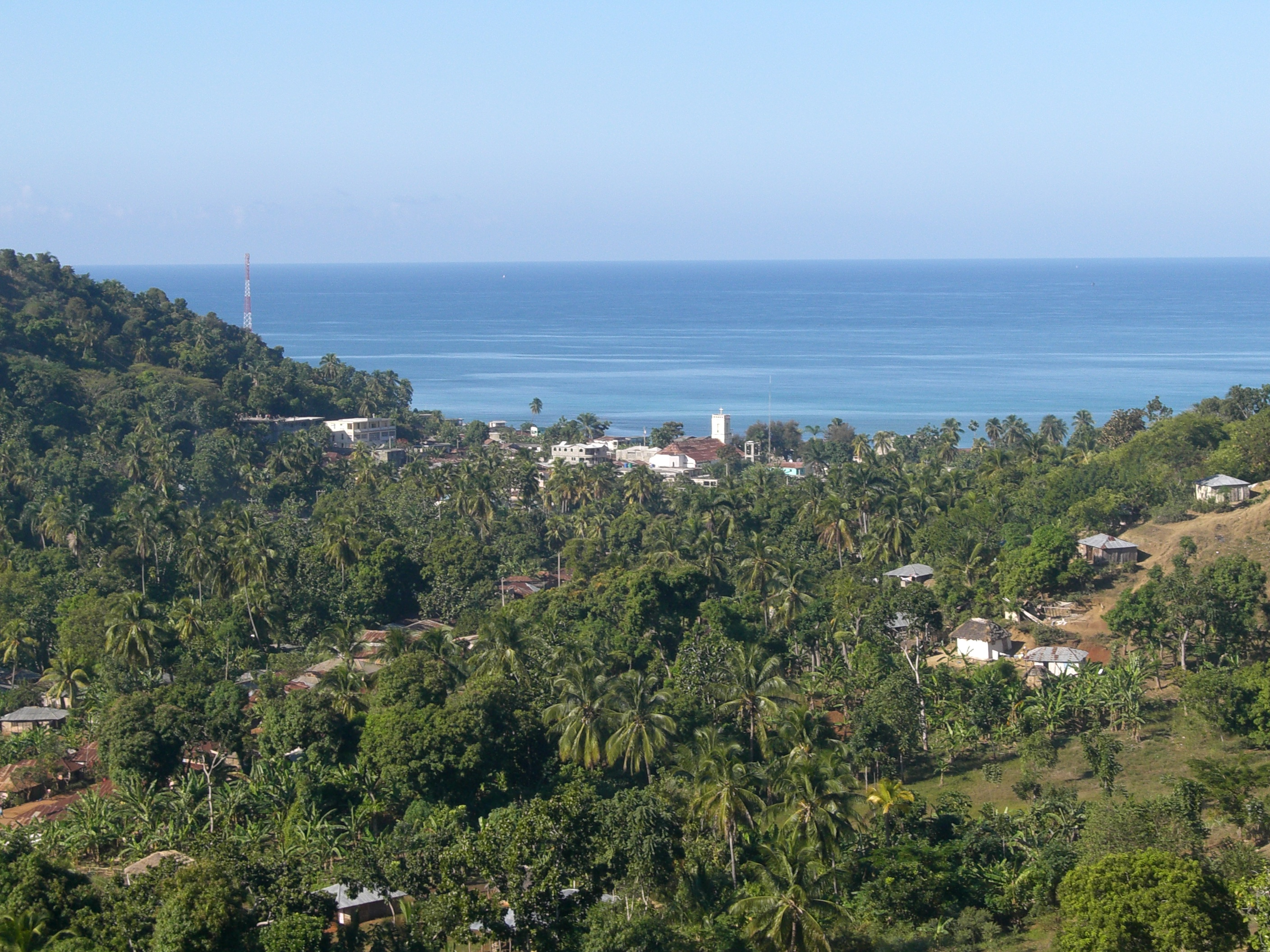
- Anse d'Hainault, Haiti
- Interactive map of Anse d'Hainault Arrondissement
- Country: Haiti
- Department: Grand'Anse

Area
  - Arrondissement: 326.52 km^{2} (126.07 sq mi)
  - Urban: 5.17 km^{2} (2.00 sq mi)
  - Rural: 321.35 km^{2} (124.07 sq mi)

Population (2015)
  - Arrondissement: 98,522
  - Density: 301.73/km^{2} (781.49/sq mi)
  - Urban: 34,041
  - Rural: 64,481
- Time zone: UTC-5 (Eastern)
- Postal code: HT72—
- Communes: 3
- Communal Sections: 12
- IHSI Code: 082

Anse d'Hainault (French pronunciation: [ɑ̃s dɛno]; also Anse-d'Ainault; Haitian Creole: Ansdeno) is an arrondissement of the Grand'Anse Department located in southwestern Haiti. As of 2015, the population was 98,522 inhabitants. Postal codes in the Anse d'Hainault Arrondissement start with the number 72.

== Municipalities ==
The arrondissement consists of the following municipalities:

- Anse d'Hainault
- Dame Marie
- Les Irois

== See also ==
- Arrondissements of Haiti
