= Corail Arrondissement =

Coordinates: 18.5667°N 73.8833°W

Corail Arrondissement Arrondissement de Corail Awondisman Koray
- Arrondissement
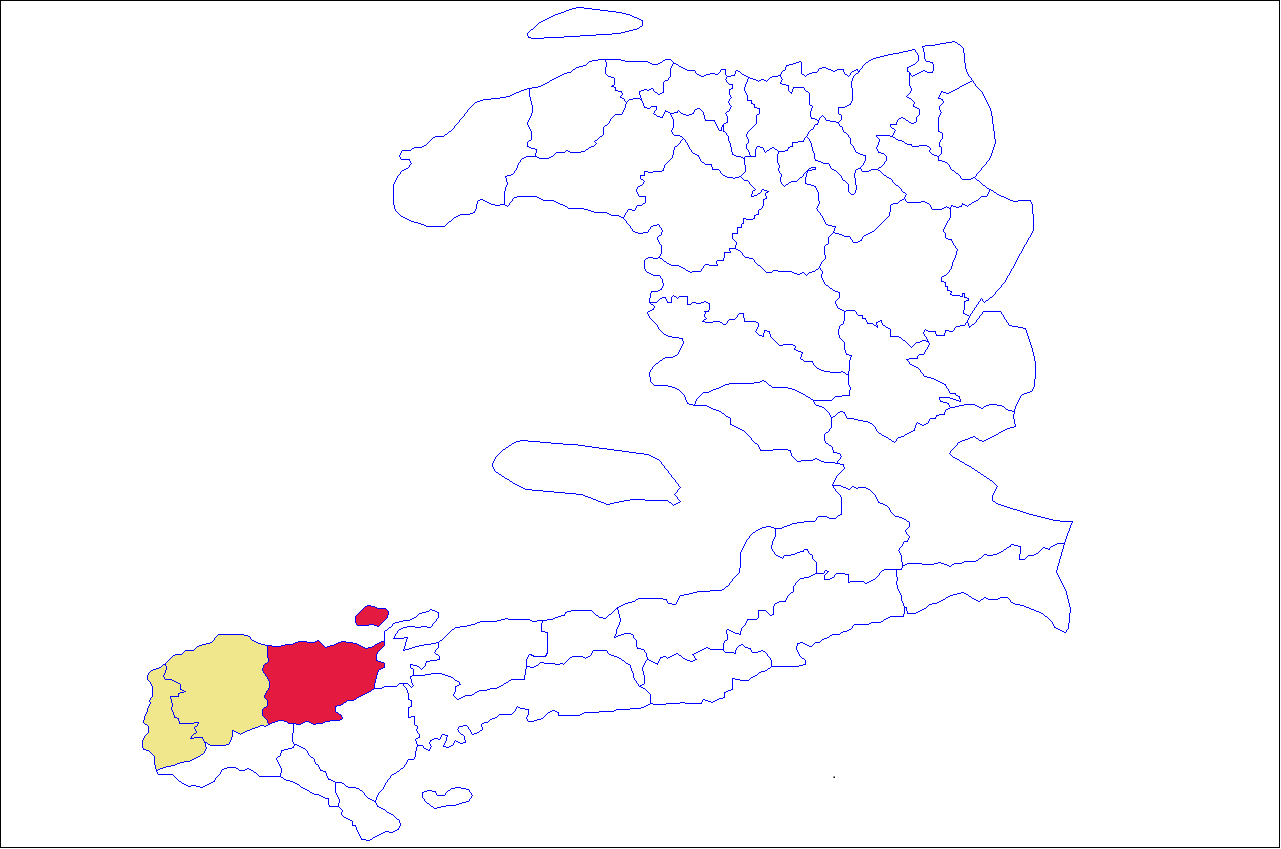
- Interactive map of Corail Arrondissement
- Country: Haiti
- Department: Grand'Anse

Area
  - Arrondissement: 767.43 km^{2} (296.31 sq mi)
  - Urban: 4.5 km^{2} (1.7 sq mi)
  - Rural: 762.93 km^{2} (294.57 sq mi)

Population (2015)
  - Arrondissement: 131,561
  - Density: 171.43/km^{2} (444.00/sq mi)
  - Urban: 18,226
  - Rural: 113,335
- Time zone: UTC-5 (Eastern)
- Postal code: HT73—
- Communes: 4
- Communal Sections: 16
- IHSI Code: 083

Corail (Haitian Creole: Koray) is an arrondissement of the Grand'Anse department, located in southwestern Haiti. As of 2015, the population was 131,561 inhabitants. Postal codes in the Anse d'Hainault Arrondissement start with the number 73.

== Communes ==
The arrondissement contains the following communes:

- Beaumont
- Corail
- Pestel
- Roseaux

== See also ==
- Arrondissements of Haiti
