= Grand'Anse (department) =

Department of Haiti

Coordinates: 18.6667°N 74.1167°W

Grand'Anse Grandans
- Department
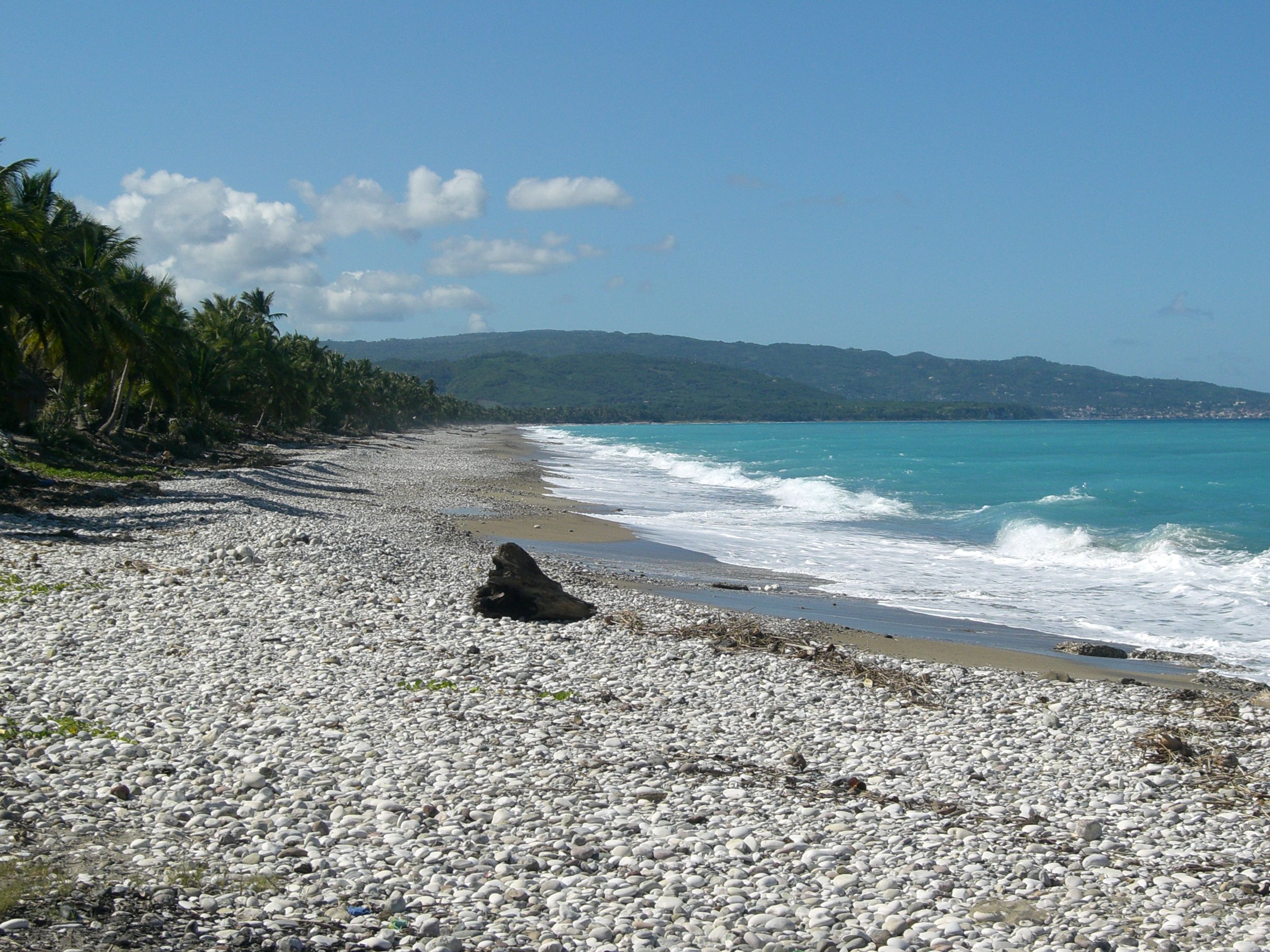
- Gommier, Haiti

- Grand'Anse in Haiti
- Country: Haiti
- Capital: Jérémie
- Région: Tiburon Peninsula
- Symbole: Lanbi-conch enclosed in mountain range

Area
  - Total: 1,911.97 km^{2} (738.22 sq mi)

Population (2015)
  - Total: 468,301
  - Density: 244.931/km^{2} (634.369/sq mi)
- Time zone: UTC-05:00 (EST)
  - Summer (DST): UTC-04:00 (EDT)
- HDI (2017): 0.454 low · 9th

Grand'Anse (/ɡrɒ̃ˈtɒ̃s/, French: [ɡʁɑ̃tɑ̃s]), Grandans or Grantans (Haitian Creole: [ɡɣãtãs]; both meaning "Big Cove") is one of the ten departments of Haiti. Its capital is Jérémie.

== History ==
=== Taino Period ===
Grand'Anse was part of the Xaragua kasika with settlements including Mamey, the modern-day town of Abricot. Abricot is still known today as "the Indian's Paradise."

=== French Period ===
It is said by the locals that the capital city of Jérémie is named after a French fisherman who established himself in the area because of its isolation from the rest of the country. Due to its rather mountainous geography, Grand'Anse did not support many plantations, and was therefore populated largely by white and mixed-race communities with some of the best schools in the colony. Some slaveowners sent their children to schools in Grand'Anse instead of sending them back to France for education.

=== British Period ===
The department was briefly under British control in 1793.

=== Haitian Period ===
==== Haitian Revolution ====
While under the control of André Rigaud, more than 20 slaves died in prison in Jérémie. While their cause of death was not clear, Toussaint Louverture used their deaths as an excuse to portray Rigaud as anti-black and ordered his then-lieutenant Jean-Jacques Dessalines to attack the town. The battle was one of the most important scenes of the Haitian Revolution, with Laurent Férou, an officer, becoming known as the "Liberator of the Grand'Anse." Grand'Anse was the first department to come under the control of the Armée Indigène, and was captured from French troops on 4 August 1803.

==== Independence ====
Férou is a signatory of the Act of Independence of 1 January. The first Haitian Civil War split the country between a monarchy in the north and a republic in the south. Grand'Anse de facto sided with the monarchy under the leadership of Jean-Baptiste Perrier (under the alias Goman) who established a government in the Macaya mountain chain known as the Kongo Kingdom.

Fort Marfranc was constructed under order of Dessalines in order to protect Jérémie. It is the burial place of Férou.

For 20 years the Kongo Kingdom based in Grand-Doco was financed by the self-declared king of the northern monarchy Henri Christophe; Goman was titled duke. The department later fell under the control of the republic under the leadership of Jean-Pierre Boyer.

There were many battles between the national and liberal political parties in Grand'Anse in the 1800s.

==== Modern Period ====
The Grand'Anse department used to be part of the Sud department until 1962 when it was created. The department was reduced further in 2003, with the creation of a new department of Nippes from the Miragoâne and Anse-à-Veau arrondissements.

Before the 2003 split, it had a population of around 600,000 (2002). Afterward, the population at the 2003 Census was 337,516. The area of the department (after the split) is 1,912 square kilometres (738 sq mi).

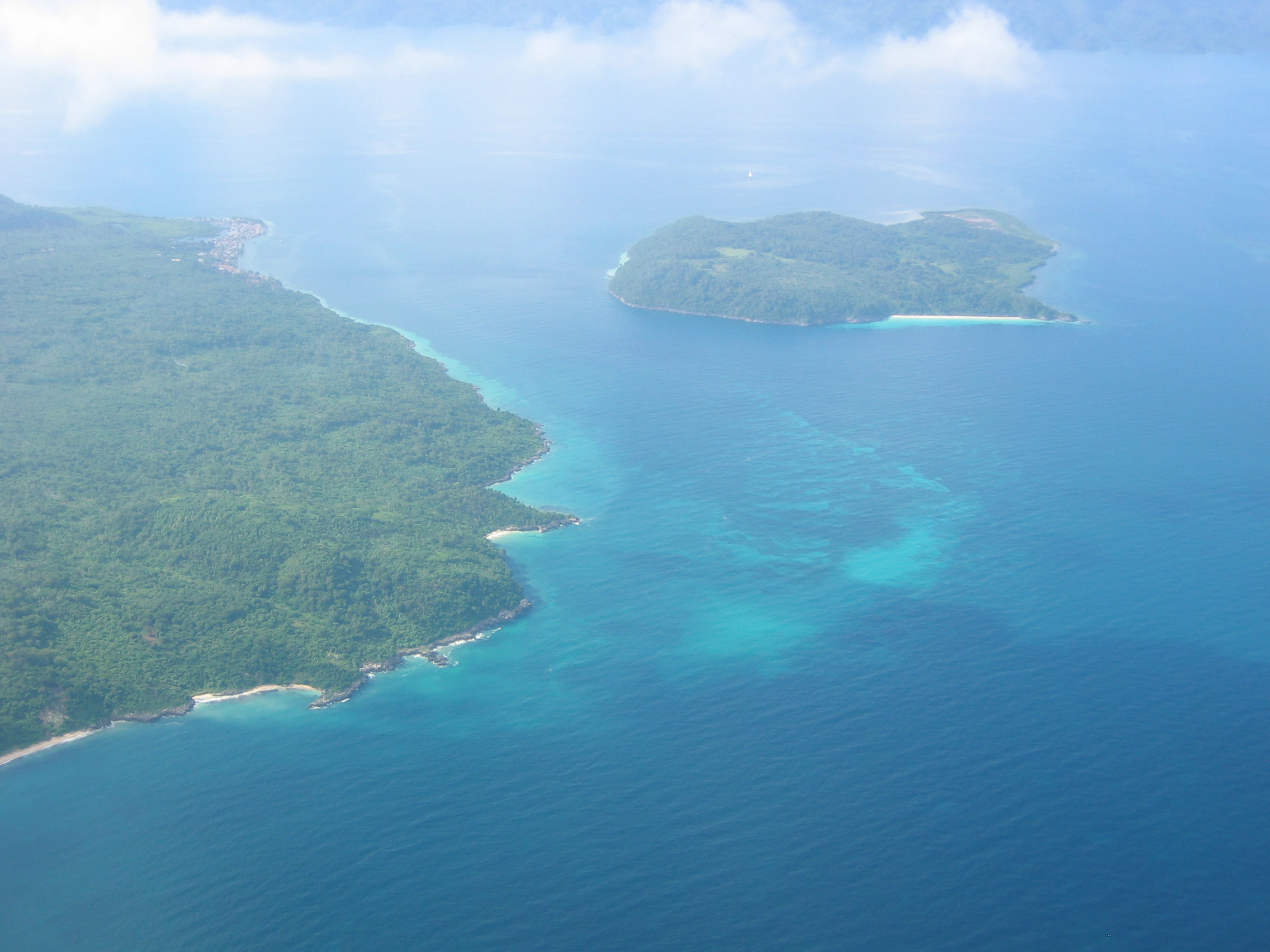
Cayémite Islands

== Geography and environment ==
The department is bordered in the north by the Gulf of Gonave, west by the Winward Passage connecting to Jamaica, south by the South Department, and east by the Nippes Department. It is one of the smallest departments but it is one of the most pollutant-free due to its isolation. The westernmost point in Haiti at Cap les Irois is located in Grand'Anse. The Macaya mountain chain in the Massif de la Hotte holds the second-highest mountain in Haiti and is one of the most important environmental reserves with multiple endemic animals and plants; the Plaintain Garden-Enriquillo faultline passes through it as well. Because of the mountains, it does not have a major plain or plateau for agriculture; however, the Jeremi Valley is still a major agricultural hub. Rivers in the department include the Grand'Anse and Voldrogue rivers. Grand'Anse features many islands, such as Grande Cayemite, Petite Cayemite, the Cayemite reefs and cayes, and Navaasa Island. Navassa is currently the subject of a territorial dispute between Haiti and the United States, which administers it through the US Fish and Wildlife Service.

== Transportation ==
Grand'Anse is one of the most isolated departments in Haiti. Jérémie is the largest port though it is mostly used for cabotage. The Jérémie airport can accommodate national flights from Port-au-Prince.

The RN7 of the Haitian national road system connects Jérémie to Les Cayes. A road connecting it to Nippes has been proposed as well.

== Economy ==
Grand'Anse has large potential in the agro-industry domain and the tourism sector like leisure tourism, eco-tourism, and historical and cultural tourism.

The most famous beaches in the departement are Anse d'Azur and Anse du Clerc.

== Culture ==
The people of Grand'Anse are known for their hospitality and culinary skills, with their most known dish being Tonmtonm-Kalalou. It is a Haitian dish similar to West African Fufu. Many farmers use a pipirit (Haitian bamboo raft) to transport their crops to the market towns.

== Administrative divisions ==
The Department of Grand'Anse is subdivided into three arrondissements, which are further subdivided into thirteen communes.

- Arrondissement of Anse d'Hainault
  - Anse-d'Hainault
  - Dame-Marie
  - Les Irois
- Arrondissement of Corail
  - Corail
  - Beaumont
  - Pestel
  - Roseaux
- Arrondissement of Jérémie
  - Jérémie
  - Abricots
  - Bonbon
  - Chambellan
  - Moron
  - Marfranc
