= History of Haiti =

The recorded history of Haiti began in 1492, when the European captain and invader Christopher Columbus landed on a large island in the region of the western Atlantic Ocean that later came to be known as the Caribbean Sea. The western portion of the island of Hispaniola, where Haiti is situated, was inhabited by Indigenous peoples, who called their island Ayiti. The island was promptly claimed for the Spanish Crown, where it was named La Isla Española ("the Spanish Island"), later Latinized to Hispaniola. By the early 17th century, the French had built a settlement on the west of Hispaniola and called it Saint-Domingue. Prior to the Seven Years' War (1756–1763), the economy of Saint-Domingue gradually expanded, with sugar and, later, coffee becoming important export crops. After the war which had disrupted maritime commerce, the colony underwent rapid expansion. In 1767, it exported indigo, cotton and 72 million pounds of raw sugar. By the end of the century, the colony encompassed a third of the entire Atlantic slave trade.

In 1791, slaves staged a revolt which led to the Haitian Revolution. André Rigaud, leader of the revolution, forced the French to withdraw. When Toussaint Louverture declared independence in 1802, Napoleon sent an invasion force to coerce the Haitians. After the death of Toussaint while in imprisonment by the French, the Generals Jean-Jacques Dessalines, Henri Christophe, and Alexandre Pétion laid heavy battle against Charles Leclerc, the leader of the French invasion. As the tide of the war turned in favor of the Haitians, Napoleon abandoned the invasion, which led to Dessalines declaring the independence of Haiti in 1804. Dessalines orchestrated a massacre of the remaining French population in Haiti, resulting in over 5,000 deaths. Men, women, and children were killed as revenge for Napoleon's invasion. Whites were hanged from gallows along the coast, signaling to passing ships that Haiti had purged itself of Europeans.

Soon after independence, Haiti was proclaimed an empire under Dessalines. When Dessalines was murdered, Haiti then divided off into two regions, controlled by rival regimes, with Christophe ruling the semi-feudal northern State of Haiti and Pétion ruling the more tolerant southern Republic of Haiti. Jean-Pierre Boyer succeeded Pétion in 1811; he consolidated power in the west, taking control of Santo Domingo and thereby unifying Hispaniola. However, the nation struggled economically due to indemnity payments beginning in 1825. In 1843, a revolt overthrew Boyer, plunging Haiti into instability marked by transient presidents until Faustin Soulouque took power in 1847, later declaring himself emperor (1849–1859) before being overthrown by Fabre Geffrard, who restored the republic. From the 1870s to 1890s, the National and Liberal parties competed for influence. Under the presidencies of Florvil Hyppolite and Tirésias Simon Sam, Haiti saw a rare period of stability lasting until the early 20th-century.

Haiti was occupied by the United States from 1915 to 1934. After the occupation, President Sténio Vincent forced through a new constitution that allowed for sweeping powers for the executive branch. The first civilian president, Dumarsais Estimé, ruled for five years until 1950. After a brief period of instability, François Duvalier rose to prominence and painted himself as the legitimate heir to Estimé. His regime is regarded as one of the most repressive and corrupt of modern times; his son, Jean-Claude, saw Haiti's economic and political condition continue to decline, although some of the more fearsome elements of his father's regime were abolished. The period after Duvalier was dominated by the presidency of Jean-Bertrand Aristide until his downfall in two coup d'états in 1991 and 2004. A major 7.0 magnitude earthquake hit the country in 2010 and caused widespread devastation.

== Pre-Spanish history ==
Successive waves of Arawakan-speaking migrants, moving northward from the Orinoco delta in South America, settled the islands of the Caribbean. Around 600 AD, the Taíno, an Arawak culture, arrived on the island, displacing the previous inhabitants, however this view is widely disputed. They were organized into cacicazgos (chiefdoms), each led by a cacique (chief).

According to the Puerto Rican historian Cayetano Coll y Toste, the German explorer Carl Friedrich Philipp von Martius was the first person to describe the Indigenous peoples of Haiti as "Taini" (Taino). The archaeologist L. Antonio Curet has written that von Martius described these peoples as "Taini...perhaps by mistaking the qualifier for an ethnonym".

== Spanish history (1492–1625) ==
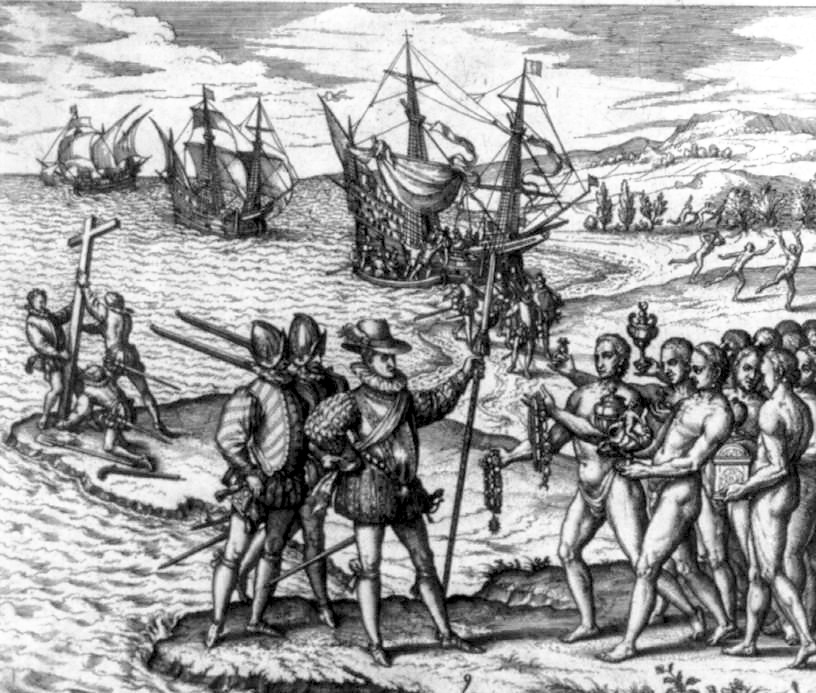
Christopher Columbus landing on the island of Hispaniola in 1492

Christopher Columbus established the settlement, La Navidad, near the modern town of Cap-Haïtien. It was built from the timbers of his wrecked ship, the Santa María, during his first voyage in December 1492. When he returned in 1493 on his second voyage he found the settlement had been destroyed and all 39 settlers killed. Columbus continued east and founded a new settlement at La Isabela on the territory of the present-day Dominican Republic in 1493. The capital of the colony was moved to Santo Domingo in 1496, on the southwest coast of the island, also in the territory of the present-day Dominican Republic. The Spanish returned to western Hispaniola in 1502, establishing a settlement at Yaguana, near modern-day Léogâne. A second settlement was established on the north coast in 1504 called Puerto Real, near modern Fort-Liberté – which in 1578 was relocated to a nearby site and renamed Bayaja.

Following the arrival of Europeans, La Hispaniola's Indigenous population was nearly extinguished, in possibly the worst case of depopulation in the Americas. A commonly accepted hypothesis attributes the high mortality of this colony in part to European diseases to which the natives had no immunity. There is still heated debate over the population of Indigenous people on the island of Hispaniola in 1492 just prior to European arrival, but estimates range from no more than a few tens of thousands, according to a 2020 genetic analysis, to upwards of 750,000. The Indigenous population declined by up to 95% in the century after the Spanish arrival, to a few thousand left. Many authors have described the treatment of the Indigenous peoples in Hispaniola under the Spanish Empire as genocide.

A small number of Taínos were able to survive and set up villages elsewhere. Spanish interest in Hispaniola began to wane in the 1520s, as more lucrative gold and silver deposits were found in Mexico and South America. Thereafter, the population of Spanish Hispaniola grew at a slow pace.

The settlement of Yaguana was burnt to the ground three times in its just over a century-long existence as a Spanish settlement, first by French pirates in 1543, again on 27 May 1592; by a 110-strong landing party from a four-ship English naval squadron led by Christopher Newport in his flagship Golden Dragon, who destroyed all 150 houses in the settlement; and finally by the Spanish themselves in 1605, for reasons set out below.

In 1595, the Spanish, frustrated by the twenty-year rebellion of their Dutch subjects, closed their home ports to rebel shipping from the Netherlands, cutting them off from the critical salt supplies necessary for their herring industry. The Dutch responded by sourcing new salt supplies from Spanish America, where colonists were more-than-happy to trade. Large numbers of Dutch traders/pirates joined their English and French brethren trading on the remote coasts of Hispaniola. In 1605, Spain was infuriated that Spanish settlements on the northern and western coasts of the island persisted in carrying out large-scale and illegal trade with the Dutch, who were at that time fighting a war of independence against Spain in Europe, and the English, a very recent enemy state, and so decided to forcibly resettle their inhabitants closer to the city of Santo Domingo. This action, known as the Devastaciones de Osorio, proved disastrous for the colonists; more than half of the resettled colonists died of starvation or disease, over 100,000 cattle were abandoned, and many slaves escaped. Five of the existing thirteen settlements on the island were brutally razed by Spanish troops, including the two settlements on the territory of present-day Haiti, La Yaguana and Bayaja. Many of the inhabitants fought, escaped to the jungle, or fled to the safety of passing Dutch ships.

This Spanish action was counterproductive as English, Dutch, and French pirates were now free to establish bases on the island's abandoned northern and western coasts, where wild cattle were now plentiful and free. In 1697, after decades of fighting over the territory, the Spanish ceded the western part of the island to the French, who henceforth called it Saint-Domingue. Saint-Domingue developed into a highly lucrative colony for France. Its economy was based on a labor-intensive sugar industry, which depended on vast numbers of West African slaves. Meanwhile, the situation on the Spanish part of the island deteriorated. The entire Spanish empire sank into a deep economic crisis, and Santo Domingo was in addition struck by earthquakes, hurricanes, and a shrinking population.

== French Saint-Domingue (1625–1789) ==
=== Early French Saint-Domingue (1625–1711) ===
The French built a settlement on the west coast of Hispaniola, which was known as 'the most fertile part of the West Indies'. Prior to gaining its independence in 1804, Haiti was the French colony of Saint-Domingue. Under French rule, Saint-Domingue grew to be the wealthiest colony in the French empire and, perhaps, the richest colony in the world. Shortly before the Haitian Revolution, Saint-Domingue produced roughly 40 percent of the sugar and 60 percent of the coffee imported to Europe.

The colonial economy of Saint-Domingue was based almost entirely on the production of plantation crops for export. Enslaved African workers grew sugar in the northern plains around Cap Français, for example, and coffee in the mountainous interior. The slave system in Saint-Domingue was regarded as one of the harshest in the Americas, with high levels of both mortality and violence. To supply the plantation system, French owners imported almost 800,000 Africans to the colony (which, by comparison, is almost double the number of Africans carried to North America).

=== Pearl of the Antilles (1711–1789) ===
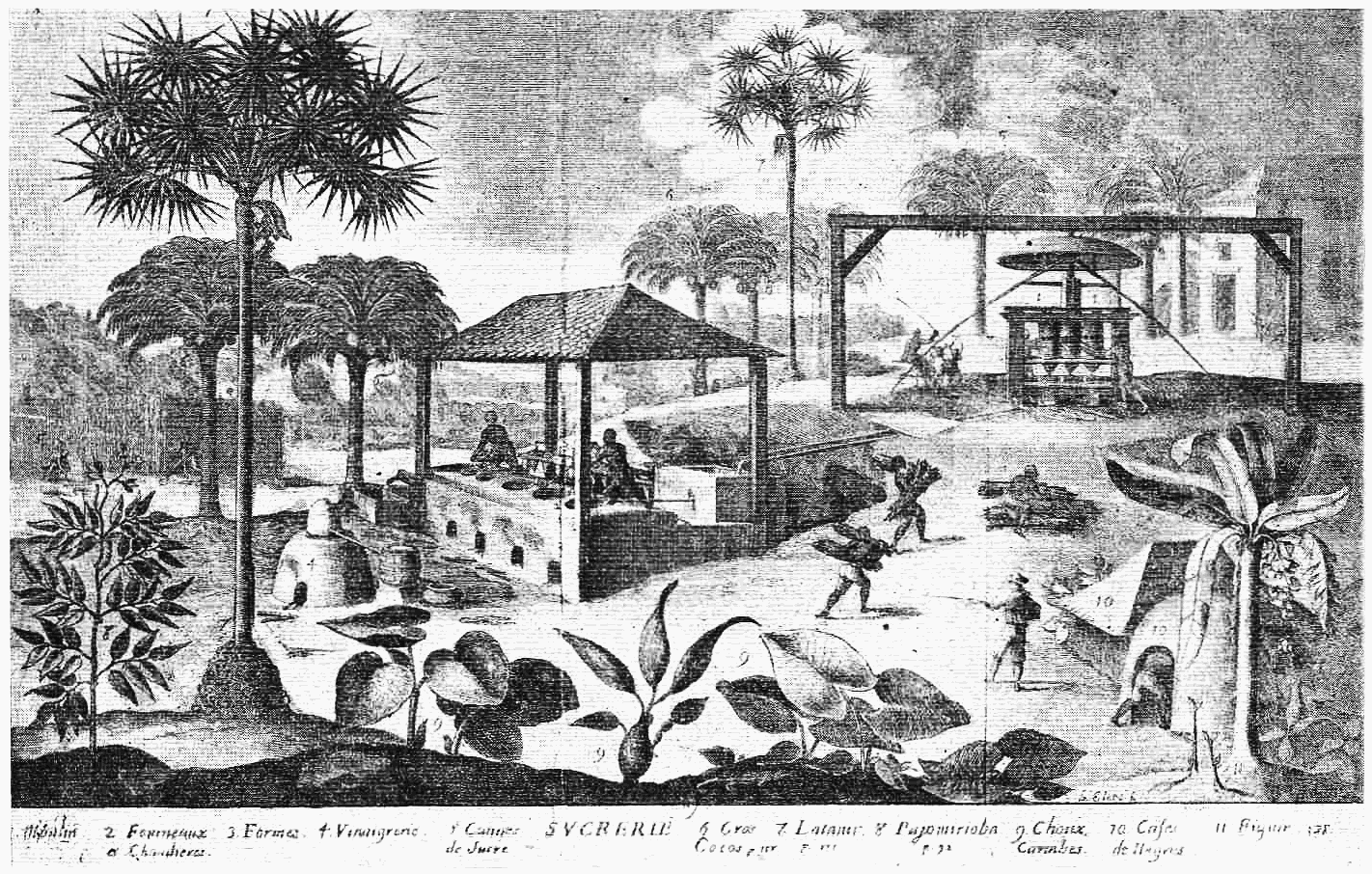
A sugar mill in Haiti (L'Homme et la Terre by Élisée Reclus, 1830–1905)

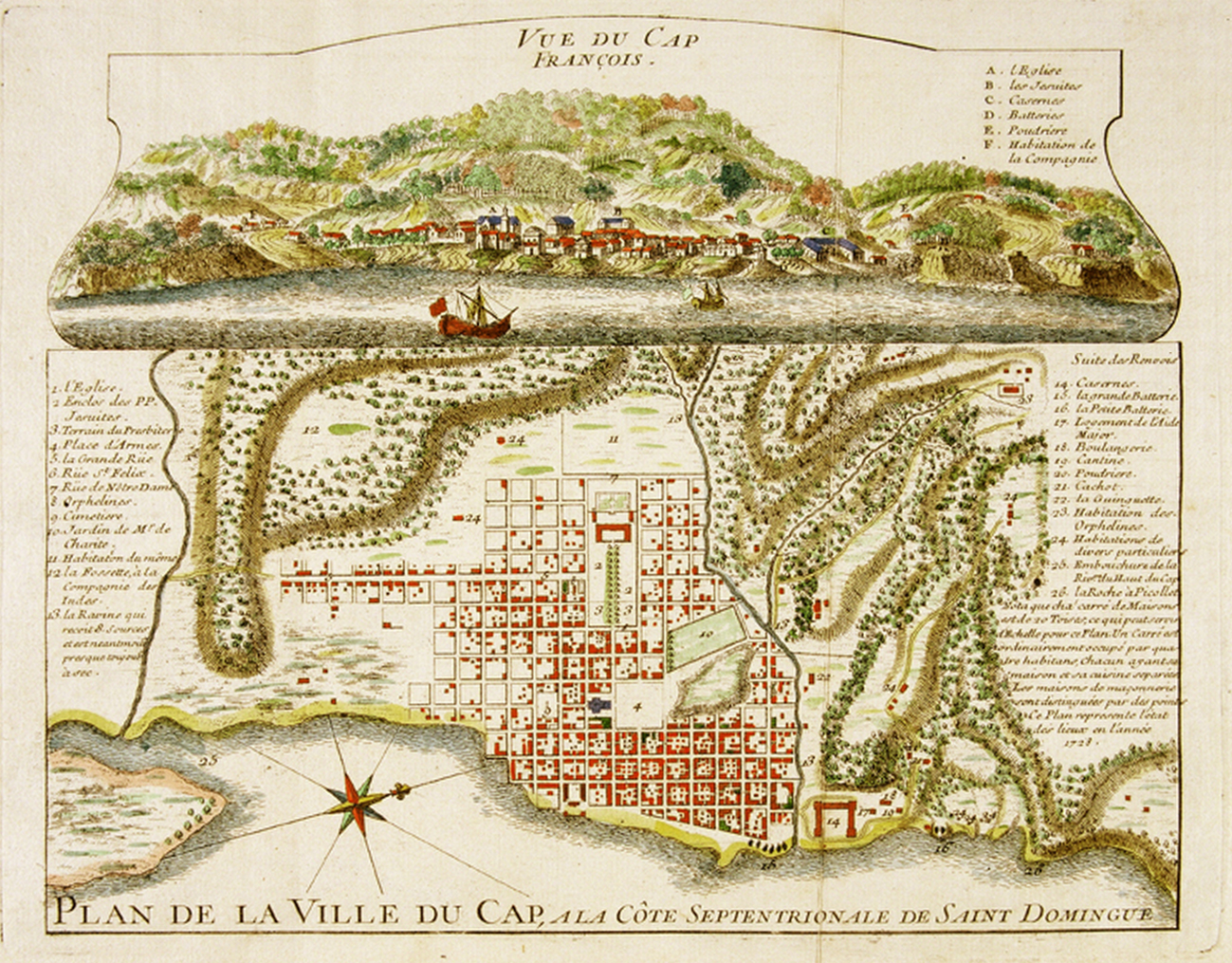
Engraving of Cap-Français in 1728

In 1711, the city of Cap-Français was formally established by Louis XIV and took over as capital of the colony from Port-de-Paix. In 1726, the city of Les Cayes was founded on the Southern coast; it became the biggest settlement in the south. In 1749, the city of Port-au-Prince was established on the west coast, which in 1770 took over as the capital of the colony from Cap-Français; however that same year the 1770 Port-au-Prince earthquake and tsunami destroyed the city, killing 200 people immediately, and 30,000 later from famine and disease brought on by the natural disaster. This was the second major earthquake to hit Saint-Domingue as it followed the 1751 Port-au-Prince earthquake, which had left only a single stone-built building standing in the town.

Prior to the Seven Years' War (1756–1763), the economy of Saint-Domingue gradually expanded, with sugar and, later, coffee becoming important export crops. After the war, which disrupted maritime commerce, the colony underwent rapid expansion. In 1767 it exported 72 million pounds of raw sugar and 51 million pounds of refined sugar, one million pounds of indigo, and two million pounds of cotton. Saint-Domingue became known as the "Pearl of the Antilles" – the richest colony in the 18th-century French empire. By the 1780s, Saint-Domingue produced about 40 percent of all the sugar and 60 percent of all the coffee consumed in Europe. This single colony, roughly the size of Hawaii or Belgium, produced more sugar and coffee than all of Britain's West Indian colonies combined.

In the second half of the 1780s, Saint-Domingue accounted for a third of the entire Atlantic slave trade. The population of the African slaves imported for these plantations is estimated to have been 790,000. Between 1764 and 1771, the average importation of slaves varied between 10,000 and 15,000, by 1786 about 28,000, and, from 1787 onward, the colony received more than 40,000 West African slaves a year. However, the inability to maintain slave numbers without constant resupply from Central and West Africa meant the slave population, by 1789, totaled 500,000. This was ruled over by a white population that, by 1789, numbered only 32,000. At all times, a majority of slaves in the colony were African-born, as the brutal conditions of slavery prevented the population from experiencing growth through natural increase. African culture thus remained strong among slaves to the end of French rule, in particular the folk-religion of Vodou, which commingled Catholic liturgy and ritual with the beliefs and practices of Guinea, Congo and Benin.

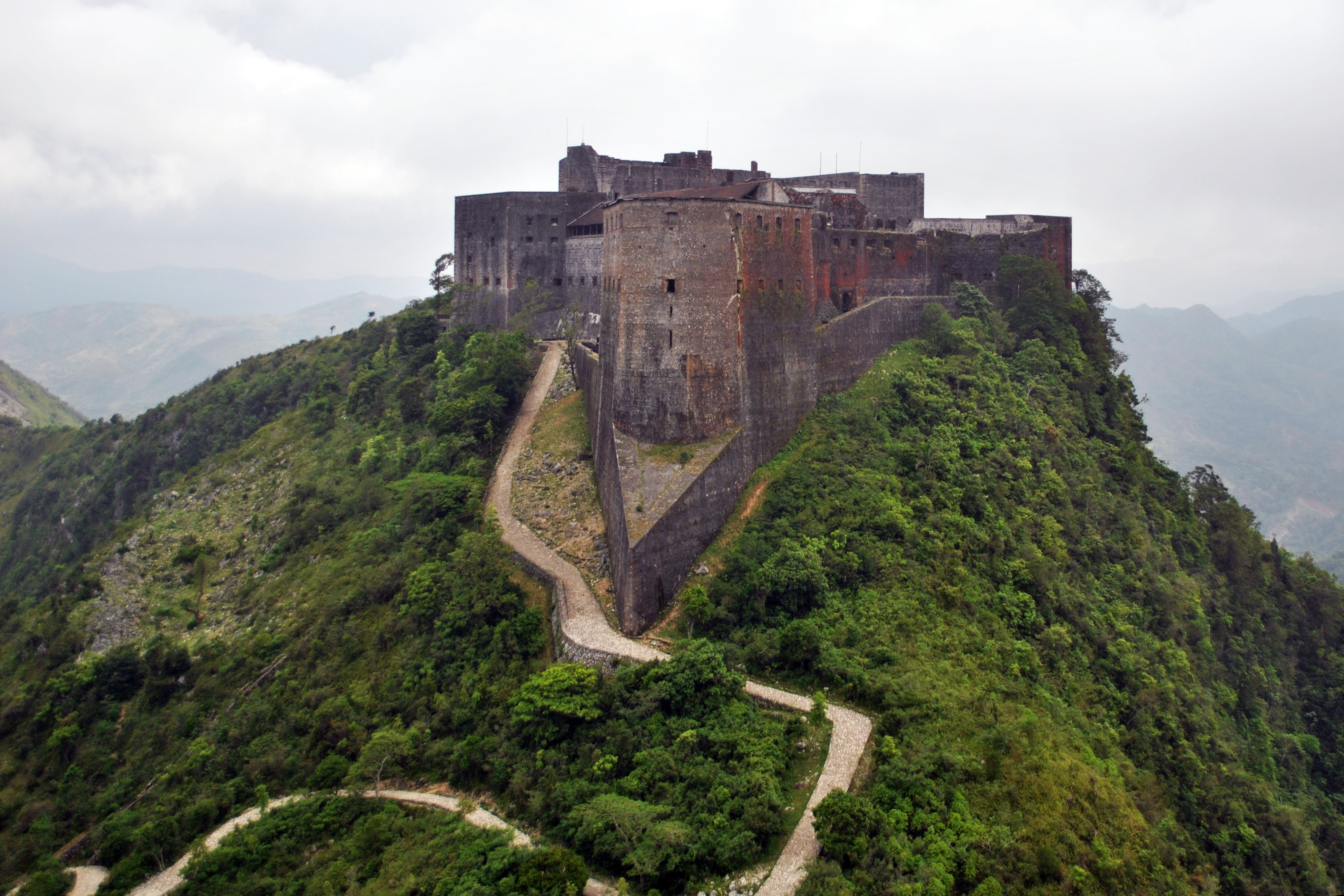
Citadelle Laferrière, built by Henri Christophe, is the largest fortress in the Americas.

To govern slavery, in 1685 Louis XIV enacted the Code Noir, which accorded certain human rights to slaves and responsibilities to the master, who was obliged to feed, clothe, and provide for the general well-being of their slaves. The code noir also sanctioned corporal punishment, allowing masters to employ brutal methods to instill in their slaves the necessary docility while ignoring provisions intended to regulate the administration of punishments. A passage from Henri Christophe's personal secretary, who lived more than half his life as a slave, describes the crimes perpetrated against the slaves of Saint-Domingue by their French masters:

Have they not hung up men with heads downward, drowned them in sacks, crucified them on planks, buried them alive, crushed them in mortars? Have they not forced them to eat excrement? And, having flayed them with the lash, have they not cast them alive to be devoured by worms, or onto anthills, or lashed them to stakes in the swamp to be devoured by mosquitoes? Have they not thrown them into boiling cauldrons of cane syrup? Have they not put men and women inside barrels studded with spikes and rolled them down mountainsides into the abyss? Have they not consigned these miserable blacks to man-eating dogs until the latter, sated by human flesh, left the mangled victims to be finished off with bayonet and poniard?"

Thousands of slaves found freedom by fleeing from their masters, forming communities of maroons, and raiding isolated plantations. The most famous was Mackandal, a one-armed slave, originally from Guinea, who escaped in 1751. A Vodou Houngan (priest), he united many of the different maroon bands. He spent the next six years staging successful raids and evading capture by the French, reputedly killing over 6,000 people while preaching a fanatic vision of the destruction of white civilization in St. Domingue. In 1758, after a failed plot to poison the drinking water of the plantation owners, he was captured and burned alive at the public square in Cap-Français.

Saint-Domingue also had the largest and wealthiest free population of color in the Caribbean, the gens de couleur (French, "people of color"). The mixed-race community in Saint-Domingue numbered 25,000 in 1789. First-generation gens de couleur were typically the offspring of a male, French slaveowner, and an African slave chosen as a concubine. In the French colonies, the semi-official institution of "plaçage" defined this practice. By this system, the children were free people and could inherit property, thus originating a class of "mulattos" with property and some with wealthy fathers. This class occupied a middle status between African slaves and French colonists. Africans who attained freedom also enjoyed status as gens de couleur.

As the numbers of gens de couleur grew, the French rulers enacted discriminatory laws. Statutes forbade gens de couleur from taking up certain professions, marrying whites, wearing European clothing, carrying swords or firearms in public, or attending social functions where whites were present. However, these regulations did not restrict their purchase of land, and many accumulated substantial holdings and became slave owners themselves. By 1789, they owned one third of the plantation property and one quarter of the slaves of Saint-Domingue. Central to the rise of the gens de couleur planter class was the growing importance of coffee, which thrived on the marginal hillside plots to which they were often relegated. The largest concentration of gens de couleur was in the southern peninsula, the last region of the colony to be settled, owing to its distance from Atlantic shipping lanes and its formidable terrain, with the highest mountain range in the Caribbean.

== Revolutionary period (1789–1804) ==
As the unofficial leader of the revolution, Toussaint L'Ouverture is considered the father of Haiti.

=== Ogé's revolt (1789–1791) ===
The outbreak of revolution in France in the summer of 1789 had a powerful effect on the colony. While the French settlers debated how new revolutionary laws would apply to Saint-Domingue, outright civil war broke out in 1790 when the free men of color claimed they too were French citizens under the terms of the Declaration of the Rights of Man and of the Citizen. Ten days before the fall of the Bastille, in July 1789, the French National Assembly had voted to seat six delegates from Saint-Domingue. In Paris, a group of wealthy mulattoes, led by Julien Raimond and Vincent Ogé, unsuccessfully petitioned the white planter delegates to support mulatto claims for full civil and political rights. Through the efforts of a group called Société d'Amis des Noirs, of which Raimond and Ogé were prominent leaders, in March 1790 the National Assembly granted full civic rights to the gens de couleur. Vincent Ogé traveled to St. Domingue to secure the promulgation and implementation of this decree, landing near Cap-Français (now Cap-Haïtien) in October 1790 and petitioning the royal governor, the Comte de Peynier. After his demands were refused, he attempted to incite the gens de couleur to revolt. Ogé and Jean-Baptiste Chavennes, a veteran of the Siege of Savannah during the American Revolution, attempted to attack Cap-Français. However, the mulatto rebels refused to arm or free their slaves, or to challenge the status of slavery, and their attack was defeated by a force of white militia and black volunteers (including Henri Christophe). Afterward, they fled across the frontier to Hinche, at the time in the Spanish part of the island. However, they were captured, returned to the French authorities, and both Ogé and Chavannes were executed in February 1791.

=== Slave uprising (1791–1793) ===
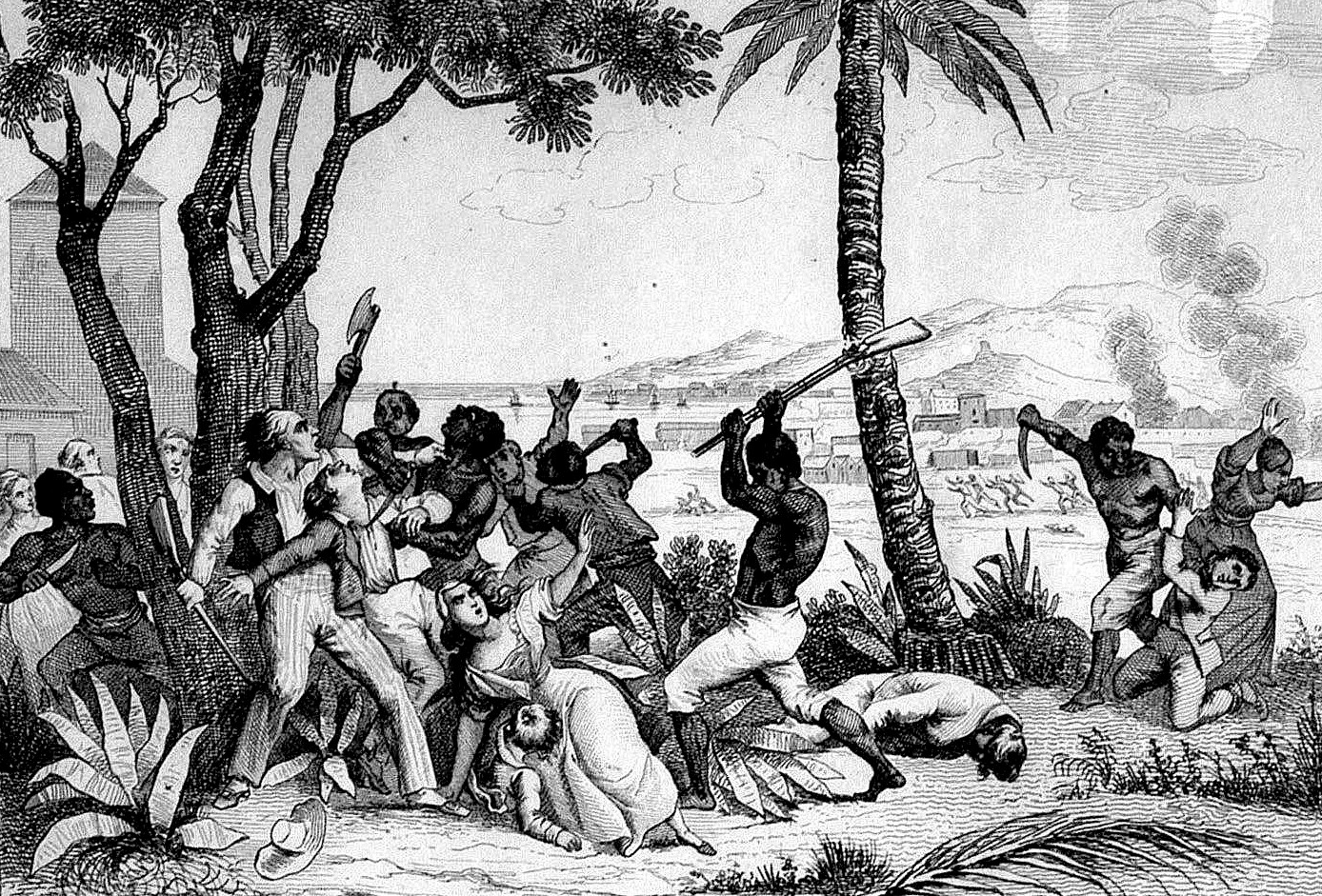
"Burning of the Plaine du Cap – Massacre of whites by the blacks". On 22 August 1791, slaves set fire to plantations, torched cities, and massacred the white population.

A vodou ceremony at Bois Caïman (Alligator Woods) near Cap-Français on 14 August 1791, presided over by a houngan (Vodou priest) named Dutty Boukman, is traditionally considered to mark the beginning of the Haitian Revolution. Following this ceremony, slaves in the northern region of the colony staged a revolt, and although Boukman was captured and executed, the rebellion continued to spread rapidly throughout the entire colony. Beginning in September, some thirteen thousand slaves and rebels in the south, led by Romaine-la-Prophétesse, freed slaves and took supplies from and burned plantations, ultimately occupying the area's two major cities, Léogâne and Jacmel.

In 1792, Léger-Félicité Sonthonax and two other national commissioners were sent to the colony by the French Legislative Assembly as part of a Revolutionary Commission. Sonthonax's main goal was to maintain French control of Saint-Domingue, stabilize the colony, and enforce the social equality recently granted to free people of color by the National Convention of France. In March 1792, a coalition of whites and conservative free blacks and forces led by another of the national commissioners, Edmond de Saint-Léger, put down Romaine-la-Prophétesse's revolt after André Rigaud, who led free black confederate forces based near Port-au-Prince, declined to ally with it.

=== Toussaint Louverture ascendant (1793–1802) ===
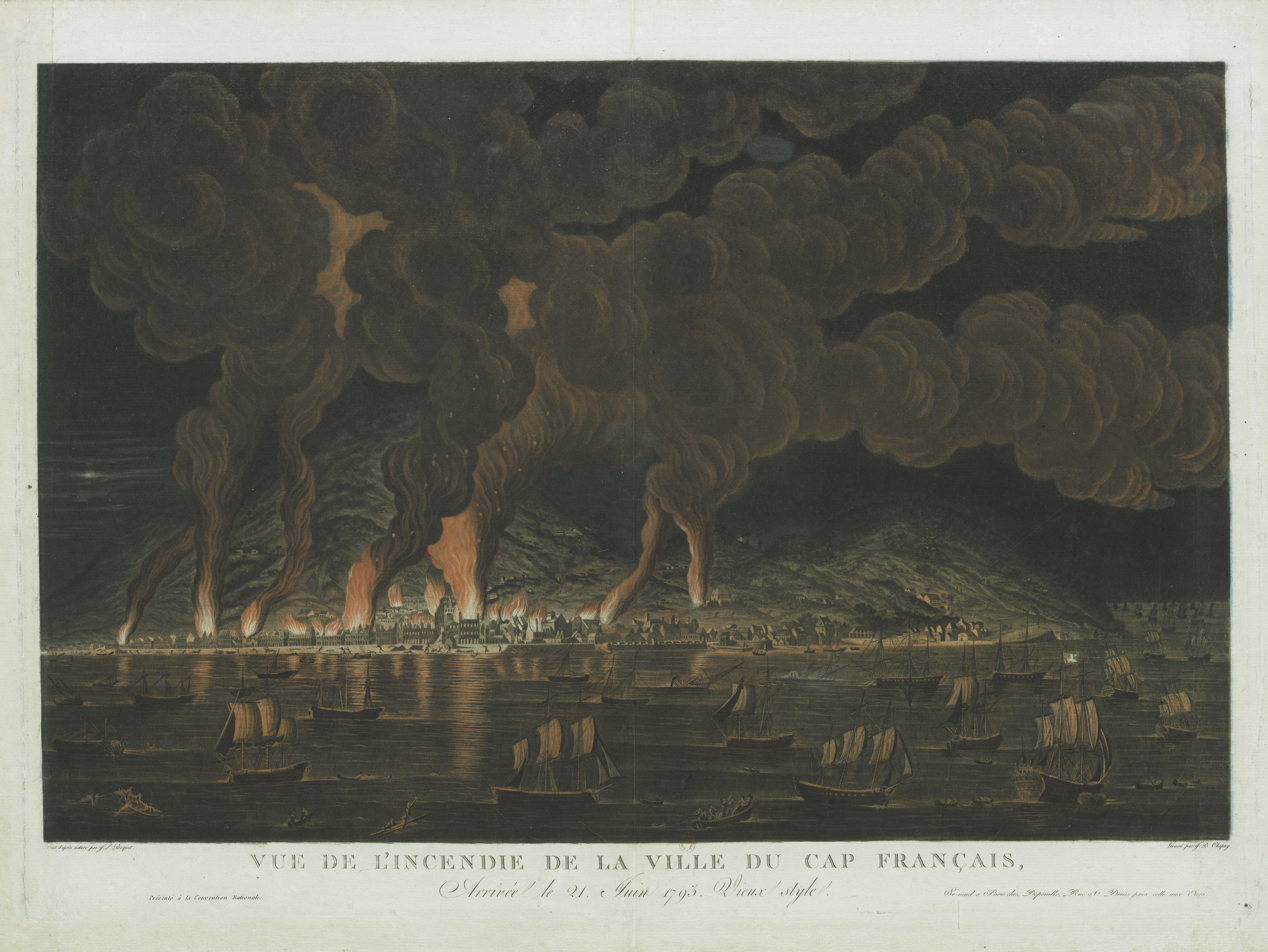
Fire of Cap Français, 21 June 1793

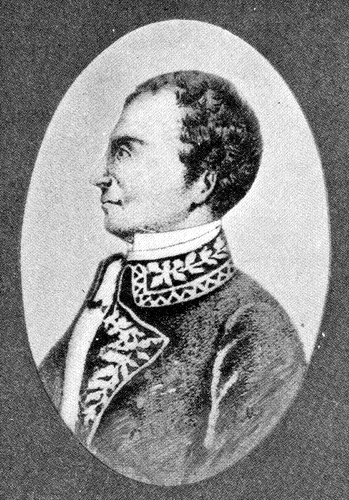
André Rigaud

On 29 August 1793, Sonthonax took the radical step of proclaiming the freedom of the slaves in the north province (with severe limits on their freedom). In September and October, emancipation was extended throughout the colony. The French National Convention, the first elected Assembly of the First Republic (1792–1804), on 4 February 1794, under the leadership of Maximilien de Robespierre, abolished slavery by law in France and all its colonies. The constitution of 1793, which was never applied, and the constitution of 1795, which was put into effect, did both contain an explicit ban on slavery.

The slaves did not immediately flock to Sonthonax's banner, however. Counter-revolutionary planters continued to fight Sonthonax, with support from the British. They were joined by many of the free men of color who opposed the abolition of slavery. It was not until word of France's ratification of emancipation arrived back in the colony that Toussaint Louverture and his corps of well disciplined, battle-hardened former slaves came over to the French Republican side in early May 1794. A change in the political winds in France caused Sonthonax to be recalled in 1796, but not before taking the step of arming the former slaves.

When the radical revolutionaries in Paris declared war against Spain in January 1793, the Spanish Crown sent its forces in Santo Domingo into battle on the side of the slaves. By the end of 1793, Spain controlled most of the north, except British-held Môle-Saint-Nicolas and French-held Le Cap François and Port-de-Paix. In 1795, Spain ceded Santo Domingo to France and Spanish attacks on Saint-Domingue ceased.

In the south, the British suffered a series of defeats at the hands of the mulatto General André Rigaud. On 6 October 1794, Rigaud captured Léogane. On 26 December 1794, he attacked the British-held Tiburon, routing its garrison. In 1798, having lost territory and thousands of men to yellow fever, the British were forced to withdraw.

In the meantime, Rigaud had set up a mulatto separatist movement in the south. In 1799, with the British gone, Toussaint launched an offensive against Rigaud's strongholds. As he sent General Dessalines against Grand and Petit Goâve and General Christophe against the mulatto stronghold of Jacmel, American warships bombarded mulatto fortifications and destroyed Rigaud's transport barges. Rigaud's forces were overwhelmed and defeated in 1800.

By 1801, Toussaint was in control of all of Hispaniola, after conquering French Santo Domingo and proclaiming the abolition of slavery there. He did not, however, proclaim full independence for the country, nor did he seek reprisals against the country's former white slaveholders, convinced that the French would not restore slavery and "that a population of slaves recently landed from Africa could not attain to civilization by 'going it alone.'"

=== Napoleon defeated (1802–1804) ===
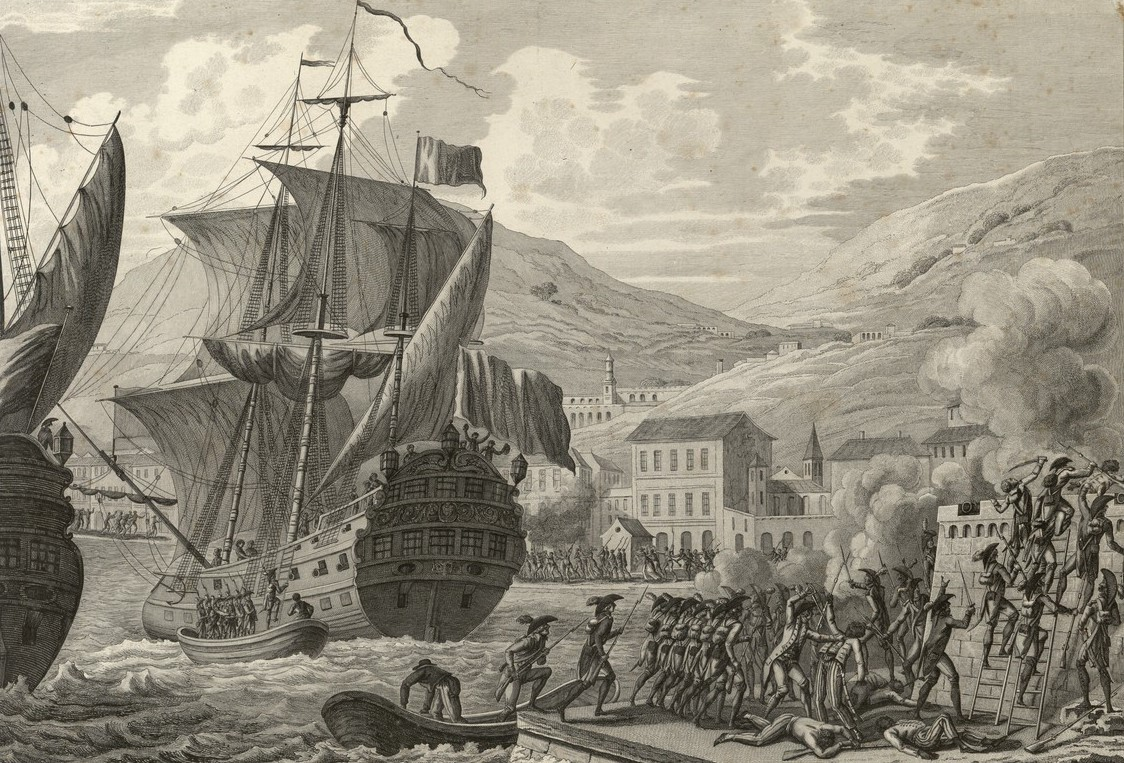
The French army, led by Leclerc, lands in Cap Français (1802).

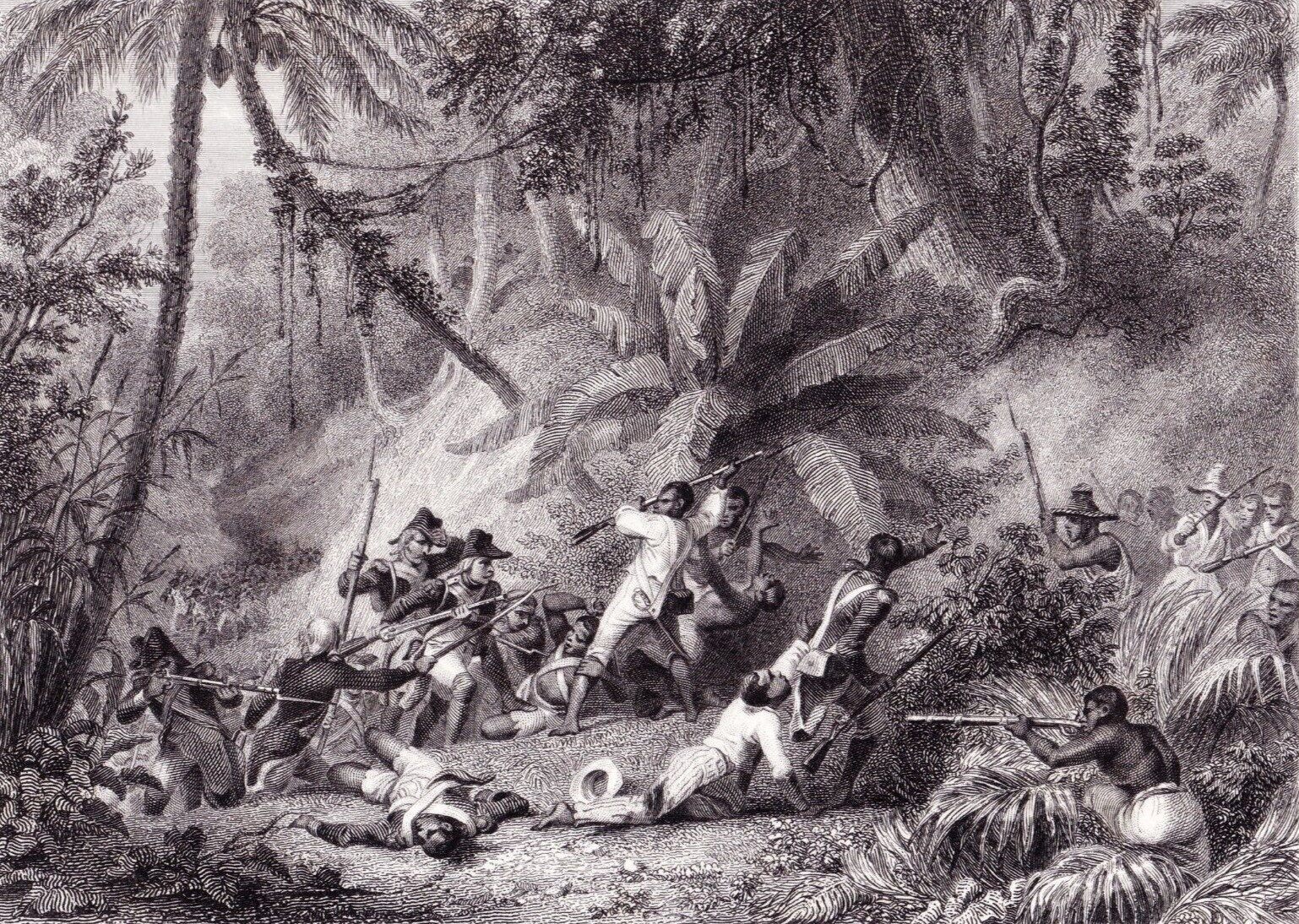
Leclerc's veterans storm Ravine-a-Couleuvre (Snake Gully) in 1802.

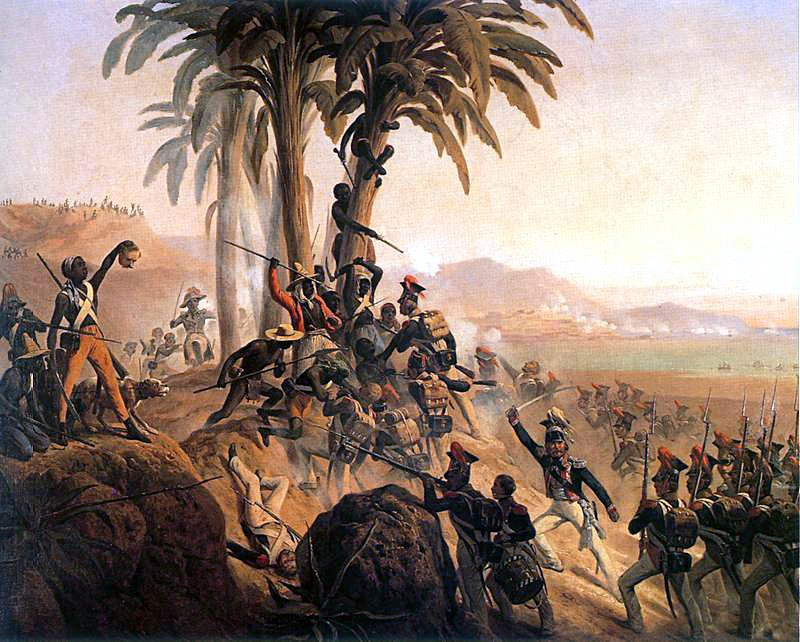
Battle for Santo Domingo, by January Suchodolski (1845)

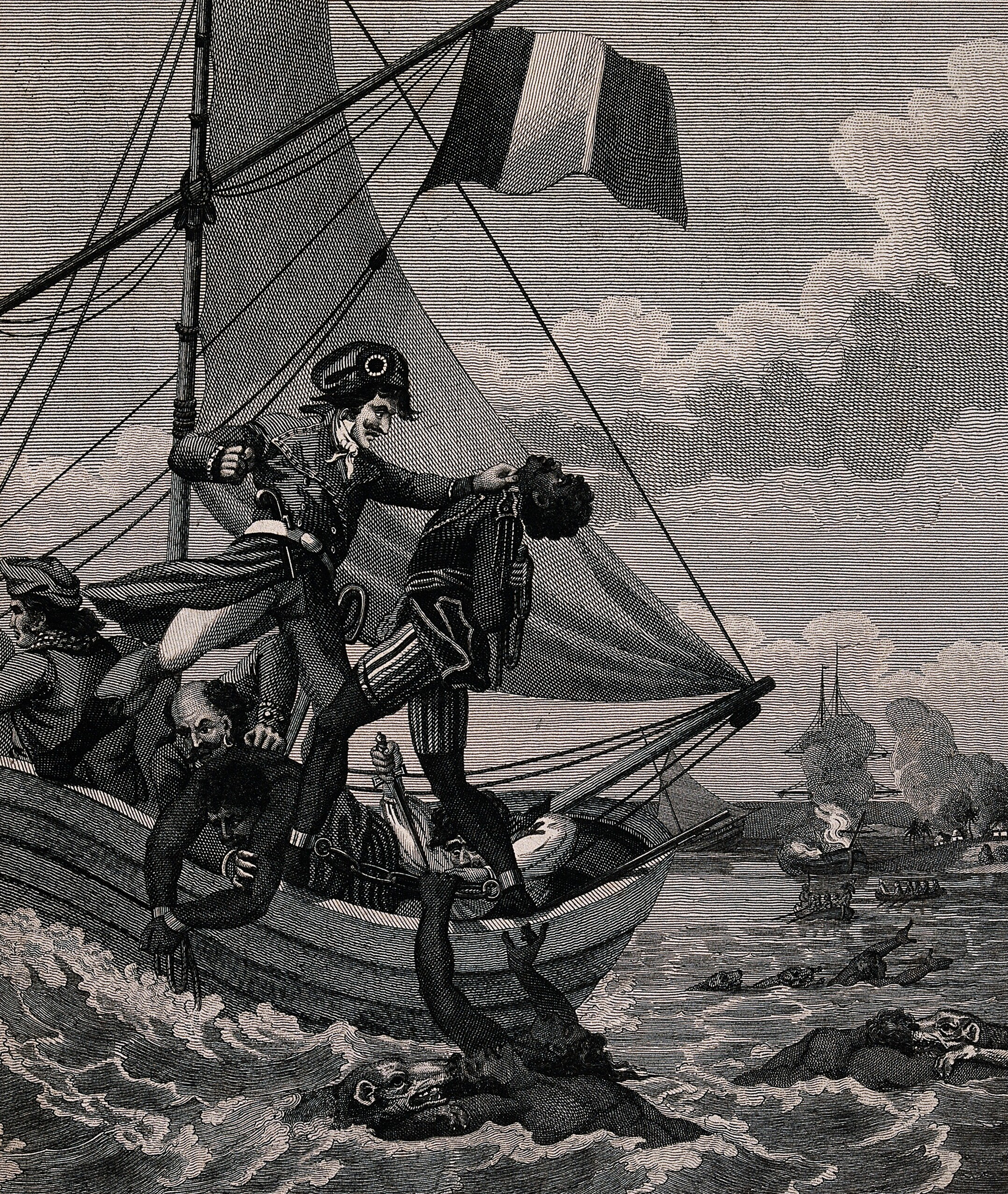
French sailors drowning Black prisoners during the Saint-Domingue expedition

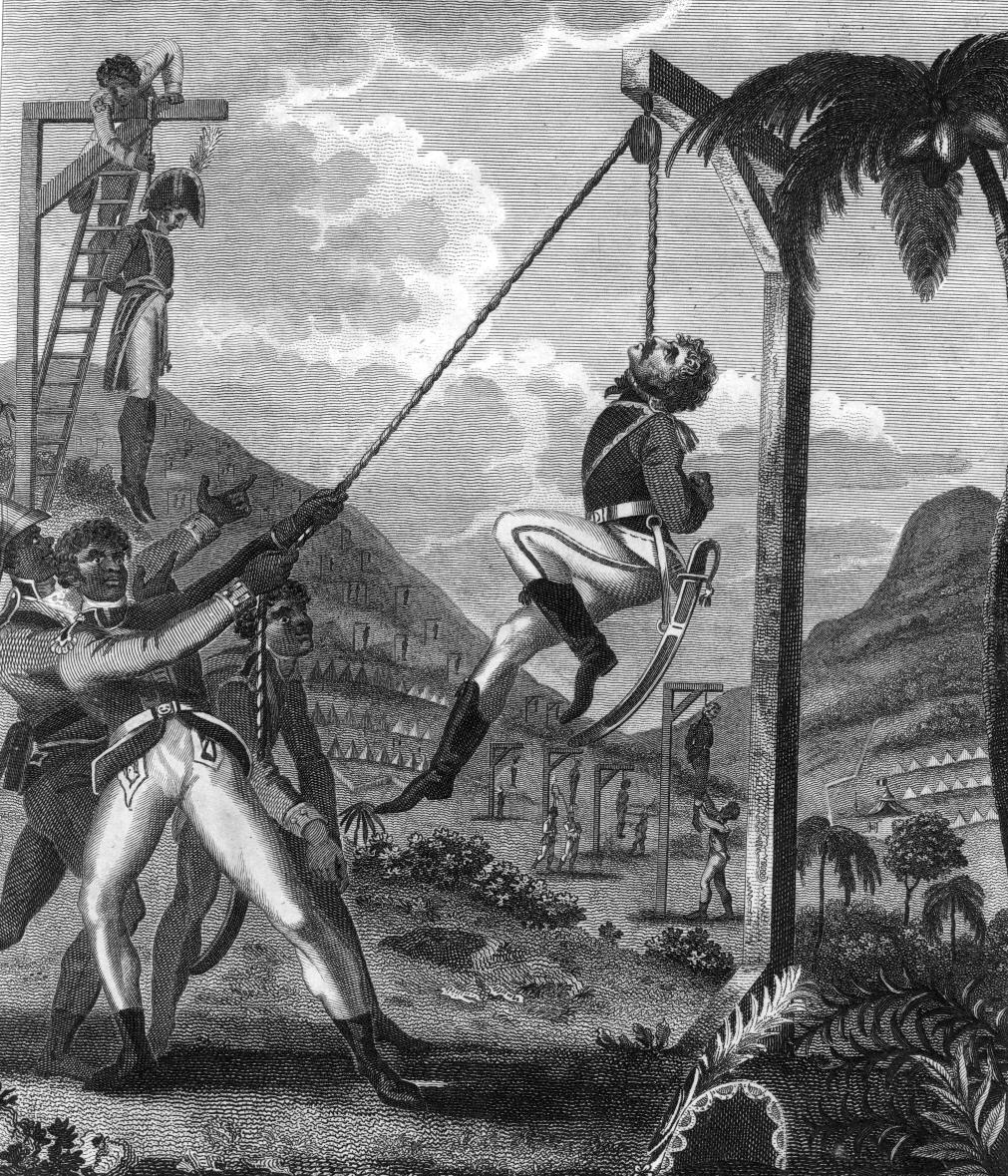
"Revenge taken by the Black Army for the Cruelties practiced on them by the French", by Marcus Rainsford, 1805

Toussaint, however, asserted so much independence that in 1802, Napoleon sent a massive invasion force, under his brother-in-law Charles Leclerc, to increase French control. For a time, Leclerc met with some success; he also brought the eastern part of the island of Hispaniola under the direct control of France in accordance with the terms of the 1795 Treaties of Bâle with Spain. With a large expedition that eventually included 40,000 European troops, and receiving help from white colonists and mulatto forces commanded by Alexandre Pétion, a former lieutenant of Rigaud, the French won several victories after severe fighting. Two of Toussaint's chief lieutenants, Dessalines and Christophe, recognizing their untenable situation, held separate parleys with the invaders and agreed to transfer their allegiance. At this point, Leclerc invited Toussaint to negotiate a settlement. It was a deception; Toussaint was seized and deported to France, where he died in April 1803 of pneumonia, while imprisoned at Fort de Joux in the Jura Mountains.

On 20 May 1802, Napoleon signed a law to maintain slavery where it had not yet disappeared, namely Martinique, Tobago, and Saint Lucia. A confidential copy of this decree was sent to Leclerc, who was authorized by Napoleon to restore slavery in Saint-Domingue when the time was opportune. At the same time, further edicts stripped the gens de couleur of their newly won civil rights. None of these decrees were published or executed in Saint-Domingue, but, by midsummer, word began to reach the colony of the French intention to restore slavery. The betrayal of Toussaint and news of French actions in Martinique undermined the collaboration of leaders such as Dessalines, Christophe, and Pétion. Convinced that the same fate lay in store for Saint-Domingue, these commanders and others once again battled Leclerc. As the French were intent on reconquest and re-enslavement of the colony's black population, the war became a bloody struggle of atrocity and attrition. The rainy season brought yellow fever and malaria, which took a heavy toll on the invaders. By November, when Leclerc died of yellow fever, 24,000 French soldiers were dead and 8,000 were hospitalized, the majority from disease.

Afterward, Leclerc was replaced by Donatien-Marie-Joseph de Vimeur, vicomte de Rochambeau. Rochambeau wrote to Napoleon that, to reclaim Saint-Domingue, France must "declare the negroes slaves, and destroy at least 30,000 negroes and negresses." In his desperation, he turned to increasingly wanton acts of brutality; the French burned alive, hanged, drowned, and tortured black prisoners, reviving such practices as burying blacks in piles of insects and boiling them in cauldrons of molasses. One night, at Port-Républican, he held a ball to which he invited the most prominent mulatto ladies and, at midnight, announced the death of their husbands. However, each act of brutality was repaid by the Haitian rebels. After one battle, Rochambeau buried 500 prisoners alive; Dessalines responded by hanging 500 French prisoners. Rochambeau's brutal tactics helped unite black and mulatto soldiers against the French.

As the tide of the war turned toward the former slaves, Napoleon abandoned his dreams of restoring France's New World empire. In 1803, war resumed between France and Britain, and with the Royal Navy firmly in control of the seas, reinforcements and supplies for Rochambeau never arrived in sufficient numbers. To concentrate on the war in Europe, Napoleon signed the Louisiana Purchase in April, selling France's North American possessions to the United States. The Haitian army, now led by Dessalines, devastated Rochambeau and the French army at the Battle of Vertières on 18 November 1803.

On 1 January 1804 Dessalines then declared independence, reclaiming the indigenous Taíno name of Haiti ("Land of Mountains") for the new sovereign state. Most of the remaining French colonists fled ahead of the defeated French army, many migrating to Louisiana or Cuba. Unlike Toussaint, Dessalines showed little equanimity with regard to the whites. In a final act of retribution, the remaining French were slaughtered by Haitian military forces in a white genocide. Some 2,000 Frenchmen were massacred at Cap-Français, 900 in Port-au-Prince, and 400 at Jérémie. He issued a proclamation declaring, "we have repaid these cannibals, war for war, crime for crime, outrage for outrage."

One exception to Dessalines' proclamation was a group of Poles from the Polish Legions that had joined the French military under Napoleon. A majority of Polish soldiers refused to fight against the Haitian forces. At the time, there was a familiar situation going on back in their homeland, as these Polish soldiers were fighting for their liberty from the invading Russians, Prussians and Austrians that began in 1772. As hopeful as the Haitians, many Poles were seeking union amongst themselves to win back their homeland. As a result, many Polish soldiers admired their enemy and decided to turn on the French army and join the Haitian former slaves, and participated in the Haitian revolution of 1804, supporting the principles of liberty for all the people. Władysław Franciszek Jabłonowski, who was half Black, was one of the Polish generals at the time. Polish soldiers had a remarkable input in helping the Haitians in their retaliation against the French oppressor. They were spared the fate of other Europeans. For their loyalty and support for overthrowing the French, some Poles acquired Haitian citizenship after Haiti gained its independence, and many of them settled there, never to return to Poland. It is estimated that around 500 of the 5,280 Poles chose this option. Of the remainder, 700 returned to France to eventually return to Poland, and some, after capitulating, agreed to serve in the British Army. 160 Poles were later given permission to leave Haiti and some were sent to France at Haitian expense. To this day, many Polish Haitians still live in Haiti and are of multiracial descent; some have blonde hair, light eyes, and other European features. Today, descendants of those Poles who stayed are living in Cazale, Fond-des-Blancs, La Vallée-de-Jacmel, La Baleine, Port-Salut and Saint-Jean-du-Sud.

Following Haitian independence, the new independent state struggled economically, as European countries and the United States refused to extend diplomatic recognition to Haiti. In 1825, the French returned with a fleet of fourteen warships and demanded an indemnity of 150 million francs in exchange for diplomatic recognition; Haitian President Jean-Pierre Boyer agreed to the French demands under duress. In order to finance the debt, the Haitian government was forced to take numerous high-interest loans from foreign creditors, and the debt to France was not fully paid until 1947.

== Independence: The early years (1804–1843) ==
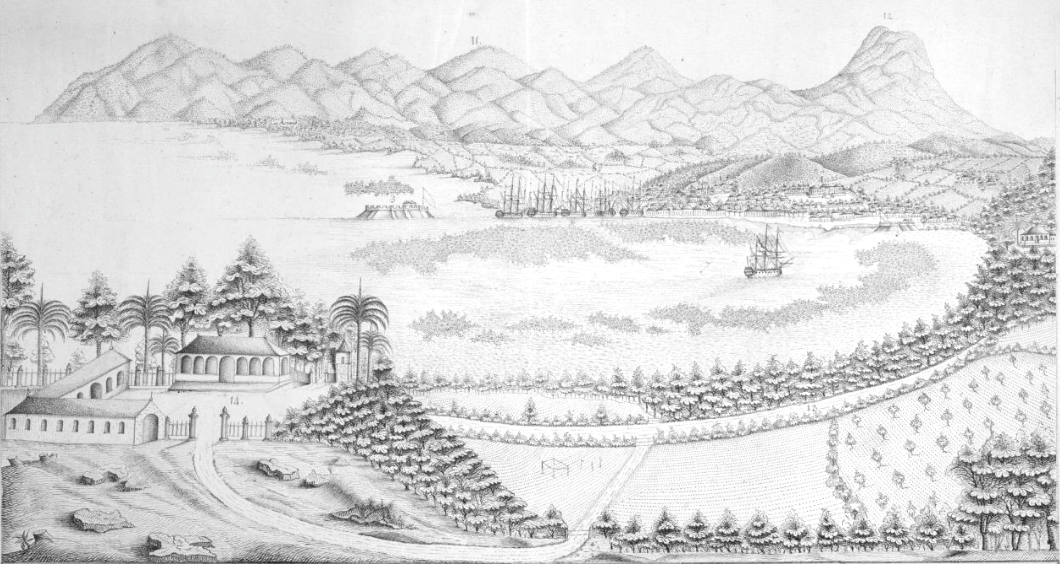
Port-au-Prince and surroundings at the start of the 19th century

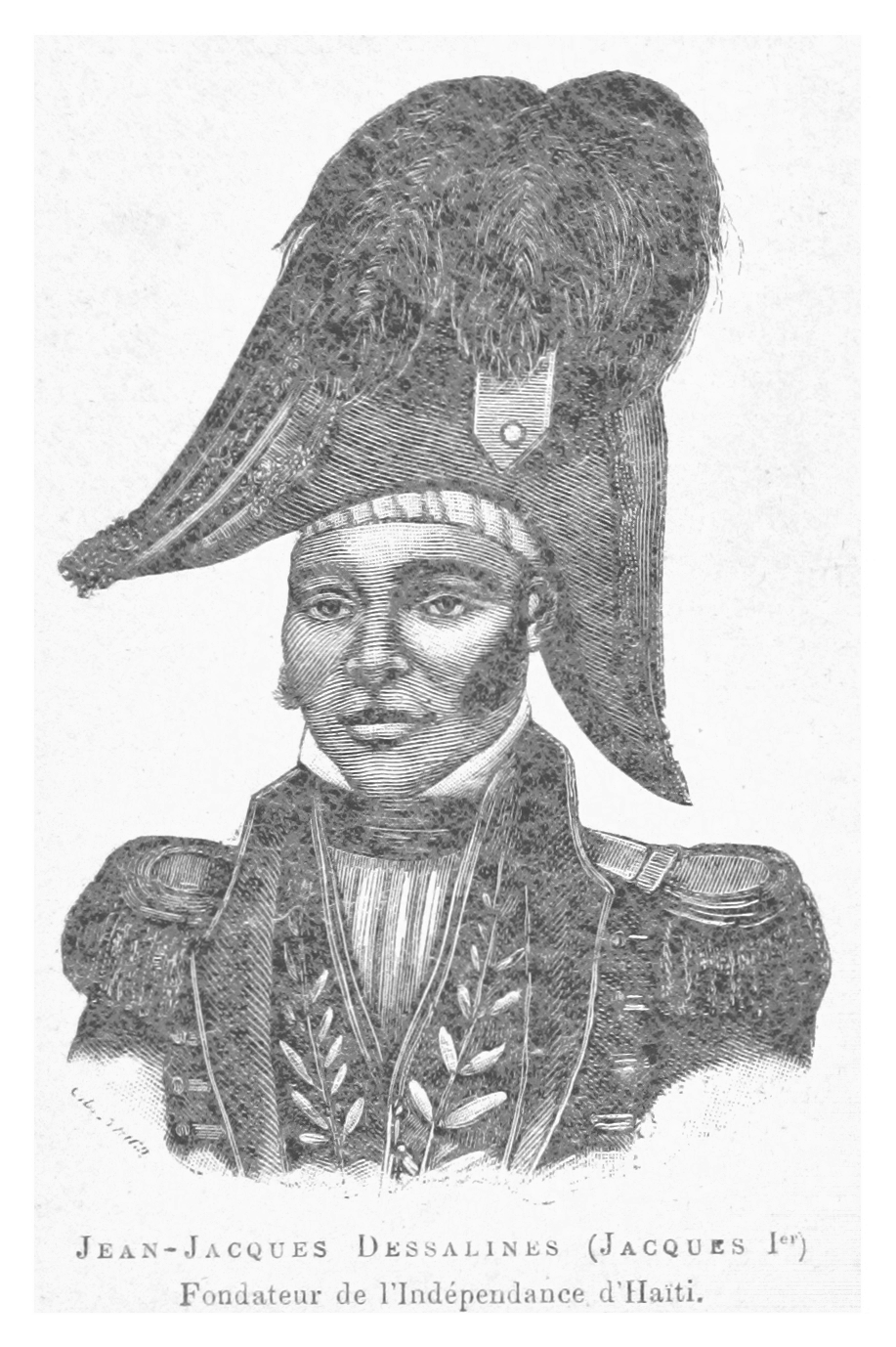
Jean-Jacques Dessalines

=== Black Republic (1804) ===
Haiti became the second state in the Americas after the United States to gain independence from a European colonial power. Haiti actively assisted the independence movements of many Latin American countries – and secured a promise from the great liberator, Simón Bolívar, that he would free slaves after winning independence from Spain. The country inhabited mostly by former slaves remained excluded from the hemisphere's first regional meeting of independent states, held in Panama in 1826, largely due to the atrocities of the 1804 Haitian Genocide, which targeted European men, women and children who resided in Haiti, including those who were favorable to the revolution. Despite the efforts of anti-slavery senator Charles Sumner of Massachusetts, the United States did not recognize the independence of Haiti until 1862. The Southern slave states held a majority in Congress and, afraid of encouraging slave revolts, blocked this; Haiti was quickly recognized (along with other progressive measures, such as ending slavery in the District of Columbia), after these legislators left Washington in 1861, their states having declared their secession.

Upon assuming power, General Dessalines authorized the Constitution of 1804. This constitution, in terms of social freedoms, called for:

1. Freedom of religion. (Under Toussaint, Catholicism had been declared the official state religion.)
2. All citizens of Haiti, regardless of skin color, to be known as "Black" (this was an attempt to eliminate the multi-tiered racial hierarchy that had developed in Haiti, with full or near full-blooded Europeans at the top, various levels of light to brown skin in the middle, and dark skinned "Kongo" from Africa at the bottom).
3. White men were forbidden from possessing property or land on Haitian soil. Should the French return to reimpose slavery, Article 5 of the constitution declared: "At the first shot of the warning gun, the towns shall be destroyed and the nation will rise in arms."

=== First Haitian Empire (1804–1806) ===
On 1 January 1804, Dessalines proclaimed Haiti an independent sovereign state. Mid-February, Dessalines told some cities (Léogâne, Jacmel, Les Cayes) to prepare for mass massacres. On 22 February 1804, he signed a decree ordering that all whites in all cities should be put to death. The weapons used should be silent weapons such as knives and bayonets rather than gunfire, so that the killing could be done more quietly, and avoid warning intended victims by the sound of gunfire and thereby giving them the opportunity to escape.

On 22 September 1804, Dessalines proclaimed himself Emperor Jacques I. Yet two of his own advisers, Henri Christophe and Alexandre Pétion, helped bring about his assassination in 1806. The conspirators ambushed him north of Port-au-Prince at Pont Larnage (now known as Pont-Rouge) on 17 October 1806 en route to battle rebels to his regime.

The state created under Dessalines was the opposite of what the Haitian lower class wanted. While both the elite leaders, such as Dessalines, and the Haitian population agreed the state should be built on the ideals of freedom and democracy, these ideals in practice looked very different for the two groups. The main reason for this difference in viewpoints of nationalisms come from the fact that one group lived as slaves, and the other did not. For one, the economic and agricultural practices of Dessalines, and leaders after him, were based on the need to create a strong economic state, that was capable of maintaining a strong military. For the elite leaders of Haiti, maintaining a strong military to ward off either the French or other colonial powers and ensure independence would secure a free state. The leaders of Haiti saw independence from other powers as their notion of freedom.

However, the Haitian peasantry tied their notion of freedom to the land. Because of the mountainous terrain, Haitian slaves were able to cultivate their own small tracts of land. Thus, freedom for them was the ability to cultivate their own land within a subsistence economy. Unfortunately, because of the leaders' desires, a system of coerced plantation agriculture emerged. Furthermore, while all Haitians desired a black republic, the cultural practices of African Americans were a point of contention. Many within the Haitian population wanted to maintain their African heritage, which they saw as a logical part of the black republic they wanted. However, the elites typically tried to prove the sophistication of Haitians through literature. Some authors wrote that the barbarism of Africa must be expelled, while maintaining African roots.

Furthermore, other authors tried to prove the civility of the elite Haitians by arguing that Blacks were capable of establishing and running a government by changing and augmenting the history of the revolution to favor the mulatto and black elites, rather than the bands of slaves. Furthermore, to maintain freedom and independence, the elites failed to provide the civil society that the Haitian mass desired. The Haitian peasants desired not only land freedom but also civil rights, such as voting and political participation, as well as access to education. The state failed to provide those basic rights.

The state was essentially run by the military, which meant that it was very difficult for the Haitian population to participate in any democratic process. Most importantly, the state failed to provide the access to education that a state of former slaves needed. It was nearly impossible for the former slaves to participate effectively because they lacked the basic literacy that had been intentionally denied to them under French colonial rule. Through their differing views on Haitian nationalism and freedom, the elites created a state that greatly favored them, instead of the Haitian peasantry.

=== Struggle for unity (1806–1820) ===
After the Dessalines coup d'état, the two main conspirators divided the country in two rival regimes. Christophe created the authoritarian State of Haiti in the north, and the gens de couleur Pétion established the Republic of Haiti in the south. Christophe attempted to maintain a strict system of labor and agricultural production akin to the former plantations. Although, strictly speaking, he did not establish slavery, he imposed a semi-feudal system, fumage, in which every able man was required to work in plantations (similar to Spanish latifundios) to produce goods for the fledgling country. His method, though undoubtedly oppressive, produced the greater revenues of the two governments.

In contrast, Pétion broke up the former colonial estates and parceled out the land into small holdings. In Pétion's south, the gens de couleur minority led the government and feared losing popular support, and thus, they reduced class tensions by land redistribution. Because of the weak international position and its labor policies (most peasants lived through a subsistence economy), Pétion's government was perpetually on the brink of bankruptcy. Yet, for most of its time, it produced one of the most liberal and tolerant Haitian governments ever. In 1815, at a key period of Bolívar's fight for Venezuelan independence, Pétion gave the Venezuelan leader asylum and provided him soldiers and substantial material support. Pétion also had the fewest internal military skirmishes, despite his continuous conflicts with Christophe's northern kingdom. In 1816, however, after finding the burden of the Senate intolerable, he suspended the legislature and turned his post into President for Life. Not long after, he died of yellow fever, and his assistant Jean-Pierre Boyer replaced him.

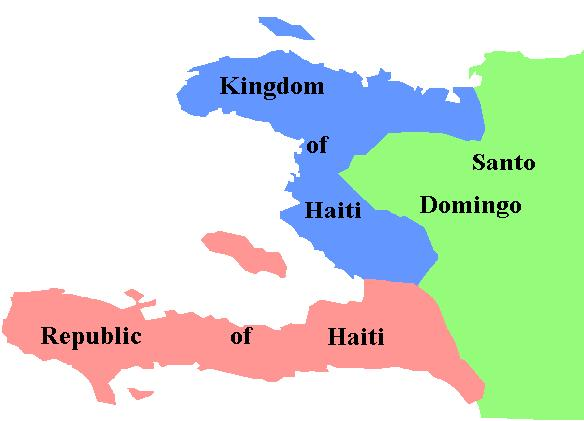
The Kingdom of Haiti in the North and the Republic of Haiti in the South

In this period, the eastern part of the island rose against the new powers, following general Juan Sánchez Ramírez's claims of independence from France, which broke the Treaties of Bâle attacking Spain and prohibited commerce with Haiti. In the Palo Hincado battle (7 November 1808), all the remaining French forces were defeated by Spanish-creole insurrectionists. On 9 July 1809, the Spanish colony Santo Domingo was born. The government put itself under the control of Spain, earning it the nickname of "España Boba" (meaning "The Idiot Spain").

In 1811, Henri Christophe proclaimed himself King Henri I of the Kingdom of Haiti in the North and commissioned several extraordinary buildings. He even created a nobility class in the fashion of European monarchies. Yet in 1820, weakened by illness and with decreasing support for his authoritarian regime, he killed himself with a silver bullet rather than face a coup d'état. Immediately after, Pétion's successor, Boyer, reunited Haiti through diplomatic tactics and ruled as president until his overthrow in 1843.

=== Boyer's domination of Hispaniola (1820–1843) ===
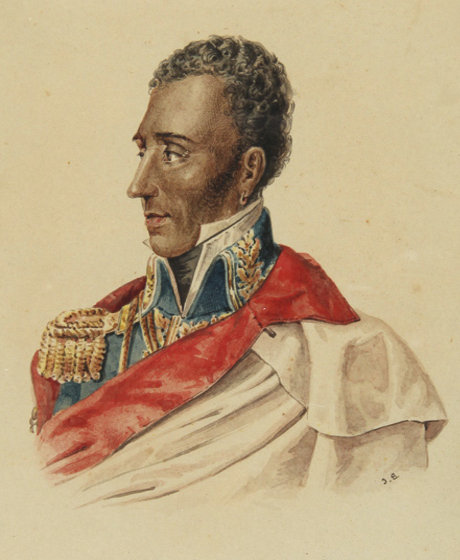
Jean-Pierre Boyer

Almost two years after Boyer had consolidated power in the west, Haiti invaded Santo Domingo (present-day Dominican Republic) and declared the island free from European powers. Boyer, however, responding to a faction in the east that preferred a union with Haiti over the existing one which would be with Gran Colombia, occupied the ex-Spanish colony in January 1822, encountering no military resistance. In this way he accomplished the unity of the island, which was only carried out for a short period of time by Toussaint Louverture in 1801. Boyer's occupation of the Spanish side also responded to internal struggles among Christophe's generals, to which Boyer gave extensive powers and lands in the east. This occupation, however, pitted the white Spanish elite against the iron-fisted Haitian administration, which stimulated the emigration of many wealthy white families. The entire island remained under Haitian rule until 1844, when in the east a nationalist group called La Trinitaria led a revolt that partitioned the island into Haiti on the west and Dominican Republic on the east, based on what would appear to be a riverine territorial 'divide' from the pre-contact period.

From 1824 to 1826, while the island was under one government, Boyer promoted the largest single free-Black immigration from the United States in which more than 6,000 immigrants settled in different parts of the island. Today remnants of these immigrants live throughout the island, but the larger number reside in Samaná, a peninsula on the Dominican side of the island. From the government's perspective, the intention of the immigration was to help establish commercial and diplomatic relationships with the US, and to increase the number of skilled and agricultural workers in Haiti.

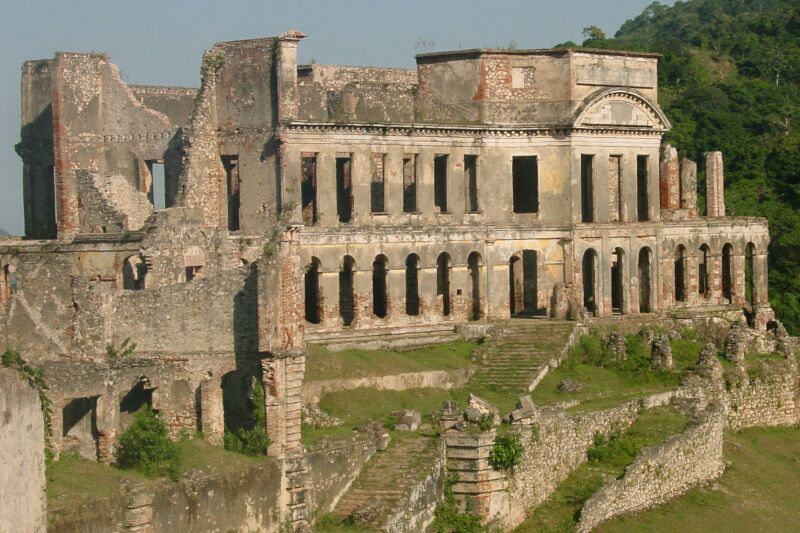
The ruins of the Sans-Souci Palace, severely damaged in the 1842 earthquake and never rebuilt

In exchange for diplomatic recognition from France, Boyer was forced to pay a huge indemnity for the loss of French property during the revolution. To pay for this, he had to float loans in France, putting Haiti into a state of debt. Boyer attempted to enforce production through the Code Rural, enacted in 1826, but peasant freeholders, mostly former revolutionary soldiers, had no intention of returning to the forced labor they fought to escape. By 1840, Haiti had ceased to export sugar entirely, although large amounts continued to be grown for local consumption as taffia-a raw rum. However, Haiti continued to export coffee, which required little cultivation and grew semi-wild.

The 1842 Cap-Haïtien earthquake destroyed the city of Cap-Haïtien and the Sans-Souci Palace, killing about 5,000 people – roughly half the town's inhabitants – with some 300 more drowned by the tsunami that followed. This was the third major earthquake to hit Western Hispaniola following the 1751 and 1770 Port-au-Prince earthquakes, and the last until the devastating earthquake of 2010.

== Political struggles (1843–1915) ==
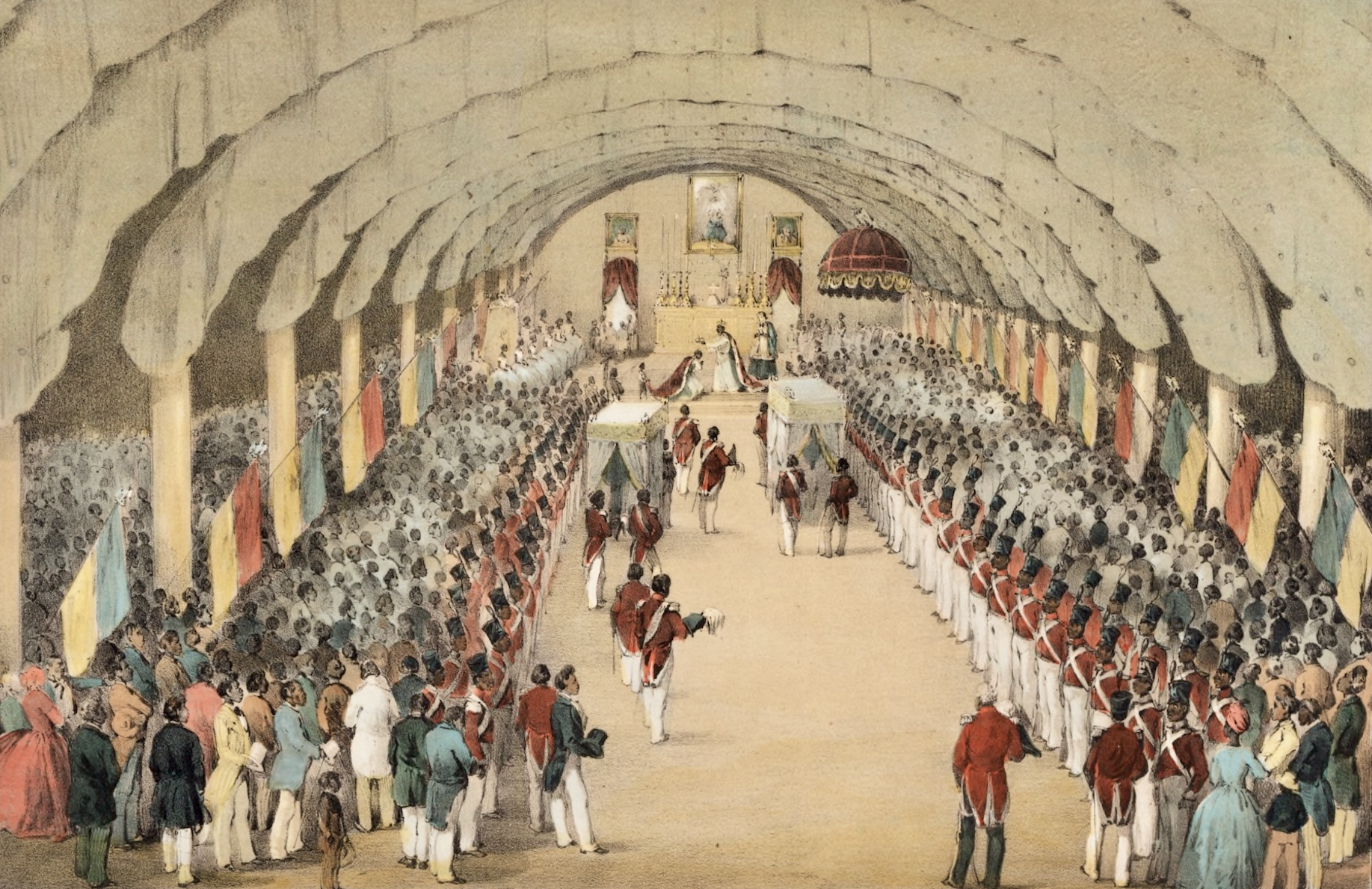
The coronation of Faustin I of Haiti in 1849

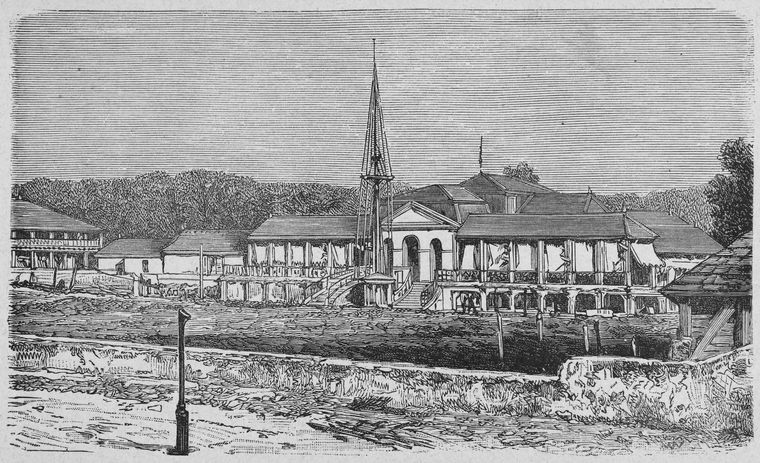
The National Palace burned down during the revolt against Salnave in 1868

In 1843, a revolt, led by Charles Rivière-Hérard, overthrew Boyer and established a brief parliamentary rule under the Constitution of 1843. Revolts soon broke out and the country descended into near chaos, with a series of transient presidents until March 1847, when General Faustin Soulouque, a former slave who had fought in the rebellion of 1791, became president. During this period, Haiti unsuccessfully waged war against the Dominican Republic.

In 1849, taking advantage of his popularity, President Faustin Soulouque proclaimed himself Emperor Faustin I. His iron rule succeeded in uniting Haiti for a time, but it came to an abrupt end in 1859 when he was deposed by General Fabre Geffrard, styled the Duke of Tabara.

Fabre Geffrard remained in power until 1867 and successfully promoted a policy of national reconciliation. His achievements included signing a concordat with the Vatican in 1860 and restoring Roman Catholic influence in Haiti, including within the education system.

In 1867, Sylvain Salnave overthrew Geffrard and assumed the presidency. Initially popular, he soon alienated many through his authoritarian tendencies; these included dissolving the National Assembly and annulling the constitution. His heavy-handed rule sparked widespread discontent, which was exploited by Generals Jean-Nicolas Nissage Saget and Michel Domingue to lead a rebellion. As defeat loomed, Salnave fled for the Dominican Republic; however, his escape attempt was thwarted by Dominican border guards, who extradited him back to Haiti. He was tried for incendiarism and murder and was executed on January 15, 1870. Saget succeeded him as the next president of Haiti.

From the 1870s to the 1890s, Haitian politics would be defined by two major political parties: the Liberal Party (PL), representing the mulatto elite, and the National Party (PN), dominated by the black majority.

In 1874, Saget peacefully transferred power to National-aligned Michel Domingue, marking one of the few times a Haitian head of state served his prescribed term and then retired. Many viewed him to be a figurehead; real power laid with his nephew, Septimus Rameau, founder of the National Party.

In 1876, Domingue was overthrown by the Liberals and succeeded by Pierre Théoma Boisrond-Canal. For the remainder of the decade, the Liberals became increasingly factionalized between the "Canalistes" who supported President Canal and the "Bazelaisistes" who supported Jean Pierre Boyer-Bazelais, one of the party founders. This infighting severely weakened the Liberals and costed them the 1879 elections, bringing National Party candidate, Lysius Salomon, to the presidency.

During his presidency, Salomon enacted monetary reform, and, in 1880–1881, established the National Bank of Haiti (Banque Nationale). His presidency also saw a cultural renaissance, with Haitian art flourishing during this period. However, Salomon's efforts to prolong his tenure by amending the constitution sparked fears this would lead to a presidency-for-life, leading to significant oppositions and calls for his resignation. Facing immense pressure, Salomon ultimately resigned.

The nation then descended into civil war; stability was eventually restored under Florvil Hyppolite, who reunified Haiti and ushered in a rare period of peace. Hyppolite appointed Anténor Firmin as Minister of Finance, who reformed the country's financial systems. Firmin reorganized the banks, taxation, and regularized debt payments to France, stabilizing Haiti's reputation as a reliable debtor nation. Though initially backed by the Nationals, he had declared himself a Liberal by the time he reached the presidency, making the divisions increasingly blurry and ultimately irrelevant.

Tirésias Simon Sam, who succeeded Hyppolite after his sudden death in March 1896, was able to maintain the peace he had started.

The final decades of the 19th century were also marked by the development of a Haitian intellectual culture. Major works of history were published in 1847 and 1865. Haitian intellectuals, led by Louis-Joseph Janvier and Anténor Firmin, engaged in a war of letters against a tide of racism and Social Darwinism that emerged during this period.

By the 20th century, new political forces had emerged, including the Firminism movement, led by Anténor Firmin. This movement emerged during the political vacuum following the resignation of President Sam after his controversial handling of the Luders Affair. Advocating for economic reform, the reduction of military influence in politics, the broader inclusion of civilian participation in governance, and a third-way that transcended the traditional Liberal and National divide, Firminism quickly gained momentum. As the elections to elect a new president approached, Firmin and General Pierre Nord Alexis emerged as the primary contenders. Those supporting Firmin were called the "Firministes" while those who supported Alexis were called the "Nordistes".

Between June and December 1902, Haiti was engulfed in civil war between these two factions. However, Firmin's movement lacked the necessary military strength to succeed; it was ultimately crushed. Firmin was forced into exile once more and General Alexis was declared president of Haiti on December 17, 1902. There was a subsequent Firminist rebellion in 1908, but that too was crushed by Alexis.

However, by 1908, Alexis' rule had become tenuous. Amid mounting discontent over famines and natural disasters, General Antoine Simon launched a rebellion against Alexis, eventually driving him to exile later that year. He departed for Kingston, Jamaica, to jeering crowds. Overjoyed by the news, Firmin's supporters chartered a ship to return to Haiti. However, Firmin himself delayed the journey, waiting for a larger vessel to accommodate his followers and their families - a hesitation that cost him the chance to claim power.

On December 8, Antoine Simon declared himself president of Haiti after entering Port-au-Prince. Simon aligned his regime with US interests to consolidate power. Firminists in exile published scathing tracts against the government, criticizing him for compromising Haitian sovereignty and independence. One from 1910 accused Simon of “selling the country whole to the Americans” and forewarning that under U.S. domination, “independent Haitians would return to being slaves.”

In 1911, General Cincinnatus Leconte capitalized on border tensions with the Dominican Republic to lead a rebellion and launch his own bid for power, managing to rally some of Firmin's supporters towards his cause. In retaliation, Simon directed a full-scale military assault on Ouanaminthe, the rebellious eastern border town where Leconte had gathered his forces. The attack resulted in the town being burned down and the townsfolk being terrorized.

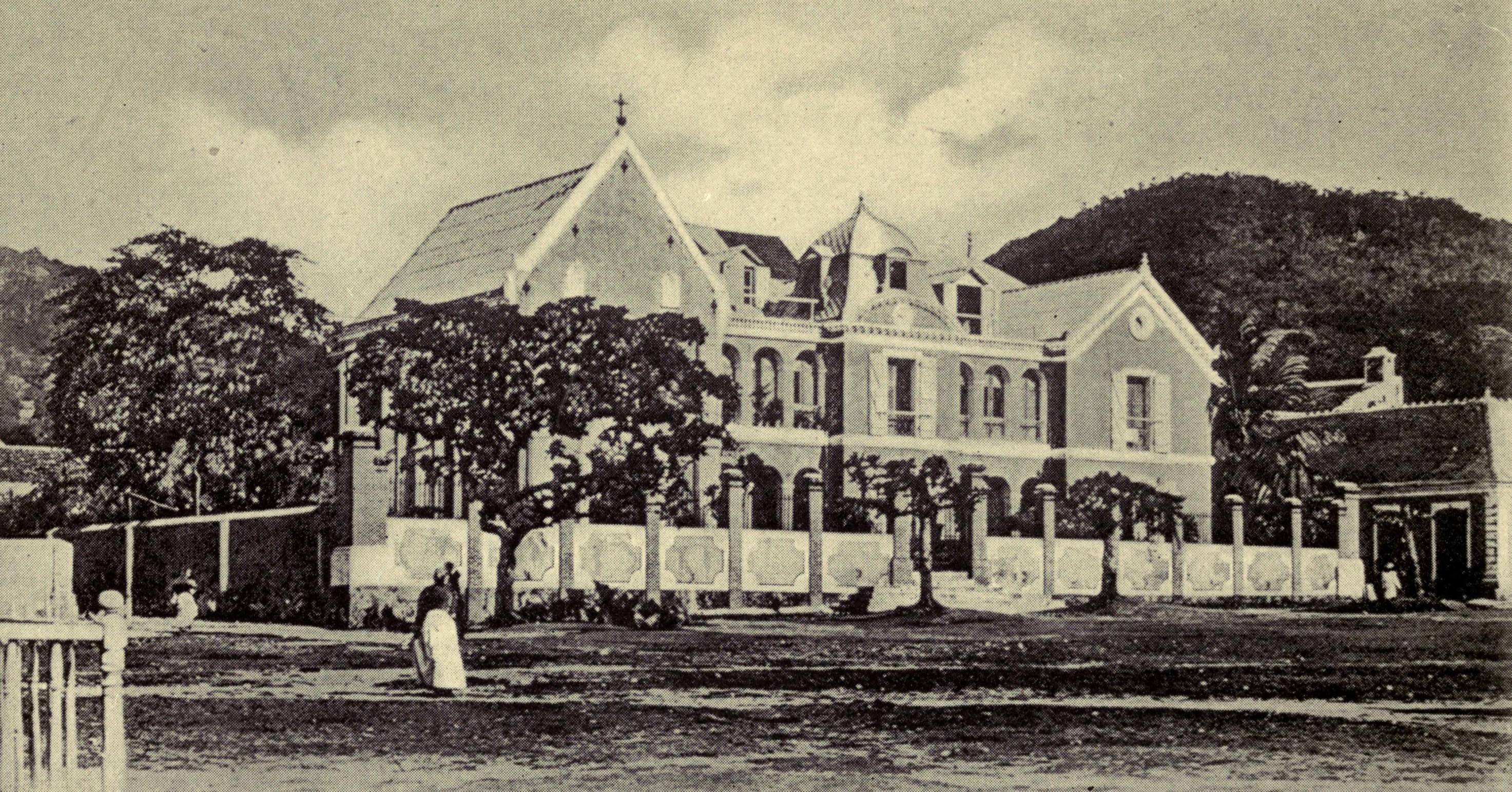
Bishop's House in Cap-Haitien, 1907

Though both Firmin and Leconte were opposed to Antoine Simon's government, their political ambitions diverged, making them rivals rather than allies. The rivalry between the two factions extended to Cap-Haïtien, where their partisans clashed.

While Simon and his ministers focused on quelling the rebellion, generals remaining in Port-au-Prince seized the opportunity to exact revenge on their political enemies and settle scores, with supporters of Firmin being summarily executed on charges of conspiracy.

On August 3, Simon fled into exile. Three days later on August 6, Leconte's forces triumphantly entered Port-au-Prince and established control. Firmin arrived a day later on August 7 in Cap-Haïtien aboard a French steamer, the Caravelle, but his delayed landing weakened his negotiating position. Leconte immediately blocked his entry into the country, denying him the chance to assert his leadership. This denial was a humiliating blow for Firmin, and it dashed the hopes of his supporters for a potential Firmin presidency once more.

On August 8, Firmin publicly declared his retirement from politics, officially withdrawing his candidacy for the presidency and renouncing any public office, both in Haiti and abroad. In a personal farewell letter, Firmin expressed deep disappointment, lamenting that Haiti had rejected his vision of national unity and progress. This marked the end of his political dreams for Haiti. He returned to St. Thomas, where he spent the remainder of his days. Firmin died on 27 September 1911 in St. Thomas.

From 1911 to 1915, there were six different presidents, each of whom was killed or forced into exile. The revolutionary armies were formed by cacos, peasant brigands from the mountains of the north, along the porous Dominican border, who were enlisted by rival political factions with promises of money to be paid after a successful revolution and an opportunity to plunder.

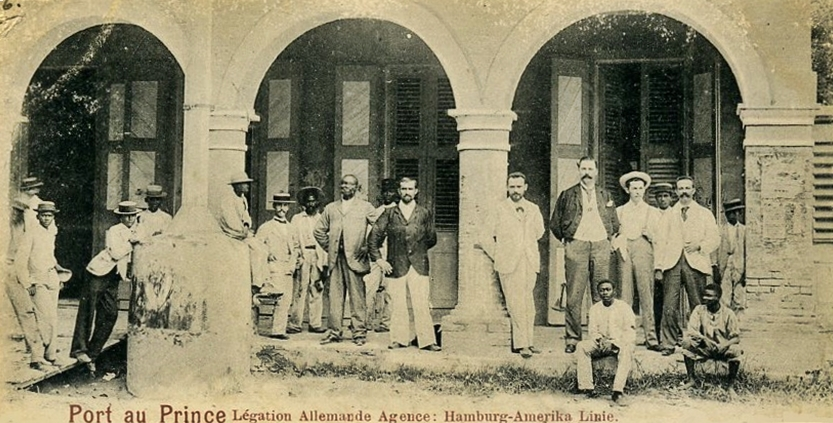
Staff of the German legation and the Hamburg-Amerika Line agency at Port-au-Prince, Haiti in 1900. The agency was involved in the staffing and management of the legation. German nationals were comparatively numerous in Haiti and heavily involved in the Haitian economy until World War I.

The United States was particularly apprehensive about the role of the German community in Haiti (approximately 200 in 1910), who wielded a disproportionate amount of economic power. Germans controlled about 80% of the country's international commerce; they also owned and operated utilities in Cap Haïtien and Port-au-Prince, the main wharf and a tramway in the capital, and a railroad serving the Plaine de Cul-du-Sac.

The German community proved more willing to integrate into Haitian society than any other group of white foreigners, including the French. A number married into the nation's most prominent mulatto families, bypassing the constitutional prohibition against foreign land-ownership. They also served as the principal financiers of the nation's innumerable revolutions, floating innumerable loans – at high interest rates – to competing political factions.

In an effort to limit German influence, in 1910–1911, the US State Department backed a consortium of American investors, assembled by the National City Bank of New York, in securing the currency issuance concession through the National Bank of the Republic of Haiti, which replaced the prior National Bank of Haiti as the nation's only commercial bank and custodian of the government treasury.

In February 1915, Vilbrun Guillaume Sam established a dictatorship, but in July, facing a new revolt, he massacred 167 political prisoners, all of whom were from elite families, and was lynched by a mob in Port-au-Prince.

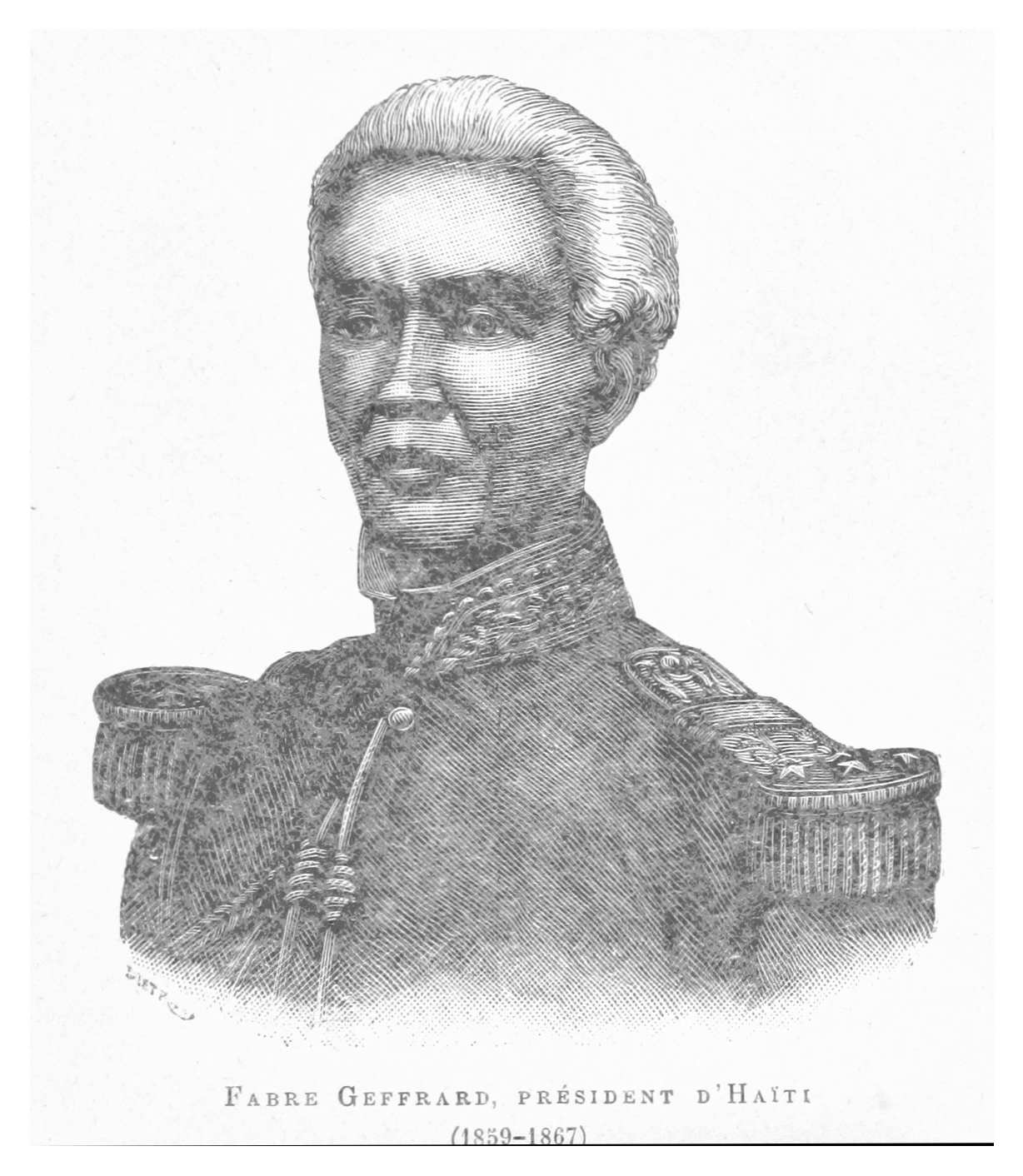
Fabre Geffrard

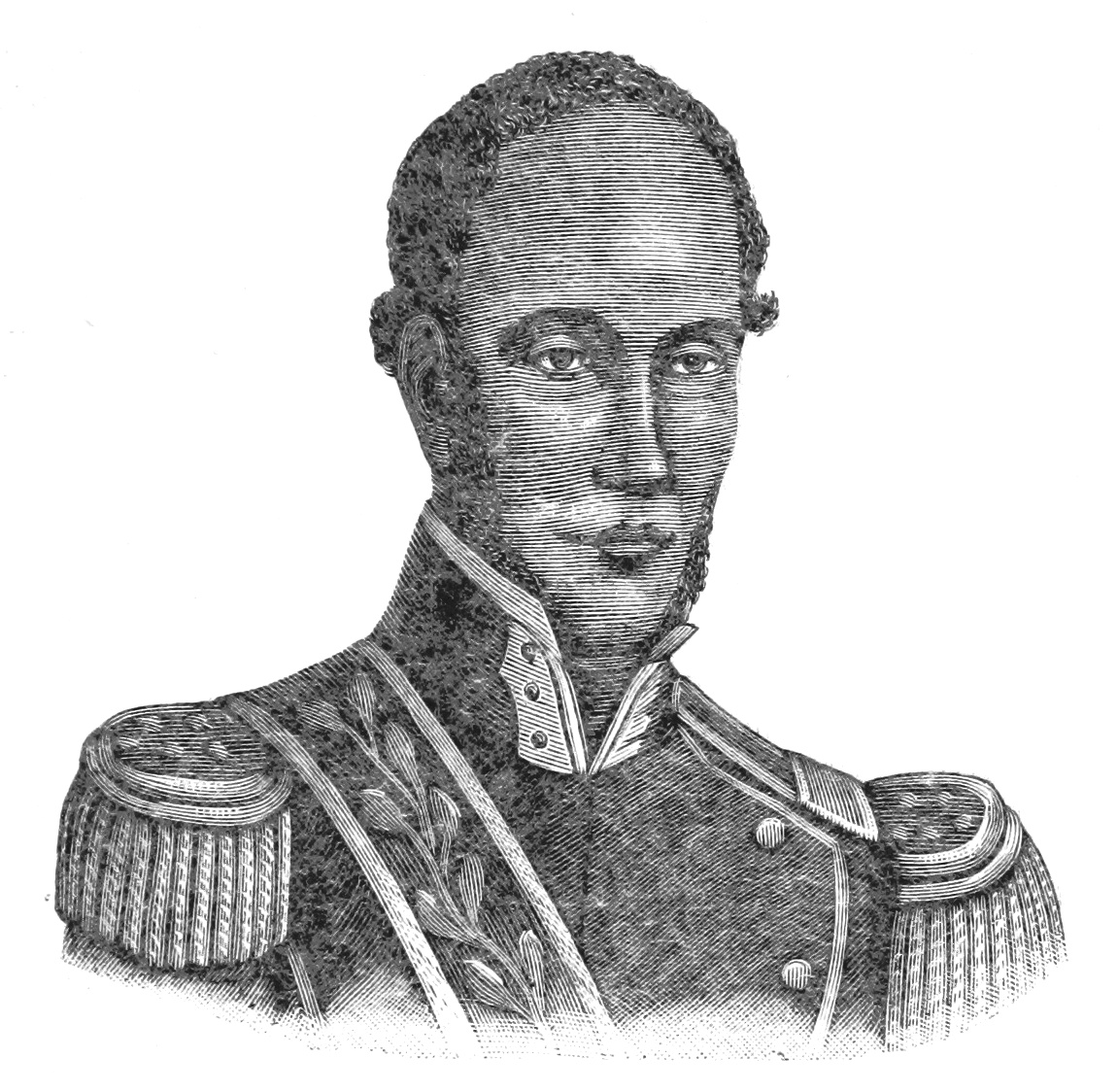
Charles Rivière-Hérard

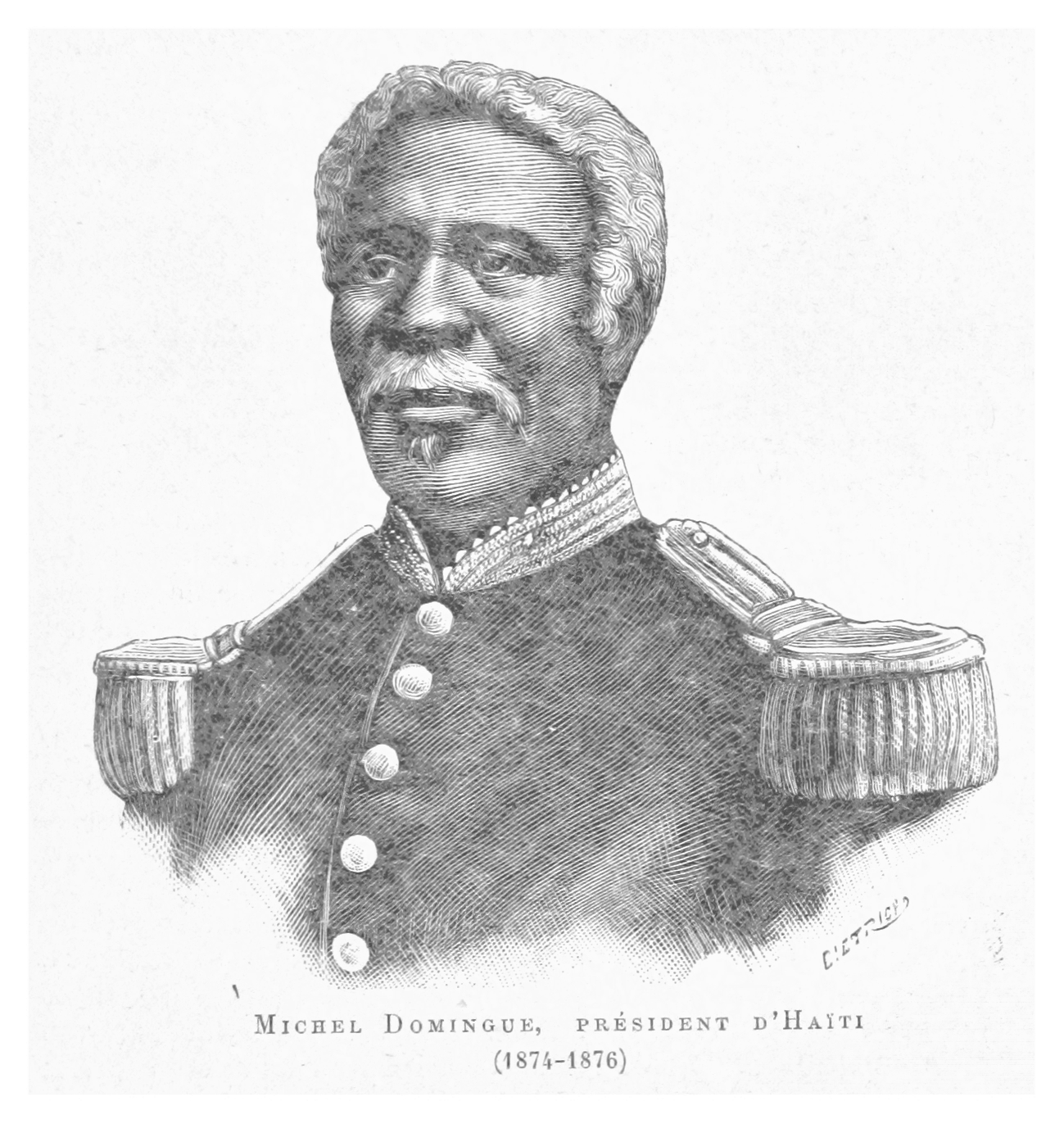
Michel Domingue

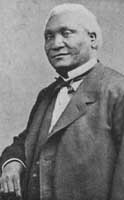
Lysius Salomon

== United States occupation (1915–1934) ==
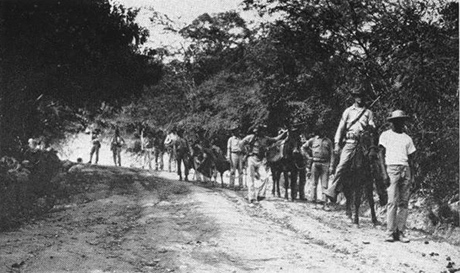
United States Marines and a Haitian guide patrolling the jungle in 1915 during the Battle of Fort Dipitie

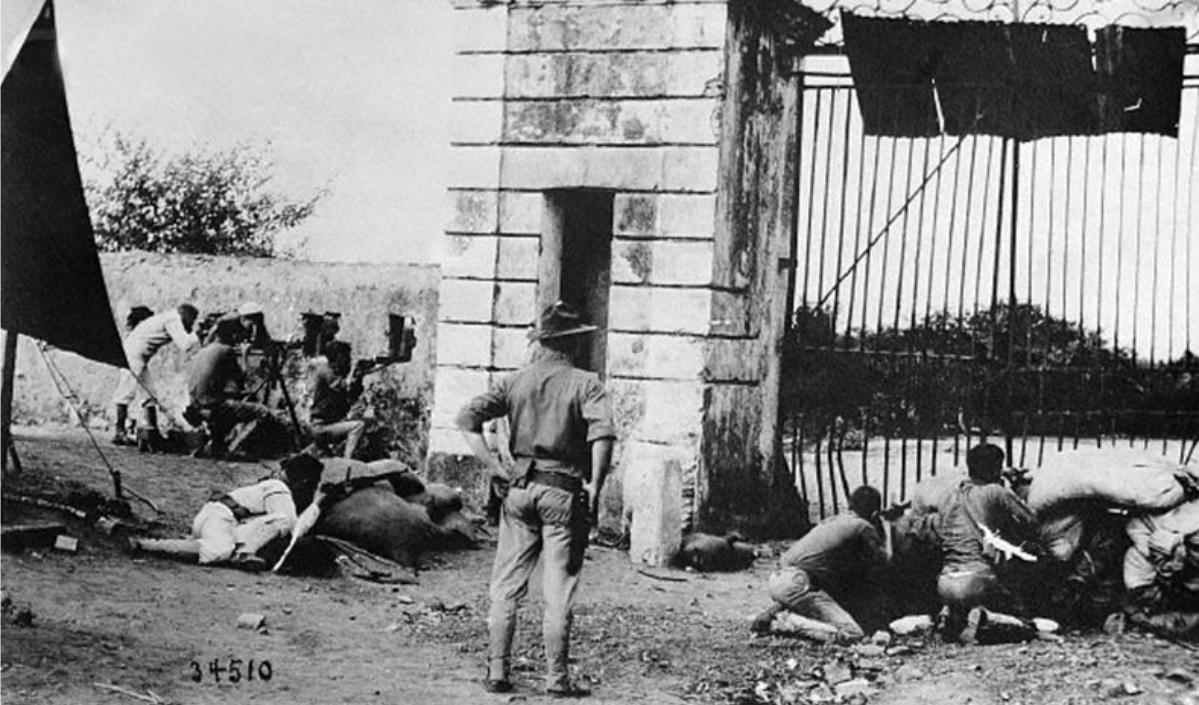
American Marines in 1915 defending the entrance gate in Cap-Haïten

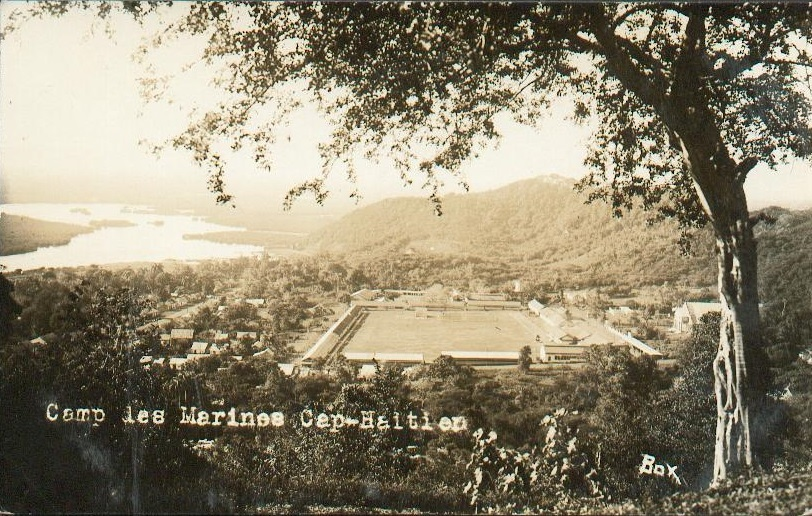
Marine's base at Cap-Haïtien

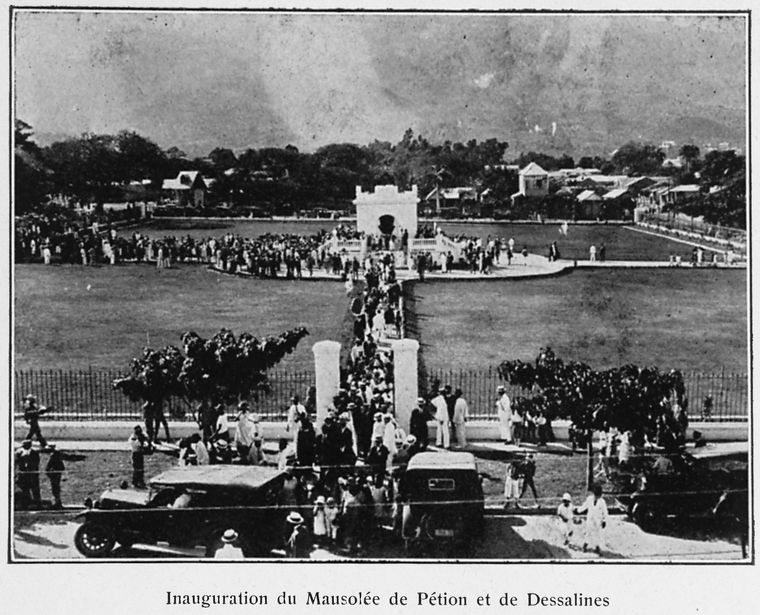
Opening of the mausoleum of Pétion and Dessalines in 1926

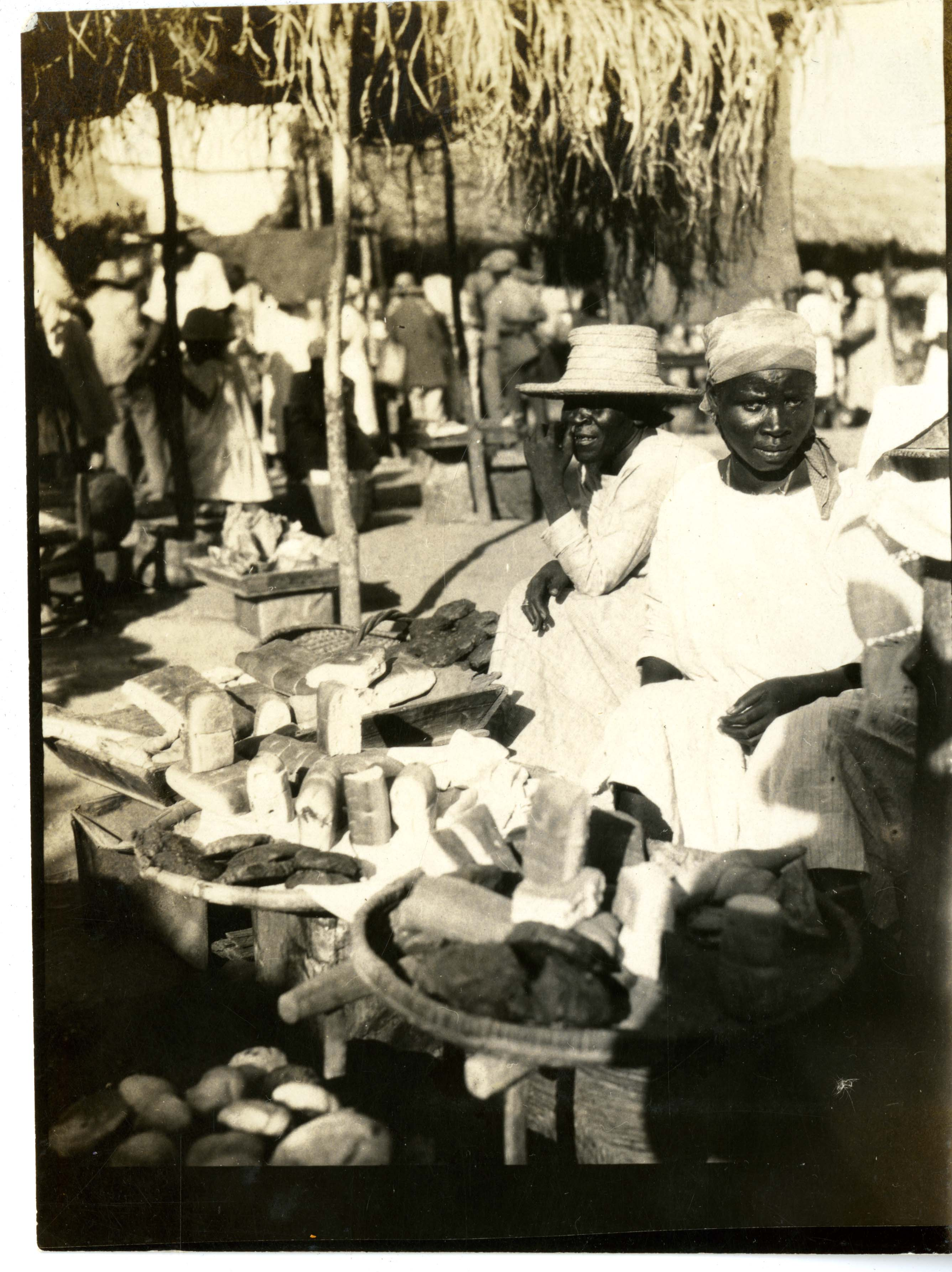
Bread market in St. Michel, 1928–1929

In 1915, after seven Haitian presidents had been violently deposed via assassination or coup d'état between 1911 and 1914, the United States responded to fears of undue German influence in the region as well as complaints to President Woodrow Wilson from American banks to which Haiti was deeply in debt, and occupied the country. The occupation of Haiti lasted until 1934. The US occupation was resented by Haitians as a loss of sovereignty and there were revolts against US forces. Reforms were carried out despite this.

Under the supervision of the United States Marines, the Haitian National Assembly elected Philippe Sudré Dartiguenave president. He signed the Haitian–American Convention, which gave the US the right to intervene in Haiti whenever it deemed necessary and allowed American officials to assume control over the Financial Advisory, Customs Receivership, the Constabulary, the Public Works Service, and the Public Health Service for a period of ten years. The principal instrument of American authority was the newly created Gendarmerie d'Haïti, commanded by American officers. In 1917, at the demand of US officials, the National Assembly was dissolved, and officials were designated to write a new constitution, which was largely dictated by officials in the US State Department and US Navy Department. Franklin D. Roosevelt, Under-Secretary for the Navy in the Wilson administration, claimed to have personally written the new constitution. This document abolished the prohibition on foreign ownership of land – the most essential component of Haitian law. When the newly elected National Assembly refused to pass this document and drafted one of its own preserving this prohibition, it was forcibly dissolved by Gendarmerie commandant Smedley Butler. This constitution was approved by a plebiscite in 1919, in which less than 5% of the population voted. The US State Department authorized this plebiscite presuming that "the people casting ballots would be 97% illiterate, ignorant in most cases of what they were voting for."

The Marines and Gendarmerie initiated an extensive road-building program to enhance their military effectiveness and open the country to US investment. Lacking any source of adequate funds, they revived an 1864 Haitian law, discovered by Butler, requiring peasants to perform labor on local roads in lieu of paying a road tax. This system, known as the corvée, originated in the unpaid labor that French peasants provided to their feudal lords. In 1915, Haiti had 3 miles (4.8 km) of road usable by automobile, outside the towns. By 1918, more than 470 miles (760 km) of road had been built or repaired through the corvée system, including a road linking Port-au-Prince to Cap-Haïtien. However, Haitians forced to work in the corvée labor-gangs, frequently dragged from their homes and harassed by armed guards, received few immediate benefits and saw this system of forced labor as a return to slavery at the hands of white men.

In 1919, a new caco uprising began, led by Charlemagne Péralte, vowing to 'drive the invaders into the sea and free Haiti.' The Cacos attacked Port-au-Prince in October but were driven back with heavy casualties. Afterwards, a Creole-speaking American Gendarmerie officer and two US marines infiltrated Péralte's camp, killing him and photographing his corpse in an attempt to demoralize the rebels. Leadership of the rebellion passed to Benoît Batraville, a Caco chieftain from Artibonite, who also launched an assault on the capital. His death in 1920 marked the end of hostilities. During Senate hearings in 1921, the commandant of the Marine Corps reported that, in the twenty months of active resistance, 2,250 Haitians had been killed. However, in a report to the Secretary of the Navy he reported the death toll as being 3,250. Haitian historians have estimated the true number was much higher; one suggested, "the total number of battle victims and casualties of repression and consequences of the war might have reached, by the end of the pacification period, four or five times that – somewhere in the neighborhood of 15,000 persons." According to Paul Farmer these higher figures are not supported by most historians outside Haiti.

In 1922, Dartiguenave was replaced by Louis Borno, who ruled without a legislature until 1930. That same year, General John H. Russell, Jr., was appointed High Commissioner. The Borno-Russel dictatorship oversaw the expansion of the economy, building over 1,000 miles (1,600 km) of road, establishing an automatic telephone exchange, modernizing the nation's port facilities, and establishing a public health service. Sisal was introduced to Haiti, and sugar and cotton became significant exports. However, efforts to develop commercial agriculture had limited success, in part because much of Haiti's labor force was employed at seasonal work in the more established sugar industries of Cuba and the Dominican Republic. An estimated 30,000–40,000 Haitian laborers, known as braceros, went annually to the Oriente Province of Cuba between 1913 and 1931. Most Haitians continued to resent the loss of sovereignty. At the forefront of opposition among the educated elite was L'Union Patriotique, which established ties with opponents of the occupation in the US itself, in particular the National Association for the Advancement of Colored People (NAACP).

The Great Depression decimated the prices of Haiti's exports and destroyed the tenuous gains of the previous decade. In December 1929, Marines in Les Cayes killed ten Haitians during a march to protest local economic conditions. This led Herbert Hoover to appoint two commissions, including one headed by a former US governor of the Philippines William Cameron Forbes, which criticized the exclusion of Haitians from positions of authority in the government and constabulary, now known as the Garde d'Haïti. In 1930, Sténio Vincent, a long-time critic of the occupation, was elected president, and the US began to withdraw its forces. The withdrawal was completed under US President Franklin D. Roosevelt (FDR), in 1934, under his "Good Neighbor policy". The US retained control of Haiti's external finances until 1947. All three rulers during the occupation came from the country's mulatto minority. At the same time, many in the growing black professional classes departed from the traditional veneration of Haiti's French cultural heritage and emphasized the nation's African roots, most notably ethnologist Jean Price-Mars and the journal Les Griots, edited by Dr. François Duvalier.

The transition government was left with a better infrastructure, public health, education, and agricultural development as well as a democratic system. The country had fully democratic elections in 1930, won by Sténio Vincent. The Garde was a new kind of military institution in Haiti. It was a force manned overwhelmingly by blacks, with a United States-trained black commander, Colonel Démosthènes Pétrus Calixte. Most of the Garde's officers, however, were mulattoes. The Garde was a national organization; it departed from the regionalism that had characterized most of Haiti's previous armies. In theory, its charge was apolitical—to maintain internal order, while supporting a popularly elected government. The Garde initially adhered to this role.

== Elections and coups (1934–1957) ==
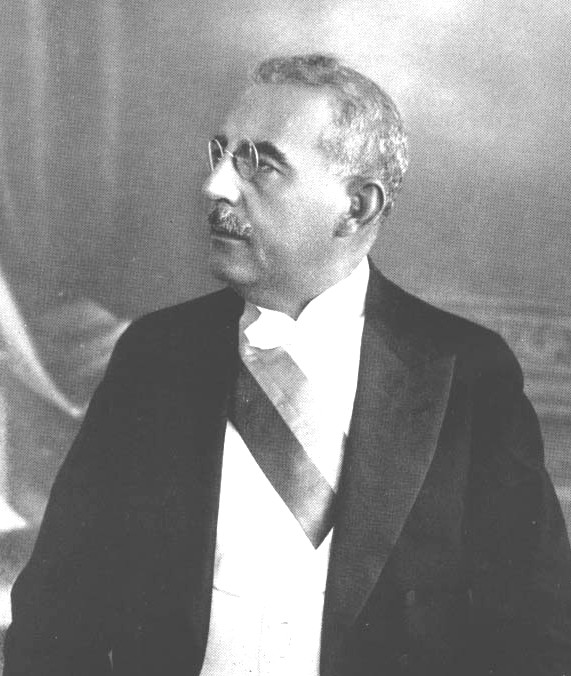
Sténio Vincent

=== Vincent presidency (1934–1941) ===
President Vincent took advantage of the comparative national stability, which was being maintained by a professionalized military, to gain absolute power. A plebiscite permitted the transfer of all authority in economic matters from the legislature to the executive, but Vincent was not content with this expansion of his power. In 1935 he forced through the legislature a new constitution, which was also approved by plebiscite. The constitution praised Vincent, and it granted the executive sweeping powers to dissolve the legislature at will, to reorganize the judiciary, to appoint ten of twenty-one senators (and to recommend the remaining eleven to the lower house), and to rule by decree when the legislature was not in session. Although Vincent implemented some improvements in infrastructure and services, he brutally repressed his opposition, censored the press, and governed largely to benefit himself and a clique of merchants and corrupt military officers.

Under Calixte the majority of Garde personnel had adhered to the doctrine of political nonintervention that their Marine Corps trainers had stressed. Over time, however, Vincent and Dominican dictator Rafael Leónidas Trujillo Molina sought to buy adherents among the ranks. Trujillo, determined to expand his influence over all of Hispaniola, in October 1937 ordered the indiscriminate butchery by the Dominican army of an estimated 14,000 to 40,000 Haitians on the Dominican side of the Massacre River. Some observers claim that Trujillo supported an abortive coup attempt by young Garde officers in December 1937. Vincent dismissed Calixte as commander and sent him abroad, where he eventually accepted a commission in the Dominican military as a reward for his efforts while on Trujillo's payroll. The attempted coup led Vincent to purge the officer corps of all members suspected of disloyalty, marking the end of the apolitical military.

=== Lescot presidency (1941–1946) ===
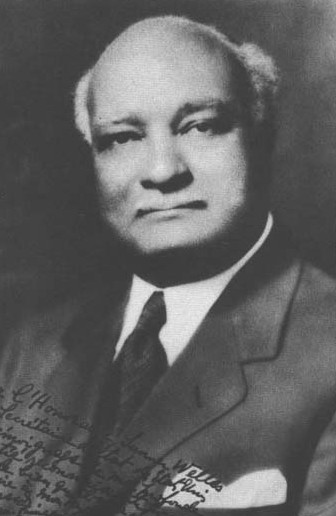
Élie Lescot

In 1941 Vincent showed every intention of standing for a third term as president, but after almost a decade of disengagement, the United States made it known that it would oppose such an extension. Vincent accommodated the Roosevelt administration and handed power over to Elie Lescot.

Lescot was of mixed race and had served in numerous government posts. He was competent and forceful, and many considered him a sterling candidate for the presidency, despite his elitist background. Like the majority of previous Haitian presidents, however, he failed to live up to his potential. His tenure paralleled that of Vincent in many ways. Lescot declared himself commander in chief of the military, and power resided in a clique that ruled with the tacit support of the Garde. He repressed his opponents, censored the press, and compelled the legislature to grant him extensive powers. He handled all budget matters without legislative sanction and filled legislative vacancies without calling elections. Lescot commonly said that Haiti's declared state-of-war against the Axis powers during World War II justified his repressive actions. Haiti, however, played no role in the war except for supplying the United States with raw materials and serving as a base for a United States Coast Guard detachment.

Aside from his authoritarian tendencies, Lescot had another flaw: his relationship with Rafael Trujillo. While serving as Haitian ambassador to the Dominican Republic, Lescot fell under the sway of Trujillo's influence and wealth. In fact, it was Trujillo's money that reportedly bought most of the legislative votes that brought Lescot to power. Their clandestine association persisted until 1943, when the two leaders parted ways for unknown reasons. Trujillo later made public all his correspondence with the Haitian leader. The move undermined Lescot's already dubious popular support.

In January 1946, events came to a head when Lescot jailed the Marxist editors of a journal called La Ruche (The Beehive). This action precipitated student strikes and protests by government workers, teachers, and shopkeepers in the capital and provincial cities. In addition, Lescot's mulatto-dominated rule had alienated the predominantly black Garde. His position became untenable, and he resigned on 11 January. Radio announcements declared that the Garde had assumed power, which it would administer through a three-member junta.

=== Revolution of 1946 ===
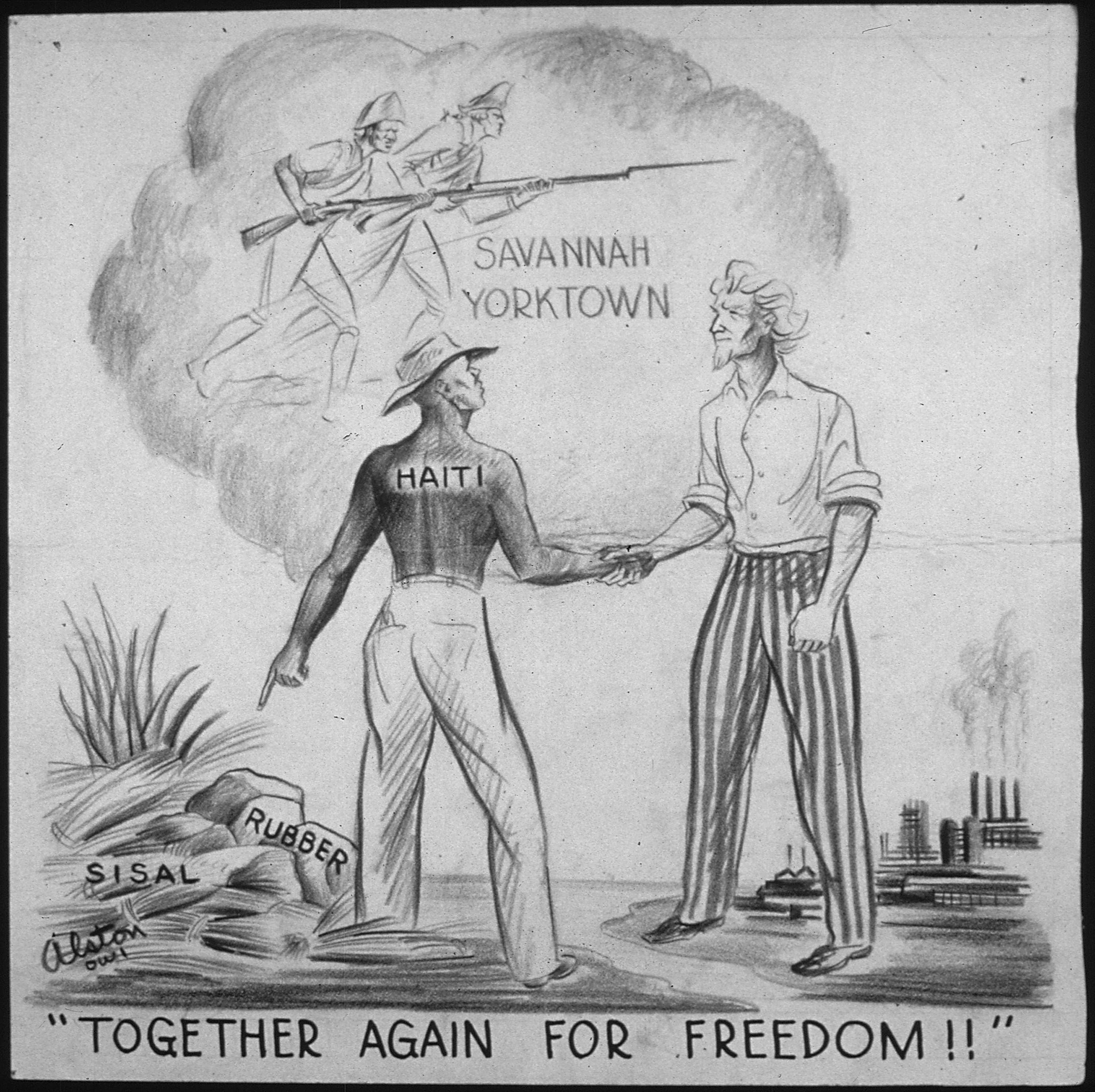
"Together again for freedom", 1943 U.S. leaflet

The Revolution of 1946 was a novel development in Haiti's history, as the Garde assumed power as an institution, not as the instrument of a particular commander. The members of the junta, known as the Military Executive Committee (Comité Exécutif Militaire), were Garde commander Colonel Franck Lavaud, Major Antoine Levelt, and Major Paul E. Magloire, commander of the Presidential Guard. All three understood Haiti's traditional way of exercising power, but they lacked a thorough understanding of what would be required to make the transition to an elected civilian government. Upon taking power, the junta pledged to hold free elections. The junta also explored other options, but public clamor, which included public demonstrations in support of potential candidates, eventually forced the officers to make good on their promise.

Haiti elected its National Assembly in May 1946. The Assembly set 16 August 1946, as the date on which it would select a president. The leading candidates for the office—all of whom were black—were Dumarsais Estimé, a former school teacher, assembly member, and cabinet minister under Vincent; Félix d'Orléans Juste Constant, leader of the Haitian Communist Party (Parti Communiste d'Haïti—PCH); and former Garde commander Démosthènes Pétrus Calixte, who stood as the candidate of a progressive coalition that included the Worker Peasant Movement (Mouvement Ouvrier Paysan—MOP). MOP chose to endorse Calixte, instead of a candidate from its own ranks, because the party's leader, Daniel Fignolé, was only thirty-three years old—too young to stand for the nation's highest office. Estimé, politically the most moderate of the three, drew support from the black population in the north, as well as from the emerging black middle class. The leaders of the military, who would not countenance the election of Juste Constant and who reacted warily to the populist Fignolé, also considered Estimé the safest candidate. After two rounds of polling, legislators gave Estimé the presidency.

=== Estimé presidency (1946–1950) ===
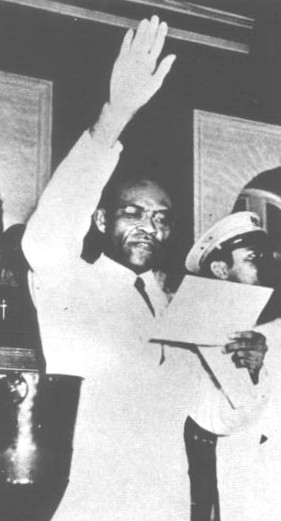
Dumarsais Estimé

Estimé's election represented a break with Haiti's political tradition. Although he was reputed to have received support from commanders of the Garde, Estimé was a civilian. Of humble origins, he was passionately anti-elitist and therefore generally anti-mulatto. He demonstrated, at least initially, a genuine concern for the welfare of the people. Operating under a new constitution that went into effect in November 1946, Estimé proposed, but never secured passage of, Haiti's first social- security legislation. He did, however, expand the school system, encourage the establishment of rural cooperatives, raise the salaries of civil servants, and increase the representation of middle-class and lower-class blacks in the public sector. He also attempted to gain the favor of the Garde—renamed the Haitian Army (Armée d'Haïti) in March 1947—by promoting Lavaud to brigadier general and by seeking United States military assistance.

Estimé eventually fell victim to two of the time-honored pitfalls of Haitian rule: elite intrigue and personal ambition. The elite had a number of grievances against Estimé. Not only had he largely excluded them from the often lucrative levers of government, but he also enacted the country's first income tax, fostered the growth of labor unions, and suggested that vodou be considered as a religion equivalent to Roman Catholicism—a notion that the Europeanized elite abhorred. Lacking direct influence in Haitian affairs, the elite resorted to clandestine lobbying among the officer corps. Their efforts, in combination with deteriorating domestic conditions, led to a coup in May 1950.

To be sure, Estimé had hastened his own demise in several ways. His nationalization of the Standard Fruit Company banana concession sharply reduced the firm's revenues. He alienated workers by requiring them to invest between 10 percent and 15 percent of their salaries in national-defense bonds. The president sealed his fate by attempting to manipulate the constitution in order to extend his term in office. Seizing on this action and the popular unrest it engendered, the army forced the president to resign on 10 May 1950. The same junta that had assumed power after the fall of Lescot reinstalled itself. An army escort conducted Estimé from the National Palace and into exile in Jamaica. The events of May 1946 made an impression upon the deposed minister of labor, François Duvalier. The lesson that Duvalier drew from Estimé's ouster was that the military could not be trusted. It was a lesson that he would act upon when he gained power.

=== Magloire presidency (1950–1956) ===
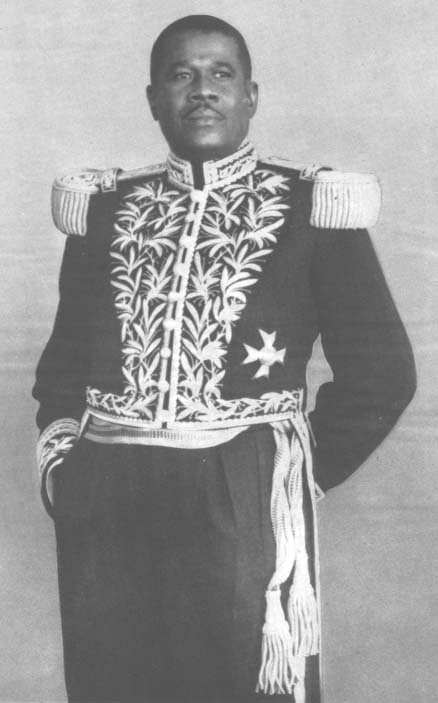
Paul Magloire

The power balance within the junta shifted between 1946 and 1950. Lavaud was the preeminent member at the time of the first coup, but Magloire, now a colonel, dominated after Estimé's overthrow. When Haiti announced that its first direct elections (all men twenty-one or over were allowed to vote) would be held on 8 October 1950, Magloire resigned from the junta and declared himself a candidate for president. In contrast to the chaotic political climate of 1946, the campaign of 1950 proceeded under the implicit understanding that only a strong candidate backed by both the army and the elite would be able to take power. Facing only token opposition, Magloire won the election and assumed office on 6 December.

Magloire restored the elite to prominence. The business community and the government benefited from favorable economic conditions until Hurricane Hazel hit the island in 1954. Haiti made some improvements on its infrastructure, but most of these were financed largely by foreign loans. By Haitian standards, Magloire's rule was firm, but not harsh: he jailed political opponents, including Fignolé, and shut down their presses when their protests grew too strident, but he allowed labor unions to function, although they were not permitted to strike. It was in the arena of corruption, however, that Magloire overstepped traditional bounds. The president controlled the sisal, cement, and soap monopolies. He and other officials built imposing mansions. The injection of international hurricane relief funds into an already corrupt system boosted graft to levels that disillusioned all Haitians. To make matters worse, Magloire followed in the footsteps of many previous presidents by disputing the termination date of his stay in office. Politicians, labor leaders, and their followers flocked to the streets in May 1956 to protest Magloire's failure to step down. Although Magloire declared martial law, a general strike essentially shut down Port-au-Prince. Again like many before him, Magloire fled to Jamaica, leaving the army with the task of restoring order.

=== Rise of Duvalier (1956–1957) ===
The period between the fall of Magloire and the election of Duvalier in September 1957 was a chaotic one, even by Haitian standards. Three provisional presidents held office during this interval; one resigned and the army deposed the other two, Franck Sylvain and Fignolé. Duvalier is said to have engaged actively in the behind-the-scenes intrigue that helped him to emerge as the presidential candidate that the military favored. The military went on to guide the campaign and the elections in a way that gave Duvalier every possible advantage. Most political actors perceived Duvalier—a medical doctor who had served as a rural administrator of a United States-funded anti-yaws campaign before entering the cabinet under Estimé—as an honest and fairly unassuming leader without a strong ideological motivation or program. When elections were finally organized, this time under terms of universal suffrage (both men and women now had the vote), Duvalier painted himself as the legitimate heir to Estimé. This approach was enhanced by the fact that Duvalier's only viable opponent, Louis Déjoie, was a mulatto and the scion of a prominent family. Duvalier scored a decisive victory at the polls. His followers took two-thirds of the legislature's lower house and all of the seats in the Senate.

== Duvalier era (1957–1986) ==
=== 'Papa Doc' (1957–1971) ===
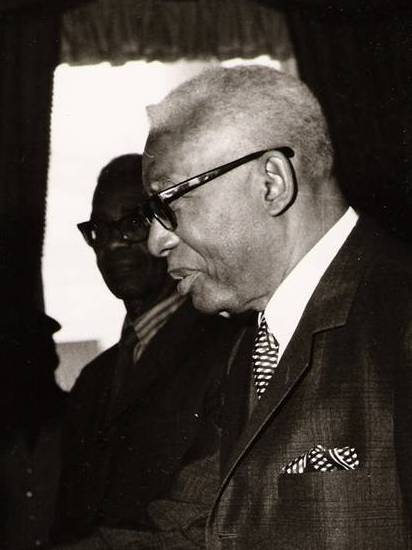
François Duvalier in 1968

A former Minister of Health who had earned a reputation as a humanitarian while serving as an administrator in a U.S.-funded anti-yaws campaign, François Duvalier (known as "Papa Doc") soon established another dictatorship. His regime is regarded as one of the most repressive and corrupt of modern times, combining violence against political opponents with exploitation of Vodou to instill fear in the majority of the population. Duvalier's paramilitary police, officially the Volunteers for National Security (Volontaires de la Sécurité Nationale – VSN) but more commonly known as the Tonton Macoutes, named for a Vodou monster, carried out political murders, beatings, and intimidation. An estimated 30,000 to 60,000 Haitians were killed by his government for political reasons. Duvalier employed rape as a political tool to silence political opposition. Incorporating many houngans into the ranks of the Macoutes, his public recognition of Vodou and its practitioners and his private adherence to Vodou ritual, combined with his reputed private knowledge of magic and sorcery, enhanced his popular persona among the common people and served as a peculiar form of legitimization.

Duvalier's policies, designed to end the dominance of the mulatto elite over the nation's economic and political life, led to massive emigration of educated people, deepening Haiti's economic and social problems. However, Duvalier appealed to the black middle class of which he was a member by introducing public works into middle-class neighborhoods that previously had been unable to have paved roads, running water, or modern sewage systems. In 1964, Duvalier proclaimed himself "President for Life".

The Kennedy administration suspended aid in 1961, after allegations that Duvalier had pocketed aid money and intended to use a Marine Corps mission to strengthen the Macoutes. Duvalier also clashed with Dominican President Juan Bosch in 1963, after Bosch provided aid and asylum to Haitian exiles working to overthrow his regime. He ordered the Presidential Guard to occupy the Dominican chancery in Pétion-Ville to apprehend an officer involved in a plot to kidnap his children, leading Bosch to publicly threaten to invade Haiti. However, the Dominican army, which distrusted Bosch's leftist leanings, expressed little support for an invasion, and the dispute was settled by OAS emissaries.

In 1971, Papa Doc entered into a 99-year contract with Don Pierson representing Dupont Caribbean Inc. of Texas for a free port project on the old buccaneer stronghold of Tortuga island located some 10 miles (16 km) off the north coast of the main Haitian island of Hispaniola.

=== 'Baby Doc' (1971–1986) ===
On Duvalier's death in April 1971, power passed to his 19-year-old son Jean-Claude Duvalier (known as "Baby Doc"). Under Jean-Claude Duvalier, Haiti's economic and political condition continued to decline, although some of the more fearsome elements of his father's regime were abolished. Foreign officials and observers also seemed more tolerant toward Baby Doc, in areas such as human-rights monitoring, and foreign countries were more generous to him with economic assistance. The United States restored its aid program in 1971. In 1974, Baby Doc expropriated the Freeport Tortuga project and this caused the venture to collapse. Content to leave administrative matters in the hands of his mother, Simone Ovid Duvalier, while living as a playboy, Jean-Claude enriched himself through a series of fraudulent schemes. Much of the Duvaliers' wealth, amounting to hundreds of millions of dollars over the years, came from the Régie du Tabac (Tobacco Administration), a tobacco monopoly established by Estimé, which expanded to include the proceeds from all government enterprises and served as a slush fund for which no balance sheets were ever kept. His marriage, in 1980, to a beautiful mulatto divorcée, Michèle Bennett, in a $3 million (~$9.83 million in 2025) ceremony, provoked widespread opposition, as it was seen as a betrayal of his father's antipathy towards the mulatto elite. At the request of Michèle, Papa Doc's widow Simone was expelled from Haiti. Baby Doc's kleptocracy left the regime vulnerable to unanticipated crises, exacerbated by endemic poverty, most notably the epidemic of African swine fever virus—which, at the insistence of USAID officials, led to the slaughter of the creole pigs, the principal source of income for most Haitians; and the widely publicized outbreak of AIDS in the early 1980s. Widespread discontent in Haiti began in 1983, when Pope John Paul II condemned the regime during a visit, finally provoking a rebellion, and in February 1986, after months of disorder, the army forced Duvalier to resign and go into exile.

== Struggle for democracy (1986–present day) ==
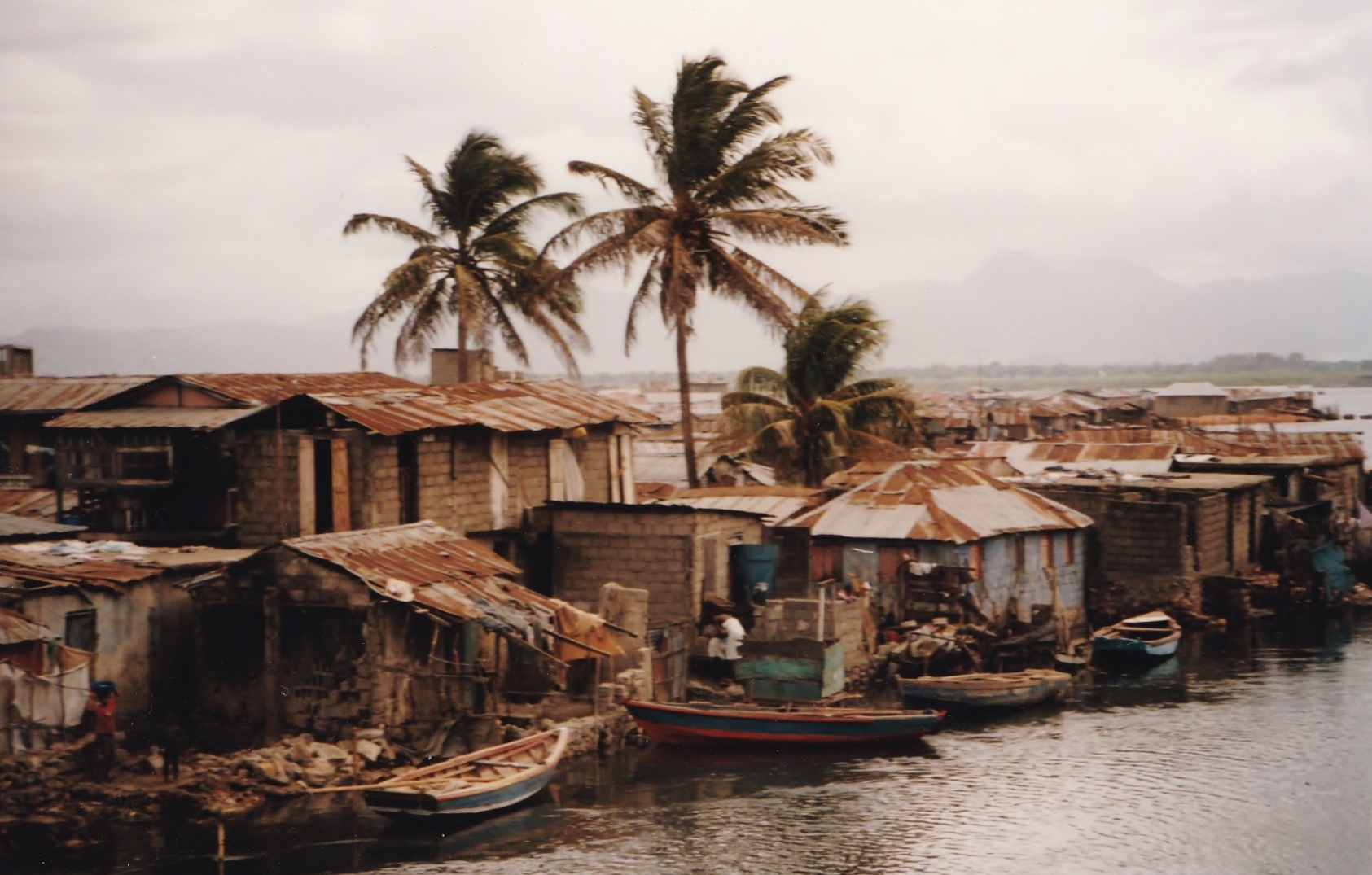
Fishing village in Haiti, 1996

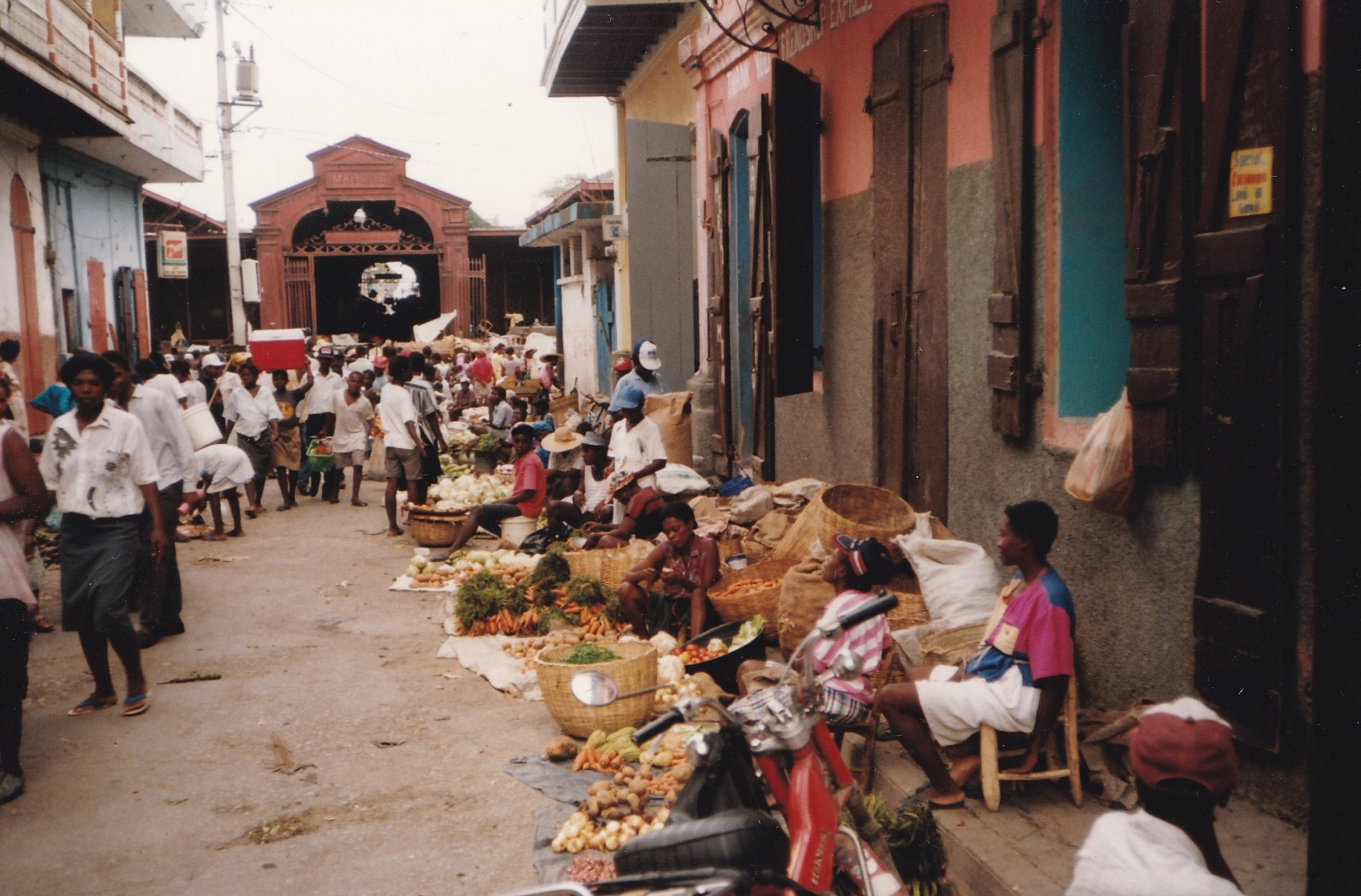
Market street in Port-au-Prince, 1996

=== Transitional government (1986–1990) ===
From 1986 to early 1988 Haiti was ruled by a provisional military government under General Namphy. In 1987, a new constitution was ratified, providing for an elected bicameral parliament, an elected president, and a prime minister, cabinet, ministers, and supreme court appointed by the president with parliament's consent. The Constitution also provided for political decentralization through the election of mayors and administrative bodies responsible for local government. The November 1987 elections were cancelled after troops massacred 30–300 voters on election day. Jimmy Carter later wrote that "Citizens who lined up to vote were mowed down by fusillades of terrorists' bullets. Military leaders, who had either orchestrated or condoned the murders, moved in to cancel the election and retain control of the Government." The election was followed several months later by the Haitian presidential election, 1988, which was boycotted by almost all the previous candidates, and saw turnout of just 4%.

The 1988 elections led to Professor Leslie Manigat becoming president, but three months later he too was ousted by the military. Further instability ensued, with several massacres, including the St Jean Bosco massacre in which the church of Jean-Bertrand Aristide was attacked and burned down. During this period, the Haitian National Intelligence Service (SIN), which had been set up and financed in the 80s by the Central Intelligence Agency as part of the war on drugs, participated in drug trafficking and political violence.

=== Rise of Aristide (1990–1991) ===
In December 1990, Jean-Bertrand Aristide, a liberation theology Roman Catholic (Salesian) priest, won 67% of the vote in elections that international observers deemed largely free and fair. Aristide's radical populist policies and the violence of his bands of supporters alarmed many of the country's elite, and, in September 1991, he was overthrown in the 1991 Haitian coup d'état, which brought General Raoul Cédras to power. The coup saw hundreds killed, and Aristide was forced into exile, his life saved by international diplomatic intervention.

=== Military rule (1991–1994) ===
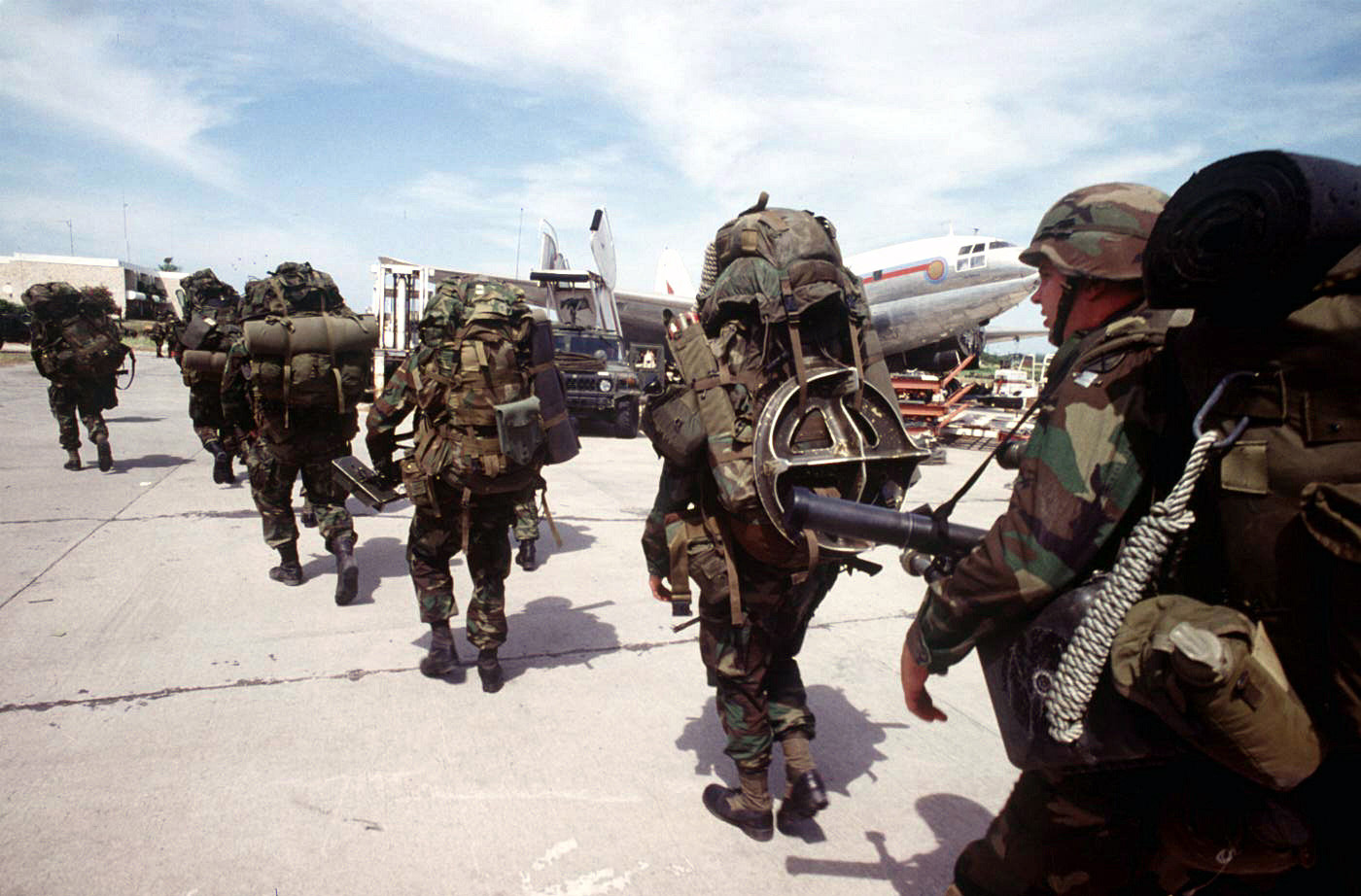
U.S. troops seizing Port-au-Prince airfield, September 1994

An estimated 3,000–5,000 Haitians were killed during the period of military rule. The coup created a large-scale exodus of refugees to the United States. The United States Coast Guard interdicted (in many cases, rescued) a total of 41,342 Haitians during 1991 and 1992. Most were denied entry to the United States and repatriated back to Haiti. Aristide has accused the United States of backing the 1991 coup. In response to the coup, the United Nations Security Council passed Resolution 841 imposing international sanctions and an arms embargo on Haiti.

On 16 February 1993, the ferry Neptune sank, drowning an estimated 700 passengers. This was the worst ferry disaster in Haitian history.

The military regime governed Haiti until 1994, and according to some sources included drug trafficking led by Chief of National Police Michel François. Various initiatives to end the political crisis through the peaceful restoration of the constitutionally elected government failed. In July 1994, as repression mounted in Haiti and a civilian human rights monitoring mission was expelled from the country, the United Nations Security Council adopted United Nations Security Council Resolution 940, which authorized member states to use all necessary means to facilitate the departure of Haiti's military leadership and to restore Haiti's constitutionally elected government to power.

=== Return of Aristide (1994–1996) ===
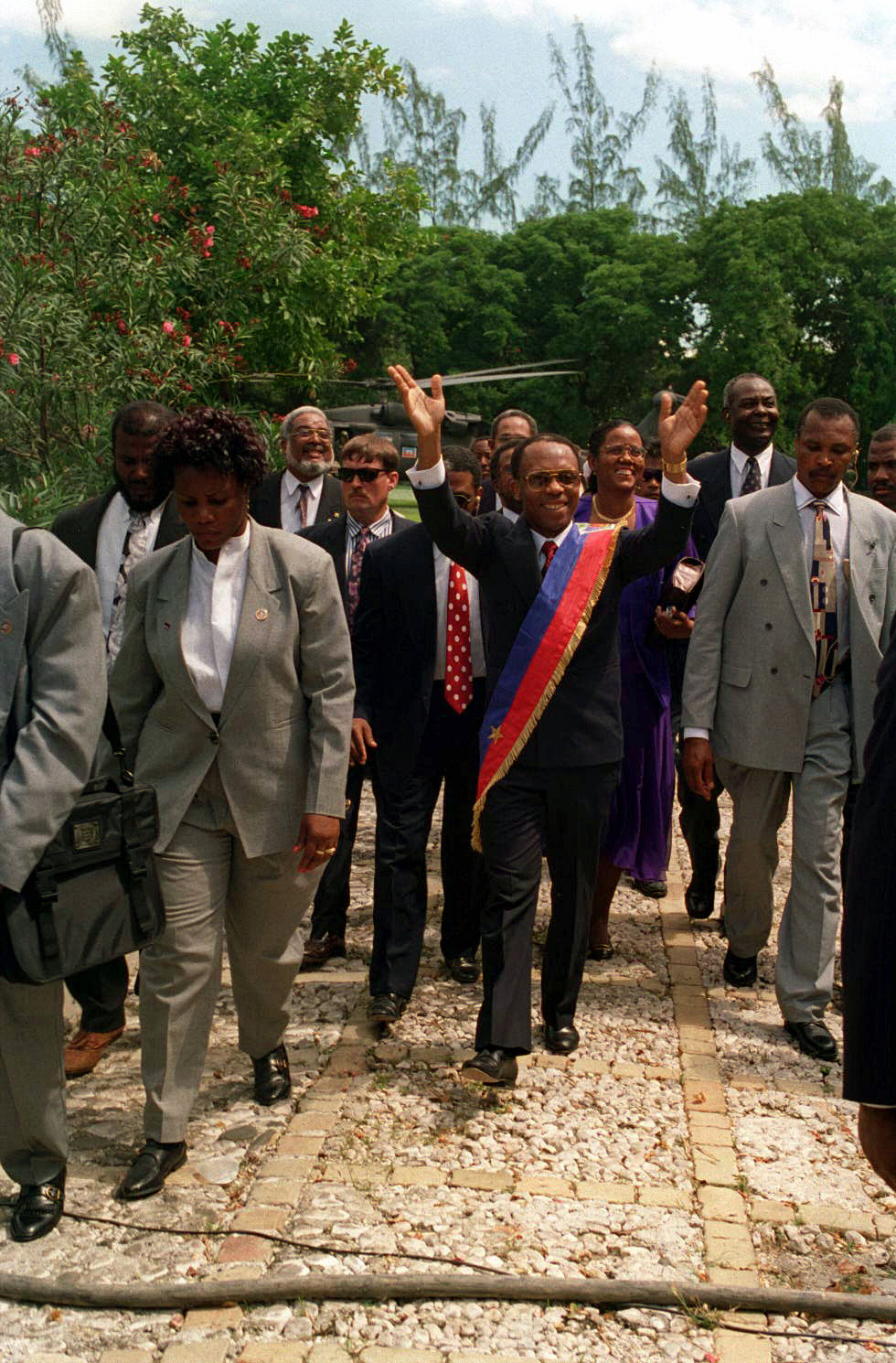
President Jean-Bertrand Aristide returns triumphantly to the National Palace at Port-au-Prince in 1994

In mid-September 1994, with U.S. troops prepared to enter Haiti by force for Operation Uphold Democracy, President Bill Clinton dispatched a negotiating team led by former president Jimmy Carter to persuade the authorities to step aside and allow for the return of constitutional rule. With intervening troops already airborne, Cédras and other top leaders agreed to step down. In October, Aristide was able to return. The Haitian general election, 1995 in June 1995 saw Aristide's coalition, the Lavalas (Waterfall) Political Organization, gain a sweeping victory, and René Préval, a prominent Aristide political ally, elected president with 88% of the vote. When Aristide's term ended in February 1996, this was Haiti's first ever transition between two democratically elected presidents.

=== First Préval presidency (1996–2001) ===
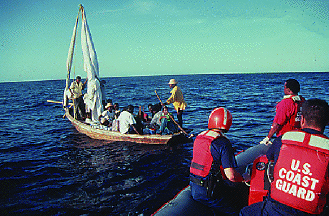
U.S. Coast Guard intercepting Haitian refugees, 1998

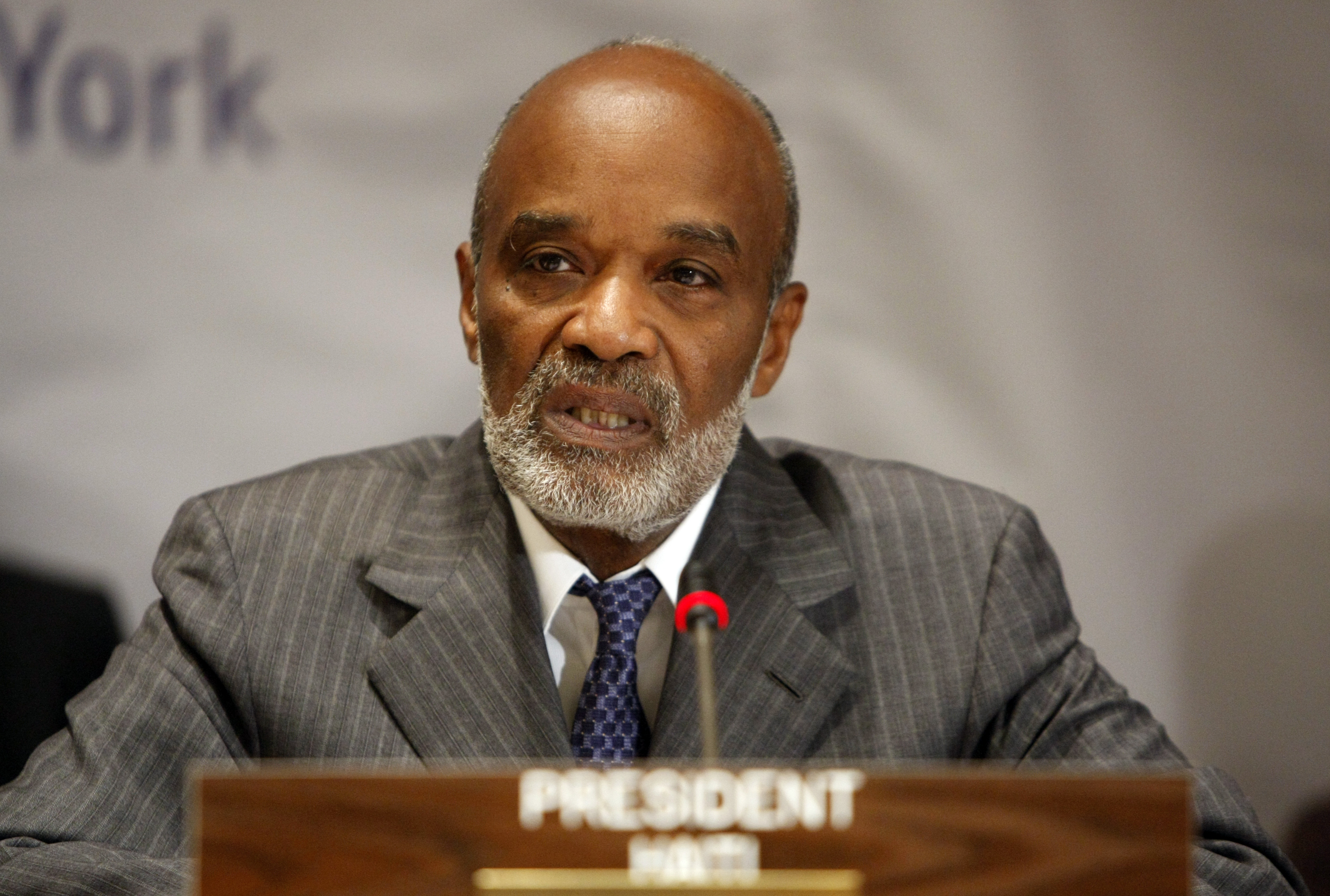
René Préval

In late 1996, Aristide broke with Préval and formed a new political party, the Lavalas Family (Fanmi Lavalas, FL), which won elections in April 1997 for one-third of the Senate and local assemblies, but these results were not accepted by the government. The split between Aristide and Préval produced a dangerous political deadlock, and the government was unable to organize the local and parliamentary elections due in late 1998. In January 1999, Préval dismissed legislators whose terms had expired – the entire Chamber of Deputies and all but nine members of the Senate, and Préval then ruled by decree.

=== Second Aristide presidency (2001–2004) ===
In May 2000 the Haitian legislative election, 2000 for the Chamber of Deputies and two-thirds of the Senate took place. The election drew a voter turnout of more than 60%, and the FL won a virtual sweep. However, the elections were marred by controversy in the Senate race over the calculation of whether Senate candidates had achieved the majority required to avoid a run-off election (in Haiti, seats where no candidate wins an absolute majority of votes cast has to enter a second-round run-off election). The validity of the Electoral Council's post-ballot calculations of whether a majority had been attained was disputed. The Organization of American States complained about the calculation and declined to observe the July run-off elections. The opposition parties, regrouped in the Democratic Convergence (Convergence Démocratique, CD), demanded that the elections be annulled, and that Préval stand down and be replaced by a provisional government. In the meantime, the opposition announced it would boycott the November presidential and senatorial elections. Haiti's main aid donors threatened to cut off aid. At the November 2000 elections, boycotted by the opposition, Aristide was again elected president, with more than 90% of the vote, on a turnout of around 50% according to international observers. The opposition refused to accept the result or to recognize Aristide as president. Due to these events, Haiti's donor, the European Union and the United States, cut off aid to the country.

Allegations emerged of drug trafficking reaching into the upper echelons of government, as it had done under the military regimes of the 1980s and early 1990s (illegal drug trade in Haiti). Canadian police arrested Oriel Jean, Aristide's security chief and one of his most trusted friends, for money laundering. Beaudoin Ketant, a notorious international drug trafficker, Aristide's close partner, and his daughter's godfather, claimed that Aristide "turned the country into a narco-country; it's a one-man show; you either pay (Aristide) or you die".

Aristide spent years negotiating with the Convergence Démocratique on new elections, but the Convergence's inability to develop a sufficient electoral base made elections unattractive, and it rejected every deal offered, preferring to call for a US invasion to topple Aristide.

=== 2004 coup d'état ===
Anti-Aristide protests in January 2004 led to violent clashes in Port-au-Prince, causing several deaths. In February, a revolt broke out in the city of Gonaïves, which was soon under rebel control. The rebellion then began to spread, and Cap-Haïtien, Haiti's second-largest city, was captured. A mediation team of diplomats presented a plan to reduce Aristide's power while allowing him to remain in office until the end of his constitutional term. Although Aristide accepted the plan, it was rejected by the opposition.

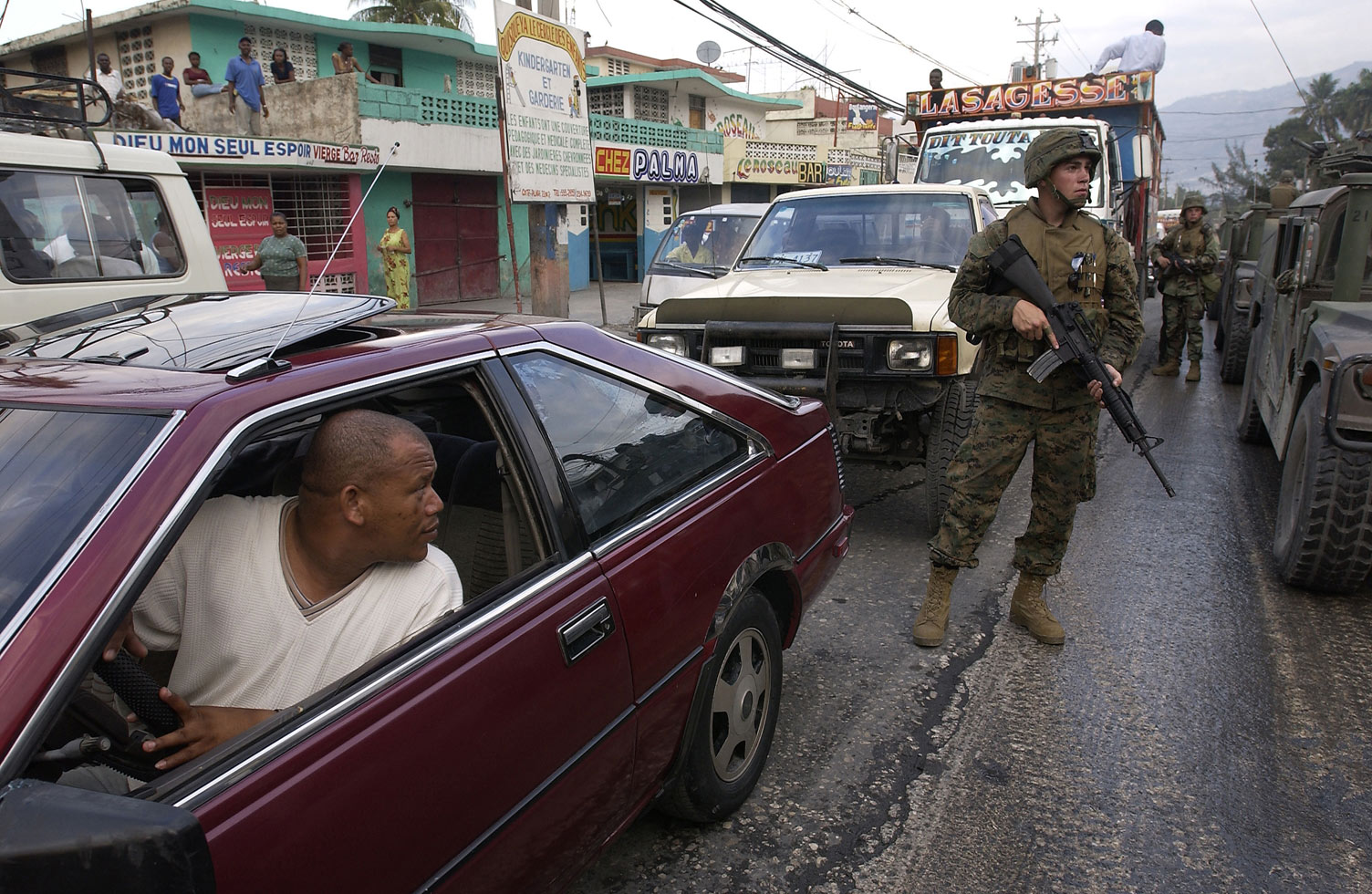
U.S. Marines patrol the streets of Port-au-Prince, 9 March 2004

On 29 February 2004, with rebel contingents marching towards Port-au-Prince, Aristide departed from Haiti. Aristide insists that he was essentially kidnapped by the U.S., while the U.S. State Department maintains that he resigned from office. Aristide and his wife left Haiti on an American airplane, escorted by American diplomats and military personnel, and were flown directly to Bangui, capital of the Central African Republic, where he stayed for the following two weeks, before seeking asylum in a less remote location.

Though this has never been proven, many observers in the press and academia believe that the US has not provided convincing answers to several of the more suspicious details surrounding the coup, such as the circumstances under which the US obtained Aristide's purported letter of "resignation" (as presented by the US) which, translated from Kreyòl, may not have actually read as a resignation.

Aristide has accused the U.S. of deposing him in concert with the Haitian opposition. In a 2006 interview, he said the U.S. went back on their word regarding compromises he made with them over privatization of enterprises to ensure that part of the profits would go to the Haitian people and then "relied on a disinformation campaign" to discredit him.

Political organizations and writers, as well as Aristide himself, have suggested that the rebellion was in fact a foreign controlled coup d'état. Caricom, which had been backing the peace deal, accused the United States, France, and the International community of failing in Haiti because they allegedly allowed a controversially elected leader to be violently forced out of office. The international community stated that the crisis was of Aristide's making and that he was not acting in the best interests of his country. They have argued that his removal was necessary for future stability in the island state.

American investigators and Haitian investigators under the U.S.-backed interim Haitian government claimed to have discovered extensive embezzlement, corruption, and money laundering by Aristide. They claimed Aristide had stolen tens of millions of dollars from the country. None of the allegations about Aristide's involvement in embezzlement, corruption, or money laundering schemes could be proven. The criminal court case brought against Aristide was quietly shelved, though various members of his Lavalas party languished for years in prison without charge or trial due to similar accusations The Haitian government suspended the suit against Aristide on 30 Jun 2006 to prevent it from being thrown out for want of prosecution.

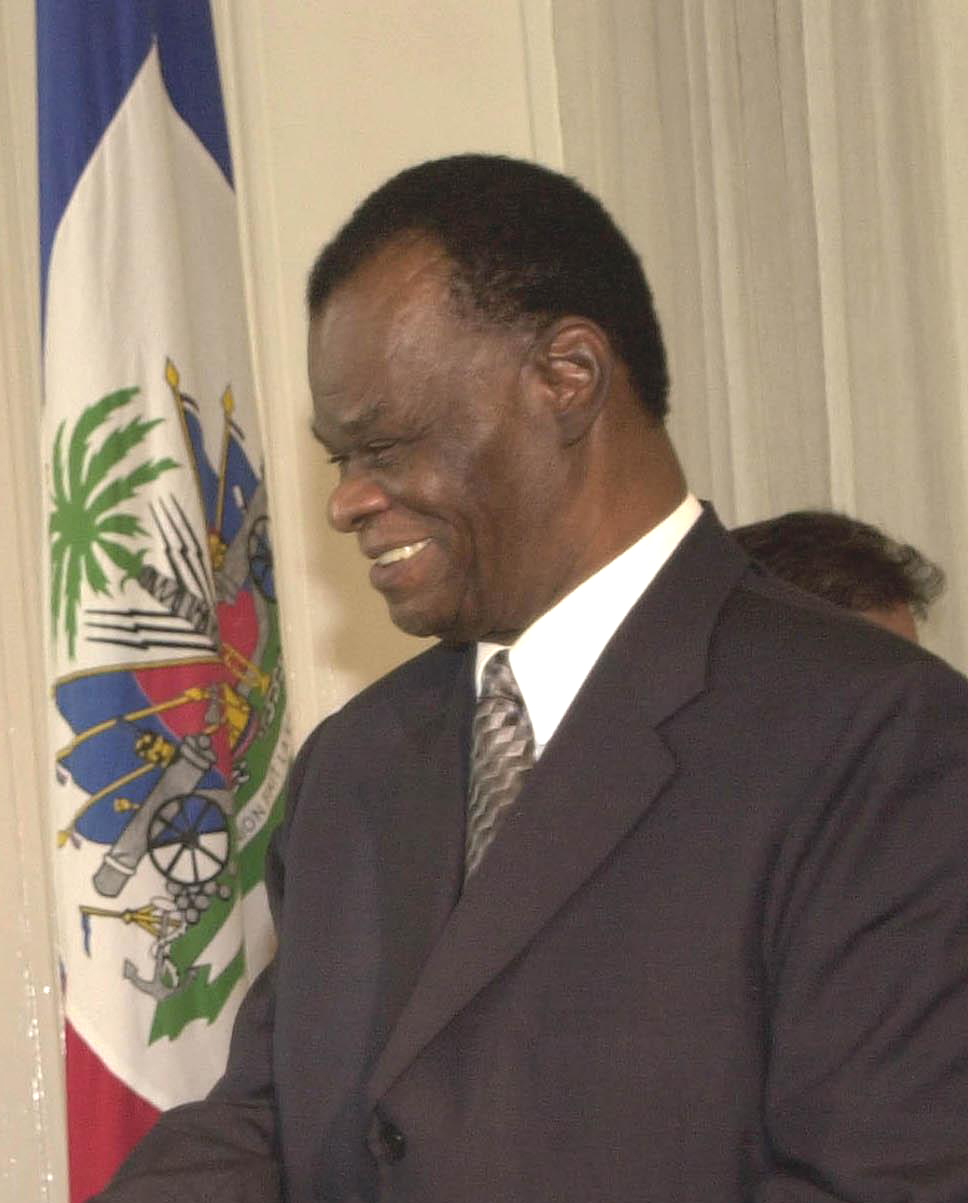
Provisional President Boniface Alexandre (2004–2006) led the intervention of the UN peacekeeping force in Haiti in 2004.

The government was taken over by Supreme Court Chief Justice Boniface Alexandre. Alexandre petitioned the United Nations Security Council for the intervention of an international peacekeeping force. The Security Council passed a resolution the same day "[t]aking note of the resignation of Jean-Bertrand Aristide as President of Haiti and the swearing-in of President Boniface Alexandre as the acting President of Haiti in accordance with the Constitution of Haiti" and authorized such a mission. As a vanguard of the official U.N. force, a force of about 1,000 U.S. Marines arrived in Haiti within the day, and Canadian and French troops arrived the next morning; the United Nations indicated it would send a team to assess the situation within days. On 1 June 2004, the peacekeeping mission was passed to MINUSTAH and comprised a 7,000 strength force led by Brazil and backed by Argentina, Chile, Jordan, Morocco, Nepal, Peru, Philippines, Spain, Sri Lanka, and Uruguay.

Brazilian forces led the United Nations peacekeeping troops in Haiti composed of United States, France, Canada, and Chile deployments. These peacekeeping troops were a part of the ongoing MINUSTAH operation.

In November 2004, the University of Miami School of Law carried out a Human Rights Investigation in Haiti and documented serious human rights abuses. It stated that "summary executions are a police tactic." It also suggested a "disturbing pattern."

In March 2004, the Haiti Commission of Inquiry, headed by former US attorney-general Ramsey Clark, published its findings : "Noting that 200 US special forces had travelled to the Dominican Republic for "military exercises" in February 2003, the commission accused the US of arming and training Haitian rebels there. With permission from the Dominican president, Hipólito Mejía, US forces trained near the border, in an area used by former soldiers of the disbanded Haitian army to launch attacks on Haitian state property."

On 15 October 2005, Brazil called for more troops to be sent due to the worsening situation in the country.

After Aristide's overthrow, the violence in Haiti continued, despite the presence of peacekeepers. Clashes between police and Fanmi Lavalas supporters were common, and peacekeeping forces were accused of conducting a massacre against the residents of Cité Soleil in July 2005. Several of the protests resulted in violence and deaths.

=== Second Préval presidency (2006–2011) ===
In the midst of the ongoing controversy and violence, however, the interim government planned legislative and executive elections. After being postponed several times, these were held in February 2006. The elections were won by René Préval, who had a strong following among the poor, with 51% of the votes. Préval took office in May 2006.

In the spring of 2008, Haitians demonstrated against rising food prices. In some instances, the few main roads on the island were blocked with burning tires and the airport at Port-au-Prince was closed. Protests and demonstrations by Fanmi Lavalas continued in 2009.

=== Earthquake of 2010 ===
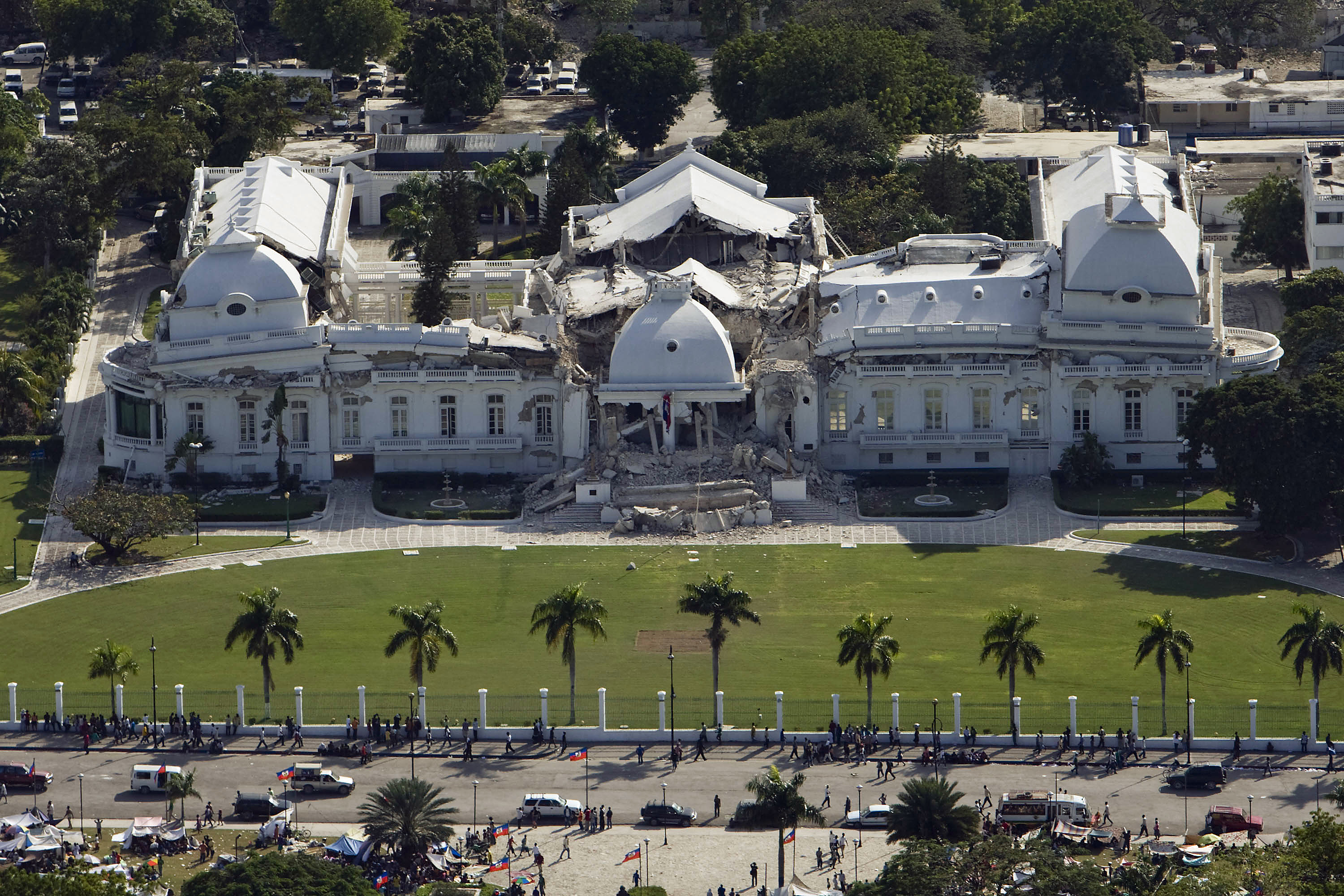
Large portions of the National Palace collapsed.

On 12 January 2010, Port-au-Prince, Haiti suffered a devastating earthquake of magnitude 7.0 with a death toll estimated by the Haitian government at over 316,000, and by non-Haitian sources from 50,000 to 220,000. Aftershocks followed, including one of magnitude 5.9. The capital city, Port-au-Prince, was effectively leveled. A million Haitians were left homeless, and hundreds of thousands starved. The earthquake caused massive devastation with most buildings crumbled, including Haiti's presidential palace. The enormous death toll made it necessary to bury the dead in mass graves. Most bodies were unidentified and few pictures were taken, making it impossible for families to identify their loved ones. The spread of disease was a major secondary disaster. Many survivors were treated for injuries in emergency makeshift hospitals, but many more died of gangrene, malnutrition, and infectious diseases.

=== Martelly presidency (2011–2016) ===
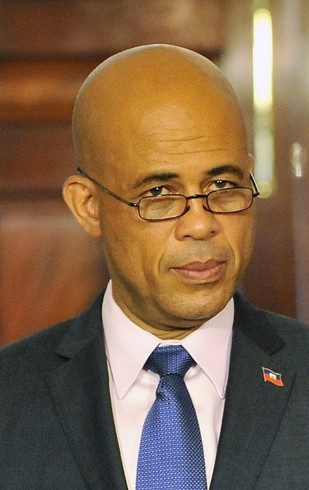
Michel Martelly

On 4 April 2011, a senior Haitian official announced that Michel Martelly had won the second round of the election against candidate Mirlande Manigat. The election involved voter suppression and other methods of rigging. Michel Martelly also known by his stage name "Sweet Micky" is a former musician and businessman. Martelly's administration was met with both anger and acclaim. On one hand, he and his associates were accused of being involved in money laundering and various other crimes resulting in countless demonstrations (which on many occasions would become violent). Many criticized him for the slow progression of the reconstruction phase following the recent quake, or for taking credit for projects started in previous administrations. Some disliked him for his vulgar language and risque past which did not seem to completely go away upon taking presidency. On the other hand, many believe that he was the most productive Haitian president since the Duvalier era. Under his administration, the majority of those left homeless following the quake were given new housing. He offered free education programs to large portions of the Haitian youth as well as an income program for Haitian mothers and students. The administration launched a massive reconstruction program involving principle administration district, Champs-de-Mars, that would modernize and rehabilitate various government buildings, public places, and parks. Michel Martelly put emphasis on foreign investment and business with his slogan "Haiti is Open for Business". Perhaps one of the more major contributions made for the revitalization of the Haitian economy was their push for tourists. Minister of Tourism, Stéphanie Villedrouin, embarked on various competitive tourist projects, including the development of Ile-a-Vache, Jacmel, the north, south-west, and Cotes-des-Arcadins. Tourism had risen significantly between 2012 and 2016. On 8 February 2016, Michel Martelly stepped down at the end of his term without a successor in place.

=== Moïse presidency (2017–2021) ===
Jovenel Moïse

Following Hurricane Mathew, Jovenel Moïse was chosen to succeed Martelly as president in an election that has been described by activists as an "electoral coup d'etat." The United States supervised the elections and spent upwards of $33 million on them, spending which has been criticized for its inefficiency, with high overhead costs but little done to stop the widespread fraud, violence, and voter suppression present. Moïse was inaugurated on the grounds where the national palace had been on 7 February 2017. He went on to start the "Caravan de Changement" project, which aims to revitalize the industries and infrastructure of Haiti's less popular areas. However, the actual impact of these efforts is debated. In recent months, Moïse has been implicated in the embezzlement of funds from the PetroCaribe program, as has his predecessor, Martelly.

On 7 July 2018, protests led by opposition politician Jean-Charles Moïse began, demanding the resignation of Jovenel Moïse. Released in November 2017, a Senate probe of the period 2008–2016 (concerning the René Préval and Michel Martelly administrations, as well as the chief of staff of then-sitting President Jovenel Moïse) revealed significant corruption had been funded with Venezuelan loans through the Petrocaribe program. Significant protests broke out in February 2019 following a report from the court investigating the Petrocaribe Senate probe.

A new round of protests broke out in February 2021 amid a dispute over Moïse's presidential term. The protesters claim that Moïse's term officially ended on 7 February 2021 and demanded that he step down. Moïse, however, claimed that he has one more year to serve because of delays in starting his term. Protesters have also expressed concerns about a referendum proposed by Moïse, which would reportedly scrap the ban on consecutive presidential terms and enable Moïse to run again.

On 7 July 2021, President Moïse was assassinated.

=== Henry prime ministership (2021-2024) ===
Ariel Henry served as acting prime minister from 20 July 2021 and 24 April 2024.

==== 2021 earthquake ====
On 14 August 2021, a strong 7.2 earthquake occurred in Haiti. The earthquake spawned tsunami warnings on the Haitian Coast. The warning was cancelled later that day. The death toll from the quake as of 15 August 2021 is 1,419 people.

==== Gang violence ====
On 7 July 2022, massive clashes between two rival gangs began in Cité Soleil, an impoverished and densely populated neighborhood of Port-au-Prince. Thousands of families had to hide inside their homes, unable to get food or water; dozens of residents were killed by stray bullets. A week of gang violence left at least 89 people dead. Since an oil terminal that supplies the capital and all of northern Haiti is located in Cite Soleil, the clashes had a devastating effect on the region's economy.

On 11 October 2022, Henry and his cabinet requested the deployment of foreign troops to oppose the gangs and anti-government demonstrations in Port-au-Prince. On 15 October, the United States and Canada sent armored vehicles and military equipment to aid the Haitian government.

On 2 March 2024, gangs attacked two prisons in Haiti, including the country's largest penitentiary, and allowed prisoners to escape. This was a part of a wave of attacks that the gangs carried out while prime minister Henry traveled to Kenya to finalize an agreement under which that country would send 1,000 police officers to help restore order to Haiti. The goal of the gangs, according to Jimmy Chérizier, a gang leader known as Barbecue, is to overthrow what remains of the government.

On 4 March, armed gangs attacked the heavily fortified Toussaint Louverture International Airport, exchanging gunfire with police and the Haitian Armed Forces in an attempt to take control of the facility after rumors that Henry would return to the country, fueling speculation that an alliance between rival gangs is forming to overthrow the Haitian elite.

On 12 March, prime minister Ariel Henry said that he would resign when a transitional presidential council was created. On 25 April 2024, as the Transitional Presidential Council was sworn in, he presented his resignation in a letter signed on 24 April in Los Angeles. Henry's outgoing Cabinet appointed Economy and Finance Minister Michel Patrick Boisvert as acting prime minister.

== See also ==
- France–Haiti relations
- Haiti–United States relations
- External debt of Haiti
- Haitian Americans
- French colonization of the Americas
- Afro-Haitians
- Little Haiti, Brooklyn
- History of the Americas
- History of the Caribbean
- Americans in Haiti
- History of the Dominican Republic
- History of Latin America
- History of North America
- List of heads of state of Haiti
- Parsley Massacre—Trujillo's Massacre of Haitians
- Politics of Haiti
- Polish Haitians
- Spanish colonization of the Americas
- Timeline of Haitian history
- United States occupation of Haiti
- 2018–2019 Haitian protests
- 2020 Royal Chapel of Milot fire
