= Démosthènes Pétrus Calixte =

Haitian politician

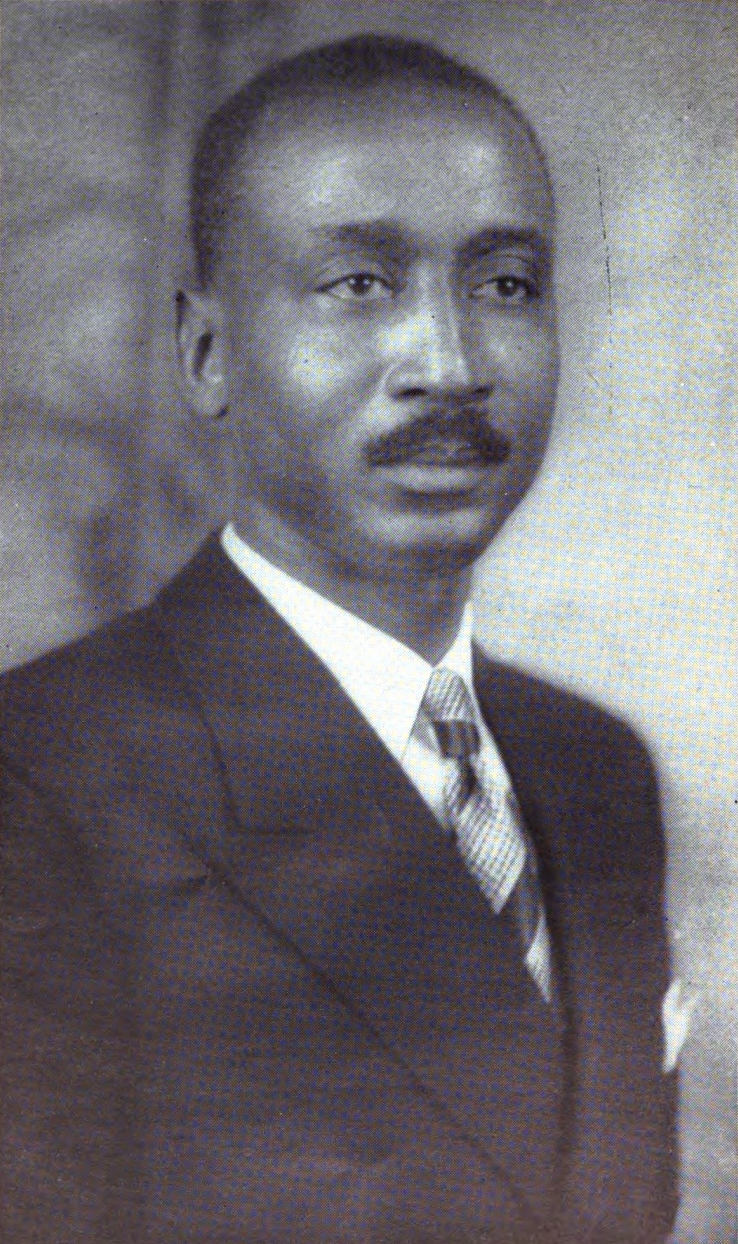
Colonel Démosthènes Pétrus Calixte in 1939.

Démosthènes Pétrus Calixte (c. 1899 – 7 December 1970) was a Haitian conservative Noirist politician and military figure who led the Garde d'Haïti. In 1937, Calixte became involved in political chaos, where officers within the Garde tried to overthrow president Sténio Vincent and replace him with Calixte. This led to the replacement of Calixte, who fled to the Dominican Republic. Upon his return in the 1940s, Calixte was made a presidential candidate by the Mouvement Ouvriers et Paysans in 1946. However, he lost the election to Dumarsais Estimé.

== Career in the Garde ==
Calixte signed onto the Garde d'Haïti in 1915 as a private, rising in the ranks until he reached the rank of major. During his military career, he trained under the United States Marine Corps (USMC). As a major in December 1930, the US gave him one out of the five military departments of the Garde as part of the process of Haitianization within the Garde, as they were withdrawing from their occupation of Haiti. On 1 August 1934, LtCol Clayton B. Vogel of the USMC fully transferred power over the Garde to Calixte, then a colonel. Calixte played a part in the assassinations of other military officers. Following the Parsley massacre of 1937, Calixte was falsely implied in a plot to overthrow president Sténio Vincent, as many officers had disagreed on the official Haitian reaction to the massacre and wanted to replace Vincent with Calixte. This ended in Calixte's dismissal by Vincent in 1938 and his replacement with Jules André, a chief of the Garde chosen directly by Vincent. Less than a year later, Calixte escaped to France and then the Dominican Republic.

== Exile in the Dominican Republic ==
During Calixte's exile in the Dominican Republic, he built up a close relationship with its president, Rafael Trujillo. Calixte was also respected by Dominican border guards, who were known for being anti-Haiti. In 1940, Calixte supported himself being a dupe for Trujillo for a place in the government of Élie Lescot. Trujillo, in trying to manipulate Haitian politics, put anti-Lescot messages in some media and supported a Calixte candidacy. However, following the military coup by Franck Lavaud, Trujillo abandoned his political support of Calixte.

== Return to Haiti ==
In 1946, the Mouvement Ouvriers et Paysans (MOP) backed the recently returned Calixte as a candidate for the presidency of Haiti as a replacement for Daniel Fignolé, banking on the idea that he was popular both in the north and the south, and that the Fignolist popularity in Port-au-Prince would carry the MOP to victory. Calixte had a stronger personality than his counterpart in the race for nomination by the MOP, François Duvalier. However, radicals on the left disagreed with the choice, pointing to Calixte's involvement with the US Marines, former president Sténio Vincent, and Dominican president Trujillo. Eventually, Calixte won six votes, as opposed to the 25 votes won by the winner, Dumarsais Estimé.

Upon Estimé's election, in fear of being imprisoned, Calixte contacted US ambassador to Haiti Orme Wilson Jr. for asylum. He then publicly declared that he supported the election of Estimé, as he was a "personal friend". Estimé made Calixte the inspector general of diplomatic posts in Europe, and thus Calixte moved to Paris. In 1952, Calixte was the ambassador to Spain.

Military offices
Preceded by Position established	Commander-in-Chief of the Garde d'Haïti; 1934–1938	Succeeded by Jules André
