= Movement for the Organization of the Country =

Movement for the Organization of the Country Mouvement pour l'Organisation du Pays
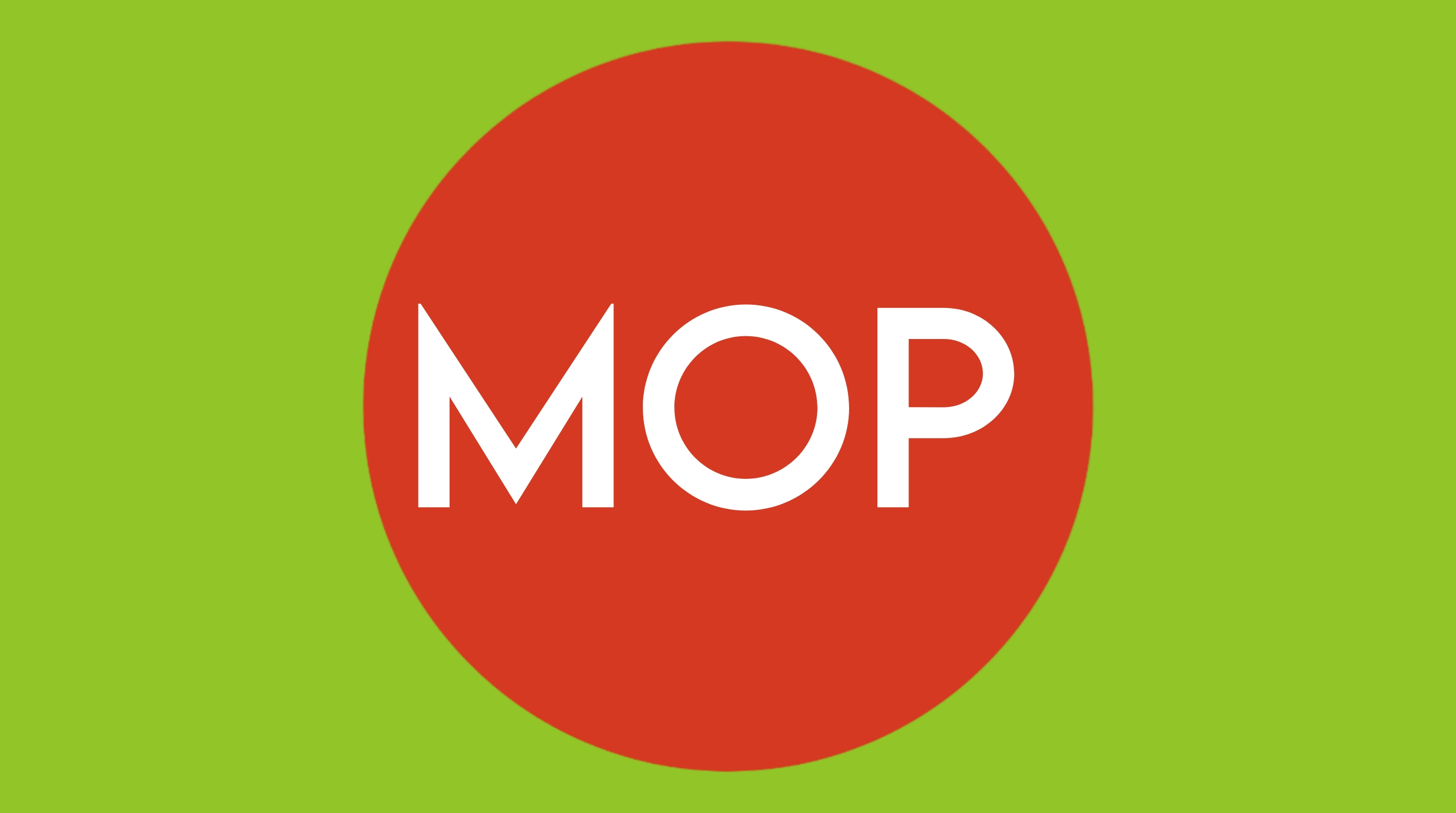
- Abbreviation: MOP
- Leader: Greger Jean-Louis
- Founder: Daniel Fignolé
- Founded: 13 May 1946
- Ideology: Fignolism; Noirism; Socialism; Feminism; Left-wing populism Historical: Pro-New Deal policies
- Political position: Left-wing
- Colours: Green Red

The Movement for the Organization of the Country (French: Mouvement pour l'Organisation du Pays, MOP) is a political party in Haiti, founded by Daniel Fignolé in 1946 as the Peasant Worker Movement (French: Mouvement Ouvrier Paysan).

== History ==
=== Organization and ideology ===
Fignolé's MOP became the most organized labor movement in Haitian history, as well as the largest political organization in the pre-Duvalier period. Alexander states that MOP membership reached its peak during the 1946-1950 period, with approximately 5,000 members. The party's ideology is defined as a mixture of socialist and négritude principles, with a populist and anti-elitist approach. Fignolé's MOP could mobilize a crowd of supporters known as a rouleau compresseur, sometimes used to spread terror against its opponents.

The oficial organ of the MOP was Chantiers, a newspaper that promoted the party's program. The MOP also had other publications, including La Famille, a party paper focused on issues such as parental guidance, gender questions, and child rearing.

The MOP openly supported women's rights in Haiti, establishing in 1948 a section called Bureau d'Action Féminine, the women's wing of the party led by Carmen Jean-François Fignolé.

The flag of the MOP features a green background with a red sphere centered. Green represents the Haitian people's hope for justice, while red symbolizes the blood of all historical leaders who sacrificed their lives for the people's struggle.

=== In politics ===
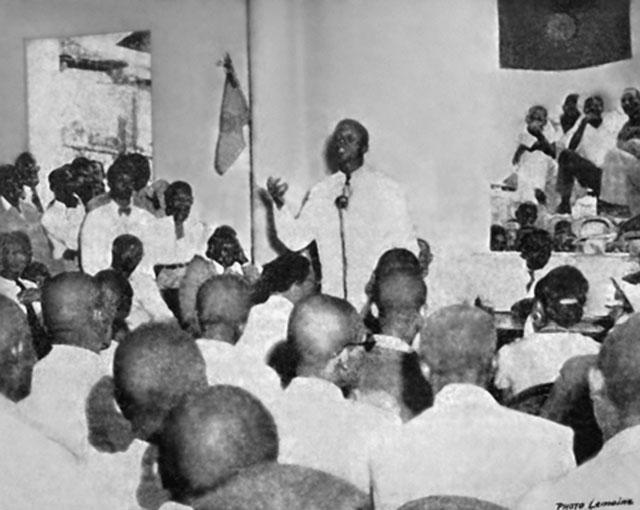
Daniel Fignolé speaking to supporters at Institut Mopique (1947)

The MOP was officially formed as a political party on 13 May 1946, and its founders were Daniel Fignolé, a teacher; François Duvalier, a physician; and Clovis Désinor, an economist. According to Smith, the MOP initials originated from an English word, implying 'sweeping out of the old order in Haitian politics', later becoming an acronym for Mouvement Ouvrier Paysan. The Mouvement Ouvrier Paysan aimed to unite urban and rural workers, as well as small peasants, into a single party. The MOP's initial core group consisted of Fignolé's supporters, including his former students, along with political figures like Lorimer Denis.

The MOP party was part of the Haiti's new political forces that emerged in the wake of the Revolution of 1946. Its leader, Daniel Fignolé, was unable to run in the 1946 presidential election because he was too young for the position of president. Eventually, the MOP party joined forces with a progressive coalition and supported the candidacy of Démosthènes Pétrus Calixte, a former Garde commander implicated in a plot to overthrow Vincent's government. A joint statement by Fignolé, Duvalier and Désinor confirmed Calixte as the 'only candidate acceptable' to the MOP. The presidential race was led by Dumarsais Estimé with 25 votes, while Edgar Numa (PSP) secured 7 votes and Démosthènes Calixte (MOP) garnered 6 votes. Estimé won easily with a plurality of votes in the second round.

A coalition cabinet was initially established by the Estimé administration to appease Haiti's political factions. The MOP integrated Estimé's cabinet, with Fignolé as Education Minister. The PSP also joined, with Georges Rigaud, a mulatto politician, appointed Commerce Minister. During his brief stint in Estimé's cabinet, Fignolé used his position to establish the MOP as a 'well-tuned and formidable force' - later resigning in October 1946 after disagreements with Rigaud.

Since late 1946, the MOP became the main opposition force to Estimé's regime. The MOP underwent a significant split in 1947, sparked by Fignolé's approach toward the Estimé government, leading to Duvalier and Denis's exit from the party. After leaving the MOP, Duvalier held government positions in the Estimé administration, including Under Secretary of Labor (1948) and Minister of Public Health and Labor (1949). A new MOP bureau was formed in 1948 following the split, with Fignolé remaining as party president and featuring Michel Roumain and Arnold Hérard.

In 1949, the MOP joined forces with other democratic groups to oppose Estimé's attempt to revise the constitution to allow his re-election. A constitutional crisis arose from the proposed amendments, resulting in Estimé's removal by a military coup in May 1950. The MOP supported Paul Magloire as presidential candidate in the October elections, securing a 99% victory over Estimist candidate Fénélon Alphonse. Daniel Fignolé also won a seat in the Haitian parliament that year. The MOP-Magloire alliance had a brief existence. On December 30, 1950, the Magloire government banned the MOP, citing its alleged communist affiliations and dangerous maneuvers as justification.

According to Smith, Magloire as president sought to "eliminate all forms of radicalism". In the face of increasing anti-radicalism, Fignolé reconsidered some of his earlier political positions, beginning to present himself as a "National-Democrat" in 1952. Based on the MOP, Fignolé formed a new party called the Great National Democratic Party (French: Grand Parti National Démocrate). Its ideology was anti-communist, pro-labor and opposed to dictatorial policies. Despite Fignolé's attempt to create a new party, the MOP's successor continued to face problems at the hands of the Magloire regime. In the 1955 parliamentary elections, rigged by Magloire, Fignolé lost his seat in the Chamber of Deputies after running for re-election as a deputy.

After Magloire's overthrow in the 1956 Haitian protest movement, the MOP experienced a brief revival during the 1957 crisis. Fignolé reformed the party and, in 1956, renamed it to Mouvement Organisation du Pays, representing a less militant direction. As the 1957 presidential candidate, Fignolé accepted the provisional presidency following May's political unrest. Fignolé's presidency lasted only nineteen days, ending abruptly when Antonio Kébreau's military coup forced him into exile in June.

The Kébreau junta, besides imposing other authoritarian measures like a ban on strikes, outlawed the MOP party. The Haitian army held a contentious election months later, disqualifying Fignolé as a candidate and securing Duvalier's victory amid allegations of fraud. Under the Duvalier regime, the remaining MOP supporters were subjected to persecution and elimination. Following his overthrow, Fignolé, in exile, became an active actor in the opposition to the Duvalier regime. After 29 years in exile, Fignolé returned to Haiti in 1986, but died shortly afterward.

The MOP was revitalized under Gérard Philippe Auguste's leadership, registering on October 22, 1986, and gaining official recognition as a political party in April 1987. Its leader, Philippe Auguste, came third in the 1988 presidential election, but later joined Manigat's government as minister. These events led to a split within the party. The MOP's split resulted in two internal factions: one linked to the opposition to Jean-Bertrand Aristide, led by Philippe Auguste and Franck Adelson, and another associated with the Lavalas movement, led by Gesner Comeau and Jean Molière. At the October 1989 Party Congress, Greger Jean-Louis was elected the new leader of the MOP by the Bel Air branch.

In August 1989, the MOP joined forces with MDN and PAIN to form an electoral alliance for the forthcoming elections. The MOP-MDN-PAIN coalition was one of the political forces that protested against the case known as the "Prisoners of All Saints' Day". In a press statement, the coalition demanded the prisoners' release by the government of Prosper Avril. During the 1990 Haitian protest movement, the MOP joined an 11-party coalition to negotiate Avril's resignation and establish a provisional government, led by a Supreme Court member and advised by a Council of State. During Aristide's first term (1991), the MOP, through Ernst Pedro Casséus, held the presidency of the Chamber of Deputies in the 45th Legislature. In the 1995 general elections, the MOP joined the Lavalas Political Platform, a coalition with the OPL and PLB. The MOP, despite its pro-Lavalas minority faction, acted as an opposition party during Aristide's second term (2001–2004), as evidenced by Secretary-General Franck Adelson's 2002 call for President Aristide's resignation.

== Electoral history ==
=== Presidential elections ===
Election	Party candidate	Votes	%	Result
1946	Démosthènes Pétrus Calixte	6	Unknown	Lost ✗
1950	Paul Magloire	527,625	99%	Elected ✓
1988	Gérard Philippe Auguste	151,391	14,30%	Lost ✗
