= Mulatto Haitians =

Haitians of mixed-race descent

Mulatto Haitians (French: mulâtre; Haitian Creole: milat) are Haitians of mixed white European and Black African descent. As of 2016, people of Mulatto or white descent constitute a minority of 5 percent of the Haitian population. The designation of Mulatto is contested in popular and academic use, as it can refer strictly to mixed-race Haitians and also the traditionally Mulatto Haitian elite. Some modern scholars prefer the Kreyòl term Milat to refer to the Mulatto Haitian elite specifically.

== Nomenclature and use ==
According to legend, the colors of the Haitian flag represent Blacks (blue) and Mulattoes (red).

While the term Mulatto, borrowed from Spanish and Portuguese, refers to a person of mixed white European and Black African ancestry generally, the term is also often used to refer to the light-skinned Haitian elite in particular. Its use in this latter sense is contested by academics; Matthew J. Smith suggests the term "acknowledges phenotype but does not necessarily refer to social status". A multiplicity of terms are used in Haitian Creole to refer to light-skinned people beyond Mulatto, such as Griffe, Marabou, Métif, and Quarteronné. Individuals may be perceived as Mulatto based on sociocultural factors and physical characteristics, such as their skin color, the texture of their hair and skin, and their facial features. Additionally, due to the demographic dominance of Black Haitians, Mulatto identity has shifted: many persons who may be considered Mulattoes in the 21st century would be considered firmly Black in 1791.

Given the nuances of Mulatto identity, some contemporary authors prefer to use the Kreyòl Milat to refer specifically to the mixed-race Haitian elite. Matthew Smith invokes a quote attributed to Jean-Jacques Acaau, the Black leader of the Piquet Rebellion of 1843 to illustrate the class element of the term: "Nèg rich se Milat, Milat pòv se Nèg" (lit. 'A rich Black is a Milat, a poor Milat is a Negro').

While the divide between Mulattoes and Black Haitians has been widely discussed in academic sources, the subject is often considered taboo in Haitian politics. In 1845, President Jean-Louis Pierrot, a Black general perceived as a figurehead of the Mulatto elite, introduced a "Race Relations Act" that criminalized "idle talk about color likely to spread dissension among Haitians and provoke one against another". In the late-19th century, when a racially polarized two-party system emerged, Mulatto politicians justified their control of the state by claiming the divide was one of competence, not race: Edmond Paul, an ideologue of the largely Mulatto Liberal Party, made its slogan "power for those most capable" (as opposed to the Black-interest National Party's slogan of "the greatest good for the greatest number"). Denial of the "color line" is, however, a minority viewpoint among scholars of race in Haiti. For instance, Jacqueline Lamartiniere called the concept of a firm color line "metaphysical sophistry".

As Mulatto predominance in Haitian society could easily be attacked as analogous to the pre-revolutionary white supremacy practiced on Saint-Domingue by Black Haitians, Mulatto elites were extremely cautious with regards to the invocation of any formalized racial hierarchy, and often professed a paternalistic "respect" for the culture of the majority (with the notable exception of Vodou, which was long frowned-upon). Ultimately, while the "color question" has long undergirded politics and governance in Haiti, the divide between Haitian Mulattoes and Blacks is not directly analogous to race relations in places with a sharper "color line", such as the United States or South Africa.

== History ==
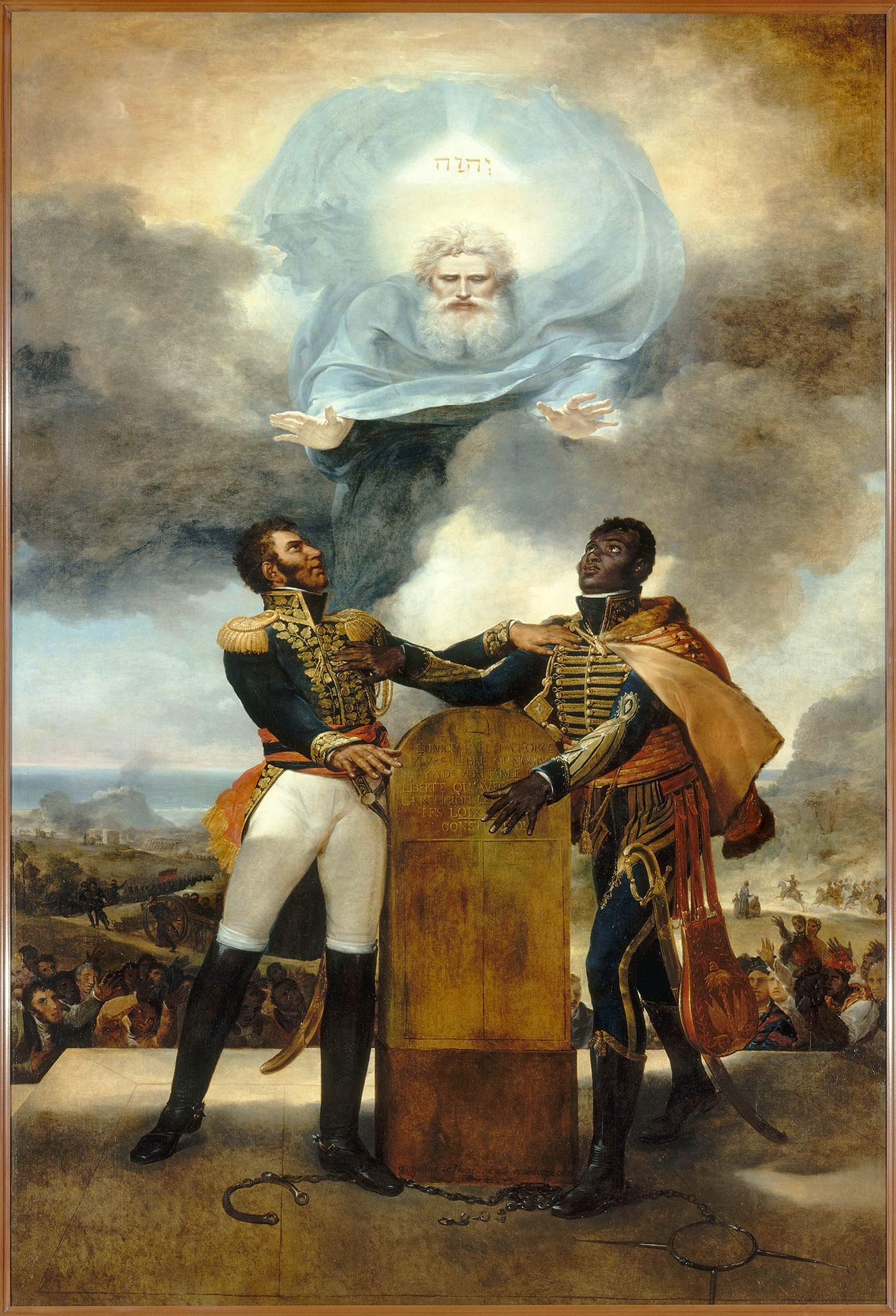
The Oath of the Ancestors, a painting by mixed-race French artist Guillaume Guillon-Lethière, symbolizes the union of Haiti's Mulatto and Black populations through a meeting between Alexandre Pétion and Jean-Jacques Dessalines.

Mulatto people in Haiti, who were definitionally Saint-Domingue Creoles due to their birth on the island of Hispaniola, first arose when white French slavers raped enslaved Black women in Saint-Domingue in the second half of the 17th century. Many were freed by their fathers at birth, while others bought their freedom. At the time of the Haitian Revolution, identification as Mulatto was often synonymous with the class of gens de couleur libres (lit. 'free people of color'). When free, Mulattoes occupied a privileged position relative to the enslaved Black majority. In the French territory's racial hierarchies, lighter skin was positioned above Black skin, and Mulattoes were thus viewed as more virtuous than Black people. Mulattoes often worked as artisans, plantation managers, and soldiers, and tended to be at least minimally educated and literate. Some Mulatto Creoles, including some of the most notable figures in early Haitian history, were sent to France to study or perform apprenticeships. An important forerunner to the outbreak of the Haitian Revolution was the abortive rebellion of Vincent Ogé, who was executed after demanding the right to a vote for gens de coleur in 1790. Deep fissures existed between Mulattoes (numbering 27,000 in 1789) and Black slaves (numbering 500,000 in the same year), and the groups clashed in the first decade of the Haitian Revolution. Due to their smaller numbers, Mulattoes suffered disproportionate casualties, and some fled upon the victory of the enslaved faction. However, many Mulattoes—including notable figures such as Alexandre Pétion, André Rigaud, and Jean-Pierre Boyer—eventually aligned themselves with the Black revolutionaries after it became clear that a recapture of Saint-Domingue by Napoleonic France would lead not only to the reestablishment of slavery, but also a curtailing of the rights of gens de couleur.

After the French were expelled, Jean-Jacques Dessalines, a Black ex-slave, became the first leader of an independent Haiti in 1804. Mulatto discontent with his rule resulted in his 1806 assassination and the establishment of a northern state ruled by ex-slaves (the State and later Kingdom of Haiti) and a southern one ruled by Mulattoes (the Republic of Haiti). Mulatto governance did not, however, herald a return of white supremacy; Pétion and Boyer kept the law ensuring automatic Black citizenship in place, and provided ample assistance to anti-slavery forces in the Americas. Regardless, partition ended with the victory of the Mulatto faction under Jean-Pierre Boyer in 1820. This victory heralded the beginning of a lengthy period of Mulatto domination in Haitian politics and society, whereby Mulattoes often controlled the levers of state and trade while the overwhelming majority of Black Haitians remained agricultural laborers. Mulatto ranks were reinforced by the immigration of mixed-race people from the United States, Cuba, Martinique, and elsewhere throughout the first half of the 19th century.

Under President Boyer, the stagnation of the economy sharpened the lines between Mulatto and Black Haitians, with the Mulatto establishment becoming the undisputed elite of the republic. Black Haitians chafed under the decades of Mulatto rule under Boyer, necessitating the establishment of a tactic dubbed politique de doublure lit. 'politics of the understudy', whereby Black figureheads were installed as leaders with Mulatto sponsorship, often for very brief and tumultuous terms. The first such "understudy" was Philippe Guerrier. The system of politique de doublure mostly endured, with a notable interruption under the rule of Faustin Soulouque (1847–59), until the beginning of the US occupation of Haiti in 1915. Conflict continued to define relations between Mulattoes and Black Haitians, particularly in the form of piquets and later cacos, rural Black smallholders and tenants who periodically rose up in rebellion against the central, Mulatto-dominated state. After 1867, a two-party system emerged along color lines, with a Liberal Party mostly representing the Mulatto elite and a National Party that aligned itself with the Black majority. Under US occupation, Mulatto power became retrenched, with Philippe Sudré Dartiguenave the first in an unbroken line of Mulatto presidents, replacing politique de doublure with a visible American preference for light-skinned rule. Nevertheless, Mulattoes and Blacks both faced paternalism and racism from the occupying Marines due to the US' one drop rule, and so the Mulattoes also came to resent the occupation.

The American occupation became a catalyst for a sea-change in Haitian race relations. Its administrative demands resulted in a slight influx of Black professionals into the traditionally Mulatto domain of governance in Port-au-Prince, which in turn planted the seeds of a Black middle class. New entrants into Haiti's ruling quarters took note of, and fervently criticized, Mulatto reference to European culture and denigration of Black peasant culture. Prominent figures who emerged from this generation include Jean Price-Mars, who became a pioneer of indigenisme and noirisme. The occupation also created the Gendarmerie of Haiti, which became the Garde d'Haïti upon the departure of US forces. The Garde, a professionalized military force which would become the Haitian army, was majority-Black, but dominated by Mulatto officers. In 1946, Black elements of the Garde, inspired by the new intellectual elevation of Black Haitian culture, overthrew Élie Lescot, a Mulatto promoted under the American occupation and friendly with Dominican dictator Rafael Trujillo, inaugurating a period of Black ascendancy in Haitian politics. Dumarsais Estimé, who would succeed the Black junta, established himself as the candidate of the growing Black middle class, and promoted Black culture, such as Haitian Vodou, as a viable part of Haitian society in opposition to the Catholic Mulatto elite.

After Estimé's fall and the brief rule of Paul Magloire, Mulatto candidate Louis Déjoie was decisively defeated by the populist, Black former minister of labor, François Duvalier. Duvalier was an avowed enemy of the Mulatto elite, and promoted négritude, an ideology promoting Haiti's Black peasant heritage and culture over the Europeanized culture of the Mulatto elite (Duvalier was particularly well-known for his use of Vodou). Despite this, he married a Mulatto, Simone Duvalier, and official policy toward the Mulatto elite under "Papa Doc" reflected antipathy more than persecution or hatred. Nonetheless, Duvalier championed the Black middle class, precipitating the introduction of Black Haitians into the country's upper class as a rival elite, and thus disrupted the highly calcified Haitian class system. Duvalier's son, Jean-Claude, also married a Mulatto, Michèle Bennett, and his technocratic administration shied away from the more pro-Black policies of his father.

The salience of Mulattoes in Haiti as an exclusive, distinct, and elite class has been challenged by the entry of Black Haitians into the Haitian upper class since the end of the American occupation. Nevertheless, Mulattoes remain prominent in Haitian society: recent Mulatto heads of state include Raoul Cédras and Michel Martelly. Additionally, racial conflict remains a fixture of Haitian politics: Martine Moïse eulogized her slain husband as a fighter against the "Mulatto oligarchy", while others classified President Moïse as yet another Black "understudy" chosen by President Martelly. Alix Didier Fils-Aimé and Laurent Saint-Cyr, who emerged as leaders from the unrest following Moïse's death, are also Mulattoes.

== Culture ==
Given their elite status within Haiti, Mulattoes long held and, to a certain extent, continue to hold predominance within Haitian high culture. The sociocultural considerations of Mulatto identity bear heavily on a perceived proximity to European whiteness. For much of its history, the Mulatto ruling class professed strict adherence to Catholic orthodoxy, denigrating the Vodou frequently practiced among the Black majority. Proper command of the French language was, and remains, a crucial shibboleth among Haiti's elite class, given the predominant use of kreyòl among Black Haitians. The esteem in which Mulatto elites hold European culture, however, was not an explicit indication of white supremacist sentiments, and elite cultural production has frequently referenced Black culture and mores. Moreover, given their own proximity to Blackness, Mulatto elites elevated the perceived "natural and human warmth" which they experienced in Haiti, particularly if they lived or studied abroad.

Endogamy is frequent among self-identifying Mulattoes. As marrying whites was illegal until 1825, and white immigration thereafter was extremely rare, Mulatto families self-selected for phenotypically Mulatto traits. Their ranks were supplemented by intermarriage with the small number of white merchants (often German or Scandinavian) who arrived in Haiti after 1825, and, by the 1990s, intermarriage with Arab Haitians. Despite the shifting phenotypical criteria of Mulatto identity, 5% of the Haitian population identifies as Mulatto, a figure relatively unchanged from the time of independence. A historical exception to this endogamy can be observed in Haiti's north, where Henri Christophe's promotion of a Black military aristocracy resulted in a great number of unions between Black men and Mulatto women. However, according to Michel-Rolph Trouillot, this exception ended soon after it began, as Henri Christophe's landed aristocracy was quickly outcompeted by still-endogamous Mulatto dominance in trade. For the rest of the 19th century, the endogamous Mulatto elite coexisted in a "shifting, uneasy alliance" with the Black officer class; this pattern only began to break down with the development of the Black middle class in the early 20th century.

== See also ==
- Affranchi
- Gens de couleur
- Free people of color
- Afro-Haitians
- White Haitians
- Marabou
- Mulatto
- Noirism
- Passing (racial identity)
- Creole peoples
- Social class in Haiti
