= List of revolutions and coups d'état in Haiti =

This article lists successful revolutions and coups d'état that have taken place in the history of Haiti:

== 18th century ==
- 1791 onward: Emergence of the State of Haiti; independence proclaimed in 1804 as a consequence of the Haitian Revolution and the disestablishment of the French colony of Saint-Domingue.

== 19th century ==
- 8 October 1820: Suicide of King Henri Christophe.
- 13 February 1843: Deposition of President for life Jean-Pierre Boyer.
- 15 January 1859: Deposition of Emperor Faustin Soulouque.
- 15 April 1876: Deposition of President Michel Domingue.
- 10 August 1888: Deposition of President Lysius Salomon.

== 20th century ==
- 2 December 1908: Deposition of President for life Pierre Nord Alexis.
- 28 July 1915: Deposition and murder of President Vilbrun Guillaume Sam, triggering the U.S. occupation.
- 11 January 1946: Deposition of president Élie Lescot (Revolution of 1946)
- 10 May 1950: Deposition of president Dumarsais Estimé (1950 Haitian coup d'état)
- June 14, 1957: Deposition of Daniel Fignolé.
- 7 February 1986: Deposition of President for life Jean-Claude Duvalier (climax of the Anti-Duvalier protest movement).
- 20 June 1988: Deposition of President Leslie Manigat (June 1988 coup d'état).
- 18 September 1988: Deposition of President Henri Namphy (September 1988 coup d'état).
- 29 September 1991: First deposition of President Jean-Bertrand Aristide (1991 coup d'état).

== 21st century ==
- 5–29 February 2004: Second deposition of President Jean-Bertrand Aristide (2004 coup d'état).
- 7 July 2021: Assassination of President Jovenel Moïse
- 24 April 2024: Acting Prime Minister of Haiti Ariel Henry, unable to return to the country after an international trip due to widespread gang violence, is forced to resign.

== See also ==
- List of coups d'état and coup attempts
- List of coups d'état and coup attempts by country
- Assassination of Jovenel Moïse
