= List of ambassadors of the Republic of China to Haiti =

Coordinates: 18.507880°N 72.287607°W

Taiwanese Ambassador to Haiti
- Incumbent; Hu Zheng-hao since 1 May 2017
- Inaugural holder: Tan Pao-tuan
- Formation: 1 July 1956; 70 years ago

The Taiwanese Ambassador to Haiti is the official representative of the Republic of China to the Republic of Haiti.

== List of representatives ==
Start date	Ambassador	Chinese language zh:中華民國駐海地大使列表	Notes	Premier of the Republic of China	Head of state of Haiti	End date
April 25, 1956			The governments in Port-au-Prince and Taipei established diplomatic relations.	Yu Hung-Chun	Paul Eugène Magloire	
July 1, 1956	Tan Pao-tuan	谭葆瑞	With residence in Havana.	Yu Hung-Chun	Paul Eugène Magloire	March 1, 1957
August 1, 1957	Liu Yu-wan	zh:刘驭万	With residence in Havana. Died of a heart attack in Bangkok on June 7, 1966.	Yu Hung-Chun	Antonio Thrasybule Kebreau	June 1, 1966
September 7, 1965			The mission was upgraded to an embassy.	Yen Chia-kan	François Duvalier	
October 1, 1966	Kao Shih-ming	高士铭		Yen Chia-kan	François Duvalier	August 1, 1972
September 1, 1972	Chiang Hsi-ling	江锡(鹿各)		Chiang Ching-kuo	Jean-Claude Duvalier	July 1, 1976
September 1, 1976	Li Nan-hsing	李南兴		Chiang Ching-kuo	Jean-Claude Duvalier	November 1, 1996
November 1, 1996	Chiou Jong-nan	邱荣男		Lien Chan	René Préval	August 1, 2000
April 1, 2001	Michel Ching-long Lu	zh:吕庆龙	Van Fan interpreter of Cape No. 7 and Michel Ching-long Lu Taipei Economic and Cultural Representative Office Paris.	Tang Fei	Jean-Bertrand Aristide	March 1, 2003
March 1, 2003	Hsieh Hsin-ping	谢新平		Yu Shyi-kun	Jean-Bertrand Aristide	January 1, 2005
January 1, 2005	Yang Cheng-ta	杨承达		Hsieh Chang-ting	Boniface Alexandre	April 1, 2008
April 1, 2008	Hsu Mien-sheng	徐勉生	Broke his leg in the January 12 2010 Haiti earthquake and was flown to the neighboring Dominican Republic.	Liu Chao-shiuan	René Préval	June 1, 2010
June 1, 2010	Bang-Zyh Liu	刘邦治		Wu Den-yih	René Préval	February 1, 2014
February 1, 2014	Peter Hwang	黃再求		Jiang Yi-huah	Michel Martelly	May 1, 2017
May 1, 2017	Hu Zheng-hao	胡正浩		Lin Chuan	Michel Martelly	
