= Lorimer Denis =

Jean-Joseph Lorimer Denis (1904-1957), known commonly as just Lorimer Denis, was a Haitian Indigenist ethnologist and theorist of the noirist movement. He was an associate of Haitian leader François Duvalier, with whom he founded noirism and published the Les Griots journal with from 1938 to 1940.

== Life ==
Jean-Joseph Lorimer Denis was born in 1904 in Cap-Haïtien to a senator. He studied law in Port-au-Prince, becoming an avocat in 1929.

Lorimer began his association with later Haitian leader François Duvalier during Duvalier's teenage years, when they met as ethnology enthusiasts. At the time, Lorimer was an Africanist studying Voudoun under Jean Price-Mars. Along with Louis Diaquoi, they founded a group named the Trois D in 1929 and one named Les Griots in 1932, named after a West African word for a bard. They theorized that culture and psychology was determined by race. Upon Duvalier's return to Haiti from the United States, Lorimer introduced him to Daniel Fignolé and convinced him to join the Mouvement Ouvriers et Paysans (MOP), a political party. In 1946, Lorimer became one of the founding members of the Parti Populaire National, and began writing a book with Duvalier. In 1948, Duvalier and Lorimer published The Class Problem in Haitian History, in which they posited that the struggle within Haiti was not one based on class but on race.

Lorimer became the assistant director of the Haitian government's Bureau of Ethnology, which he was upon Duvalier's return. From 1946 to his death in 1957, Lorimer was the director of the Bureau.

Lorimer had a notable style, in that he carried a coco macaque cane and wore hats indoors.
