= Noirism =

Haitian political and cultural movement

Noirism (French: Noirisme; Haitian Creole: Nwais) is one of the main political and cultural movements which developed in Haiti after the end of U.S occupation. It built off of the movement which called for greater incorporation of local, Haitian culture into social and political life.

Advocates of Noirism (Blackism), otherwise known as the Noirists, believed that the most basic problem in Haiti is the rule of a minority, mulatto ruling class that uses the state to oppress the black majority and to maintain power. The Noirists played a prominent role in shaping Haitian politics following the left-wing overthrow of President Élie Lescot. Their influence ultimately culminated into the election of Dumarsais Estimé as president in 1946, and the election of François Duvalier as president in 1957. Noirism was then used during the Duvalier era to maintain support and legitimacy during an era of heavy repression.

== Background ==
In response to the occupation which lasted twenty years, intellectuals began to call for a return to local Haitian culture. Individuals such as Jean Price-Mars criticized the elite for their embrace of French and European cultural practices, instead of facets of local culture such as Haitian Vodou and Haitian Creole. The repudiation of Western culture and interest in the country's historical and symbolic relationship with the African continent provided the Noirists with a great influence.

Three young men who were members of the emerging black middle-class, Louis Diaquoi, Lorimer Denis, and Francois Duvalier who were students under Price-Mars formed a small group called the Griots in 1932. After many discussions and gatherings, a quarterly magazine titled Les Griots was published in 1938 with the explicit aim of expanding the movement for the incorporation of local culture. The Noirists believed that the mulatto elite were opposed to the interest of the black majority since they held and acted upon European cultural values which could not apply to Haiti. As a result, the Noirists declared that they were unfit to govern. They also sought to ground the differences in culture in concepts and ideas of a specific African biology and psychology shared by the black diaspora.

Because of this focus on culture and race above all else, the Noirists frequently found themselves in conflict with left-wing groups such as the Haitian Communist Party, which lead the opposition against then president, Sténio Vincent. The Communist Party, adhering to the slogan "Color is nothing, Class is everything", criticised the Noriste's emphasis on race as an attempt to obscure class and to manufacture further division in the country. In response, the Noirists criticised the Communists in two ways: for their attempt to apply a European ideology which they believed was contrary to the African nature of Haitian society, and for their materialist outlooks which they believed to be contrary to the spiritual nature of Haitian society.

The government's repression of Haitian Communist and Socialist gave the Noirists an opportunity to grow and expand out of the intellectual sphere. Events such as the Catholic Church's anti-superstition campaign against Voudou, and the brutal Parsley Massacre carried out by the Dominican government against the Haitians at the border had shaped the national consciousness along racial lines. Public discussions which argued the tenets of Noirism became common, bringing high-profile individuals such as Daniel Fignolé into the movement. Also, a new appreciation for Haiti and folk culture by individuals of the black diaspora such as Aimé Césaire, Zora Neale Hurston, and C. L. R. James served to bolster and legitimize the Noirists' perspective in the eyes of many. Although Noirism was on its way to becoming mainstream, the ideology was not able to completely dominate the political sphere until the overthrow of President Élie Lescot in 1946.

== Mid-twentieth century Haitian politics ==
The overthrow of Lescot led by left-wing Haitian students allowed for the growth of new political parties such as the Parti Populaire National formed by the Noirists. For a time, the Parti Populaire joined the left-wing groups which they had once opposed to form Front Revolutionnaire Haiten. However, this coalition to ensure the election of a radical government in the interest of all Haitians quickly fell apart. Tensions between groups continued to fester, with the Noirists labelling the left-wing groups as defenders of mulatto rule while being labelled as a movement for the emerging black elite.

Nevertheless, the 1946 elections resulted in the election of moderate Noirist, Dumarsais Estimé who wasted no time putting Norisime into practice. All major political offices such as the ambassador to Washington, were headed by educated black men, as opposed to the previous mulatto elite. Francois Duvalier was appointed as Director General of the National Public Health Service. Duvalier and Denis revived Les Griots magazine to celebrate the Estime government as the realization of Noirism in the political sphere, later publishing Le probleme des classes a travers l'historie in 1948, which is considered a landmark work in Noirist thought. Art and music such as vodou-jazz began to explode in popularity, celebrating the new government which was seen as representative of the country's black majority.

But despite his popularity among the Haitian masses, Estime and the new government could not endure the pressure from the mulatto elite which still held considerable influence over the country's affairs. Neither could it endure the looming pressure from the United States Government which continued to watch the country's development in relation to its own interest. Paul Magloire became president after staging a military coup in 1950, marking a quick end to the first black government in Haiti. As a result, the attacks on Voudou religion and culture by the Catholic Church continued, both unhindered and unrestricted. Repression of the left resumed, as Magoloire believed that stability could only be achieved through crushing and silencing dissent. In 1956, Magolorie was forced to flee the country due to popular discontent, and the presidential seat was left vacant once again.

=== Duvalier era (1957–1986) ===
As it did in 1946, Noirism played a crucial part in the 1957 Haitian general election. Duvalier and Fignole, although both Noirists, waged virulent campaigns against each other. Fignole was called accused of being a Communist while Duvalier was accused of aiming to create a dictatorship. Another candidate, Louis Déjoie, a member of the mulatto elite, was called a colon moderne, or a modern colonizer, while accusing the Noirstes of wanting to exterminate mulattos. Violence and unrest came to mark the election in 1957, continuing for a year until through methods of manipulation, terror, and appealing to the popular Estime presidency of the past, it became clear that François Duvalier would be the Haiti's next president.

At first, it seemed as if Duvalier's presidency would result in material gains for the black majority. The 1957 Constitution was the first to refer to Kreyol as a language, and provided it with basic protection under the law. Duvalier also made sure to maintain communication with the Haitian peasantry, demonstrated support among the hougans, or the Voudou priests who were always in conflict with the Catholic Church. However, it was soon apparent that the promises of Noirism, of a society in the interest of Haiti's black majority, would go unfulfilled. Culturally, European traditions and customs continued to dominate society and one's position was always linked to how well they accommodated to such a culture. Economically, concessions continued to be made to American businesses, and the life of the average Haitian in rural and urban areas remained relatively unchanged. Instead of being an era of social mobility for the Haitian masses as was the case during Estime's presidency, Duvalier's tenure became an era known for the violent repression of dissent and high pay and prestige for the new black elite. When Francois Duvalier passed and his son Jean-Claude Duvalier was placed in power, this trend of favoring the elite at the expense of the masses only continued.
