= Carmen Jean-François =

Haitian teacher and First Lady (1922–1992)

First Lady of Haiti
- In role May 1957 – 14 June 1957
- President: Daniel Fignolé
- Preceded by: Dieudonne Auxilus Occide Jeanty
- Succeeded by: Marie Yvonne Charles

Personal details
- Born: 25 March 1922 Thomazeau, Haiti
- Died: 9 June 1992 (aged 70) Montgomery, Maryland
- Party: MOP
- Spouse: Daniel Fignolé (m. 1942; died 1986)
- Children: 7
- Profession: Teacher

Carmen Jean-François (25 March 1922 – 9 June 1992) was a Haitian teacher and political figure, who served as First Lady of Haiti from May to June 1957 as the wife of Haitian president Daniel Fignolé. She led the Women's Wing of the MOP, a political party that her husband had founded. After her husband's presidency was overthrown in a military coup, they lived in exile in the United States.

== Early and personal life ==
Carmen Jean-François was born on 25 March 1922, into a family of coffee traders and had four siblings. According to Carlo A. Désinor, her hometown was Thomazeau. While she was still a child, her father died suddenly, leaving her mother in charge of the business. Her mother paid for her to attend to a French-language communal boarding school in Port-au-Prince when she was around eight. The school had been founded by European nuns, and discouraged traditional Haitian practices and punished the speaking of Haitian Creole. A nun named Marie Natalie took Jean-François under her wing, teaching and encouraging her to pursue a career as a teacher. Although Jean-François originally aspired to become a nun, she ultimately decided to follow a teaching career due to her mother's disapproval. As a teacher, she worked at Collège Notre-Dame du Perpétuel Secours in Bel Air, where she taught Preparatory Course I.

While practicing playing piano at a hair salon in Port-au-Prince in summer 1941, she met fellow teacher Daniel Fignolé, and soon began courting. Her mother disapproved of the match, believing that Fignolé wanted to use her to improve his own status, and instead wanted her to marry Gérard Jolibois. Jean-François however insisted on marrying Fignolé, and the two wed in September 1942 in Thomazeau. After the wedding, the two moved in with Jean-François' brother. The couple had seven children together, five daughters and two sons.

== Political career ==
In the 1940s, her husband emerged as a prominent figure in Haitian politics, founding the Haitian labor party Mouvement Ouvrier Paysan (MOP). The party advocated for women's rights, with Jean-François leading its female wing, officially named the Bureau d'Action Féminine, established in 1948. She also directed La Famille, a MOP's journal that focused on family issues, including parental guidance, gender questions, and child rearing.

Following the end of President Paul Magloire's tenure, a political crisis erupted in Haiti on who would succeed him. As a compromise between the army and politicians, Daniel Fignolé was appointed as provisional president in May 1957, and thus Jean-François became the First Lady. However, Fignolé's tenure lasted just nineteen days, ending abruptly in a military coup orchestrated by General Antonio Kébreau. François Duvalier soon took power and persecuted Fignolé's supporters.

== Exile and later life ==
After the coup, Carmen and Fignolé were accompanied by the Haitian Coast Guard into exile in the United States. The family then lived in Brooklyn. Daniel Fignolé eventually returned to Haiti in 1986 after Duvalier's son Jean-Claude was ousted as president. However, Fignolé died five months later from prostate cancer on 27 August. Carmen Jean-François remained in the United States, died in Montgomery, Maryland on 9 June 1992, at the age of 70.
