= 1950 Haitian coup d'état =

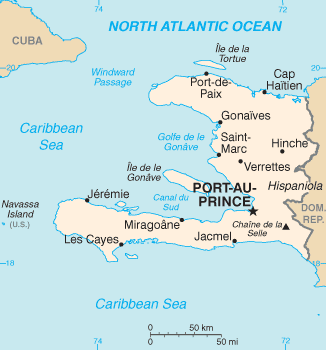
Date	10 May 1950
Location	Haiti
Status	Successful military coup: President Estimé ousted; A three-man junta takes power; Colonel Magloire becomes president after the junta calls elections

Belligerents
Armed Forces of Haiti	(Haiti) Military junta

Commanders and leaders
(Haiti) Henri Namphy	(Haiti) Paul Magloire (Haiti) Franck Lavaud (Haiti) Antoine Levelt

The 1950 Haitian coup d'état was a military overthrow of the president of Haiti Dumarsais Estimé by a three-man junta, the same participants in the 1946 coup d'état. The coup took place on May 10, 1950, as an army intervention whose motives were President Estimé's attempt to extend his term of office and the subsequent political unrest. One of the participants in Estimé's overthrow, Colonel Paul Magloire, became president in the post-coup elections, the first direct elections by popular suffrage in Haiti.

== Bibliography ==
- Smith, Matthew J. (2009). Red & Black in Haiti: Radicalism, Conflict, and Political Change, 1934–1957. University of North Carolina Press.
