= 1955 Haitian parliamentary election =

Parliamentary elections were held in Haiti on 9 January 1955. They were rigged by President Paul Magloire to ensure that Daniel Fignolé (a former leader of the Peasant Worker Movement Party that Magloire had banned) would not be elected to the Chamber of Deputies.

Following the elections, Fignolé was jailed and his Haiti Democratique newspaper was shut down. Magloire also cracked down on institutions he saw as potential sources of dissent, dissolving the Faculty of Medicine and closing schools across the country.
