= Emile Saint-Lot =

Haitian politician, lawyer, and journalist (1904–1976)

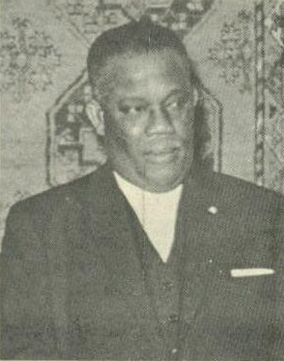

President of Haiti's Senate
- In office 1957–1959
- Preceded by: Charles Fombrun
- Succeeded by: Antoine Marthold

Haitian Minister of Labour, Education, and Public Health
- In office 10 April – 8 December 1947
- President: Dumarsais Estimé
- Preceded by: Jean Price Mars (Education); Georges Honorat (Public Health); Philippe Charlier (Labour)
- Succeeded by: Maurice Laraque (Education and Public Health); Jean P. David (Labour)

Haitian Minister of Labour and Justice
- In office 12 May – 19 August 1950
- President: Franck Lavaud
- Preceded by: François Duvalier (Labour); Castel Démesmin (Justice)
- Succeeded by: Lélio Dalencourt

Personal details
- Born: 11 September 1904 Bel Air, Haiti
- Died: 17 August 1976 (aged 71) New York City

Emile Saint-Lot, also Emile Saint-Lôt (Bel-Air, Haiti 11 September 1904 – 17 August 1976 New-York) was a Haitian politician, lawyer, and journalist.

He held several governmental posts, like minister of Education; Public Health; and Labour (1947), and minister of Labour and Justice (1950).

He served as the first ambassador of Haiti to the United Nations, and a member of the security council responsible for voting on the independence of countries. He was decisive for the independence of Somalia, partition of Palestine, and Libya. As for the latter, he was convinced by Ali Aneizi, member of the Liberation of Libya committee, to vote against Bevin-Sforza Plan, a plan to make the three regions of Libya (Tripolitania, Cyrenaica, Fezzan) under the trusteeship of three countries (Italy, United Kingdom, France respectively). The necessary votes to adopt the plan were never attained as a result of Saint-Lot voting against it.
