= Obas =

Obas may refer to:

== People ==
- Beethova Obas (born 1964), Haitian musician
- Charles Obas, Haitian painter

== Places ==
- Obas District, Peru

== See also ==
- Optical brightening agent
