= 1950 Haitian general election =

- 8 October 1950
- Presidential election
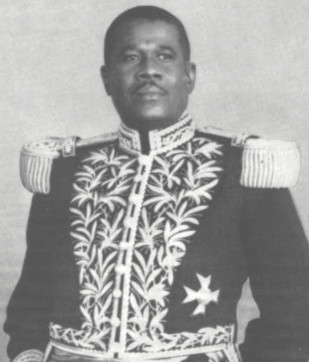
Nominee	Paul Magloire
Party	MOP
Popular vote	527,625
Percentage	100%
President before election
Franck Lavaud (Chairman of the Government Junta)
Military
Elected President
Paul Magloire
MOP

General elections were held in Haiti on 8 October 1950 to elect the president and members of the Senate and Chamber of Deputies. For the first time in history, the presidency was elected by public vote rather than by members of the Chamber of Deputies. The presidential term was set at six years with no possibility of extension or immediate re-election.

Paul Magloire was the only candidate in the presidential election, and was elected unopposed running under the Peasant Worker Movement banner.

== Results ==
=== President ===
Candidate	Party	Votes	%
Paul Magloire	Peasant Worker Movement	527,625	100.00
Total		527,625	100.00
Source: Nohlen
