= Beethova Obas =

Haitian musician (born 1964)

Beethova Obas (born 1964) is a Haitian musician.

== Background ==
Beethova's father, Charles Obas, was a painter. A music lover, he named Beethova after Beethoven. Beethova was only 4 years old when Charles Obas disappeared after participating in a protest against murders committed by François Duvalier's dictatorial regime. Charles Obas was never seen again, leaving the family in financial trouble, while also having a social and emotional impact.

Beethova became a self-taught musician, learning the guitar and accordion. His first musical release was a song composed with Manno Charlemagne, "Nwel Anme" (Bitter Christmas). In 1988, he won a Découverte RFI award for the Best Young Singer, when Manu Dibango, President of the Jury noted his voice and talent.

In 1991, Martiniquan pianist Paulo Rosine invited Obas to sing on Malavoi's album Matébis after discovering his voice during a tour of the band in Haiti. Beethova then toured the Caribbean and France, gaining wider exposure and recognition.

Obas' favorite artists to work with have been Jocelyne Béroard, Ralph Thamar and Manno Charlemagne all of whom he credits for helping him develop his craft.

== Awards ==
Best Young Singer, Découverte Radio France Internationale contest, 1988

== Albums ==
- Le Chant de la Liberté, 1990
- Si, 1994 via Déclic (ref. 840 373 2)
- Pa Prese, 1996 (ref. 842 009 2)
- Planet La, 1999
- Ke'm Poze, 2003
