= 1961 Haitian presidential referendum =

- 30 April 1961
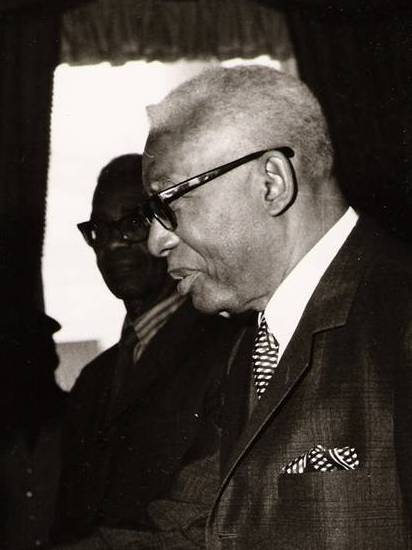
Nominee	François Duvalier
Party	PUN
Popular vote	1,320,748
Percentage	100%
President before election
François Duvalier
National Unity Party
Elected President
François Duvalier
National Unity Party

A presidential referendum was held in Haiti on 30 April 1961 alongside parliamentary elections. Voters were asked whether President François Duvalier should remain in office for a further six years. The official count was 1,320,748 votes in favor of Duvalier and none against. The New York Times wrote that "Latin America has witnessed many fraudulent elections throughout its history but none has been more outrageous than the one which has just taken place in Haiti."

== Legality and implications ==
Presidential reelection was expressly prohibited as per Article 87 of the Constitution in force at the time, which had been promulgated under the administration of Duvalier himself shortly after his inauguration in 1957.

In 1964, François "Papa Doc" Duvalier would go on to declare himself president for life.

== Results ==
Choice	Votes	%
For	1,320,748	100.00
Against	0	0.00
Total	1,320,748	100.00
