= Edith Lefel =

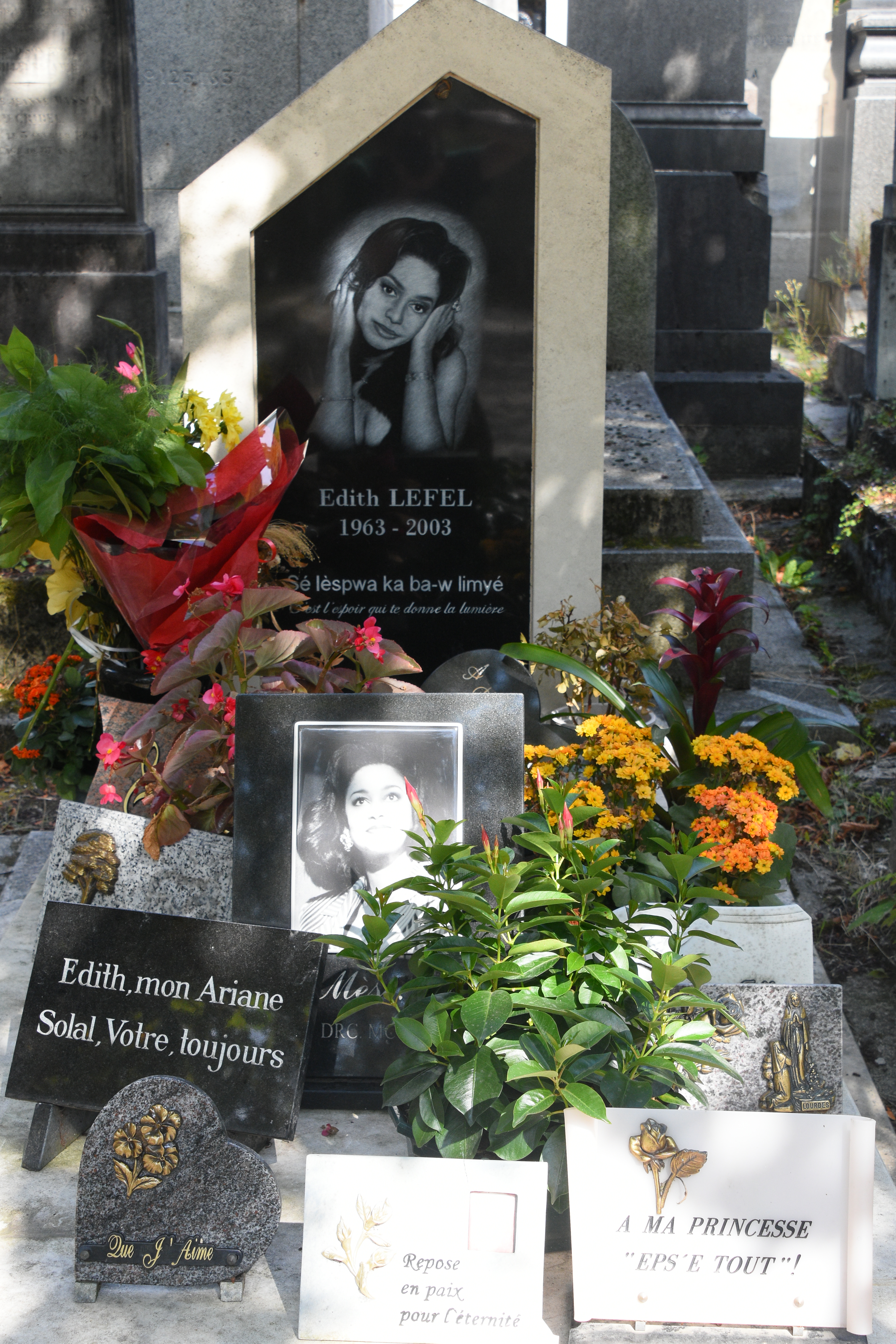
- Memorial to Edith Lefel

Background information
- Born: November 17, 1963; Cayenne, French Guiana
- Died: January 20, 2003 (aged 39); Dreux, (Eure-et-Loir)
- Genres: Zouk
- Occupation: singer
- Instrument: vocals
- Years active: 1980s–2000s
- Labels: Aztec Musique

Edith Lefel (17 November 1963, in Cayenne, French Guiana - 20 January 2003, in Dreux, France) was a French singer.

== Biography ==
Lefel's mother was from French Guiana and her father, a meteorologist, from the island of Martinique; she is Edith in memory of a cyclone of the same name. She moved with her parents to Martinique when she was three. It was there that she was exposed to the rich musical traditions of the Caribbean. During the 1970s, Lefel grew up in a compas or cadence music environment where Haitian Compas bands such as Les Frères Déjean, Le Ska Shah Number One and Tabou Combo flourished, featuring a rich modern western-Hispaniola meringue-compas style (the Dominican Republic is located on the eastern side of the island where it's spelled merengue in Spanish), in the Afro-Caribbean diaspora that includes the basic music of the French Antilles, Haiti, Dominica, Cabo Verde and several places in west Africa and the continental Americas.

In her 14th year, Lefel and her mother left for France, settling in the Saint-Denis suburb of Paris. There she continued her studies in law, occasionally singing with her brother's folk rock group, and, in 1984, launched her career as a professional singer. The turning point in her career came when she met the Maffia band leader Jean-Michel Cambrimol. He invited her to accompany the band on a tour of the French Antilles, and recorded the hit single "My doudou" with her. Lefel's success on that tour led to more offers, including one from Jean-Luc Lazair of Lazair, with whom she recorded the single "Ich Maman". In 1987, she accepted an offer from the famous Martinican group Malavoi, appearing as a chorus singer on their album La case à Lucie. She earned her nickname "la sirène" by singing a song of that title on Malavoi's 1993 album Matebis. During the same period she met the arranger and producer Ronald Rubinel, whom she later married and with whom she had twin sons.

The year after Lefel first appeared with Malavoi she recorded her first solo album, La klé (The Key), which won the Prix de la SACEM for its bassist-producer Georges Décimus in 1988. The album included a duet between Lefel and "Latin Crooner" Ralph Thamar - one of many collaborations Lefel recorded during her career with famous musicians, including Gilles Voyer, Dominique Zorobabel, Jean-Philippe Marthély, Sylviane Cédia and Mario Canonge. She explained to an interviewer for the RFI Musique website that when she hosted a house party she invited the people she loved the most, and she felt there was no reason why a recording session should be any different.

By 1992, Lefel had become well known throughout the Caribbean and her reputation had spread to Mozambique. In that year she released her second album, Mèci (Thanks), which was honored with the Sacem trophy for the best female singer of the year. Mèci broke records for Afro-Caribbean independent artists, selling in excess of 40,000 units. Her third album Rendez-vous, released in 1996, continued to build her reputation as one of the leading female interpreters of Afro-Caribbean genres.

But that same year Lefel took her career in quite a different direction, with a live recording made at the famed Olympia theater in Paris. In Edith Lefel a l'Olympia, the artist expanded her repertoire to include French and English language material, including some of the Parisian street songs that had been popularized by Edith Piaf. She explained that her parents had listened to Piaf when she was young (along with other classic French-language chanteurs like Jacques Brel and Charles Aznavour), and that Edith Lefel had often imitated Edith Piaf at home for their entertainment. On the evening of the Olympia concert, May 11, 1996, Lefel impressed the audience with her immense talent, supported by her friends Ralph Thamar and Jean-Luc Alger, and her husband and children.

A very attractive woman whose likeness graced the covers of many prominent French magazines, Lefel died at the height of her powers and popularity in January 2003, at only age 39. Autopsy results revealed that she died of a heart attack in her sleep, and ruled out the possibility of an overdose. Edith Lefel is buried at Père Lachaise Cemetery.

== Discography ==
=== Albums ===
- Le meilleur de Edith Lefel (2003)
- Si seulement (2002)
- The best of Edith Lefel (2001)
- À fleur de peau (1999)
- Edith Lefel à l'Olympia (1996)
- Rendez-vous (1996)
- Mèci (1992)
- La Klé (1988)
- Sanglots
- Edith Lefel chante Édith Piaf (1999)

also appearing on

Tilda (Ronald Rubinel, 1987)
