= Charles Obas =

Haitian painter

Charles Obas was an early-twentieth-century painter of Haitian art.

== Biography ==
In 1927, Charles Obas was born in Plaisance, Nord, a mountainous region in the northern part of Haiti. He joined the Haitian Centre D’Art in the late 1940s, but left after two years to help form the Foyer des Arts Plastiques in 1950. He won first prize in a contest sponsored by the National Office of Tourism in 1958.

In addition to his artistic talent, Obas was also an equally accomplished musician.

== Art ==
Obas’ paintings frequently depicted about rain. Some see his works as allegories depicting the realities and struggles of living under the oppression of François Duvalier regime. Cowering or burdened villagers, rainstorms, turbulent harbors, and ominous nocturnes are some of his most enduring motifs. His style was wholly unique as he eschewed the optimistic perspective, and bright, cheerful color palettes of most of his Haitian compatriots.

== Death ==
Obas created several paintings critical of Duvalier's regime in 1969, and disappeared not long after an art showing which included them.

According to his son, Beethova Obas, in 1969 Obas was outraged by the execution of his cousin on the orders of Duvalier, and went directly to the National Palace to protest this injustice. Although Duvalier knew Obas personally, and owned several of his paintings, he viewed Obas as an assassin when he arrived. Obas was taken into custody, and was never heard from again.
