= 1957 Haitian general election =

- 22 September 1957
- Presidential election
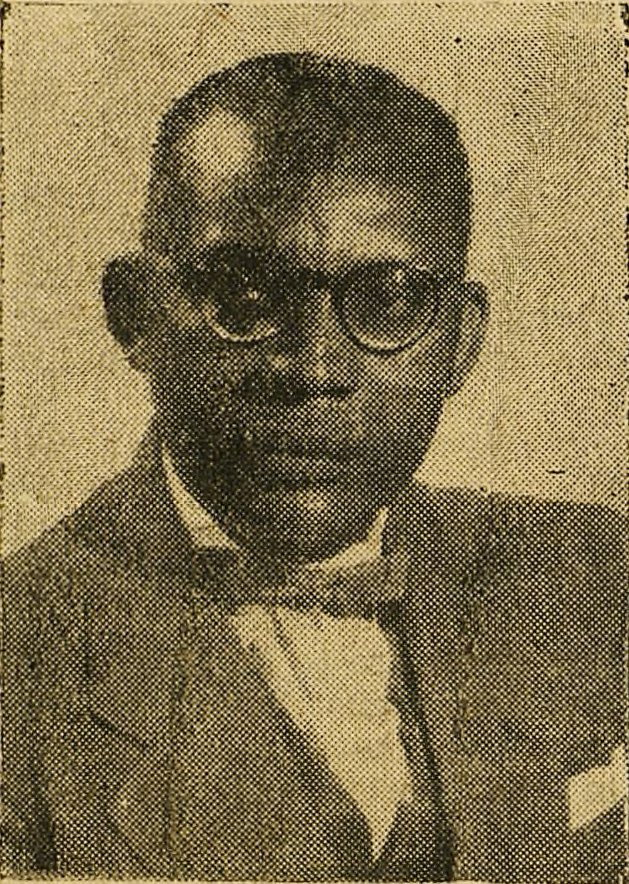

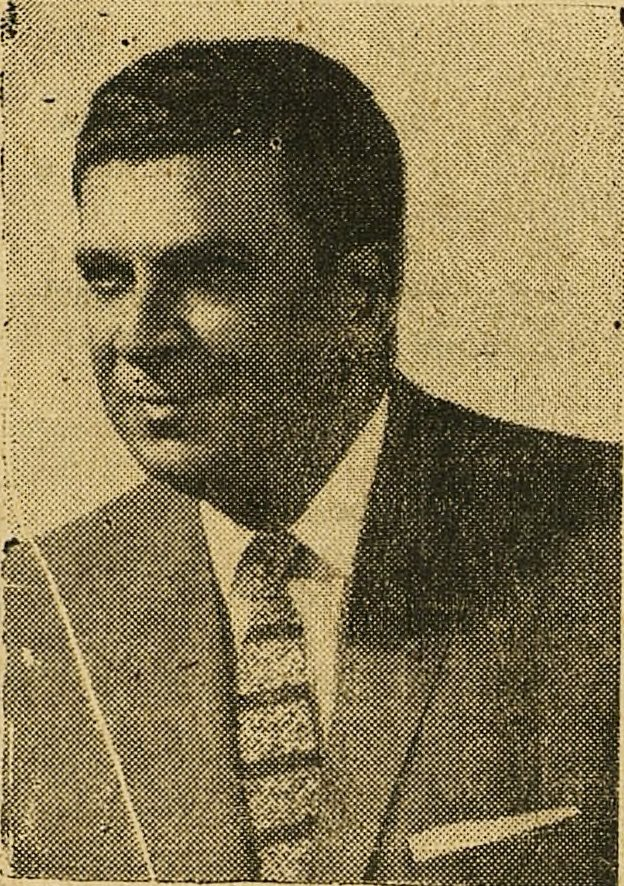
Nominee	François Duvalier	Louis Déjoie
Party	PUN	PAEN
Popular vote	680,509	249,956
Percentage	72.36%	26.58%
President before election
Antonio Thrasybule Kébreau (Chairman of the Military Council)
Military
Elected President
François Duvalier
National Unity Party

General elections were held in Haiti on 22 September 1957. Former Minister of Labour François Duvalier won the presidential election running under the National Unity Party banner, defeating Louis Déjoie, as well as independent moderate Clement Jumelle, who had dropped out on election day in a cloud of suspicions that the army was monitoring the election in favour of Duvalier. Former head of state Daniel Fignolé, considered a champion of poor blacks, was considered ineligible as he had been forcibly exiled months before the election, allegedly kidnapped.

Supporters of Duvalier also won the Chamber of Deputies elections. Following the election, Déjoie went into exile in Cuba along with his supporters, fearing repression from Duvalier's supporters.

Over the next few years, Duvalier consolidated his power step by step, culminating in two sham "re-elections," the second of which made him president for life in 1964. Haiti was not to see another even partly free election until 1988, two years after the fall of Duvalier's son Jean-Claude.

Voters cut the nail of the little finger of the left hand and dipped it in indelible ink to mark that the person voted.

== Results ==
=== President ===
Candidate	Party	Votes	%
François Duvalier	National Unity Party	680,509	72.36
Louis Déjoie	National Agricultural Industrial Party	249,956	26.58
Clément Jumelle	National Party	9,980	1.06
Total		940,445	100.00
Source: Nohlen

=== Chamber of Deputies ===
Party	Seats
Duvalier supporters	35
Déjoie supporters	2
Total	37
Source: Nohlen
