= Louis Déjoie =

Haitian politician (1896–1969)

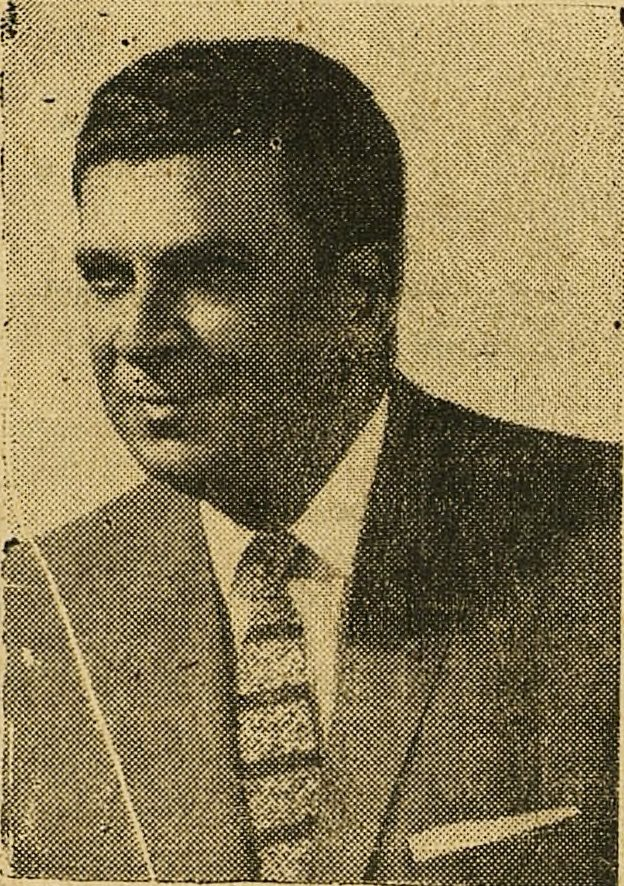
Déjoie in 1957

Pierre Joseph Louis Déjoie (23 February 1896 – 11 July 1969, Port-au-Prince, Haiti) was a wealthy Haitian sugar planter, industrialist, agricultural engineer, landowner and politician.

== Early years ==
Déjoie was a descendant of a French slave-holder, and former Haitian President Fabre Geffrard, who overthrew the Faustin empire.

He ran for the Presidency against Francois Duvalier in 1957 Haitian general election. His party only won 2 of the 37 seats in the country's Chamber of Deputies, and he received only 26.6% of the vote to Duvalier's 72.4%.
