= Daniel Fignolé =

Haitian politician

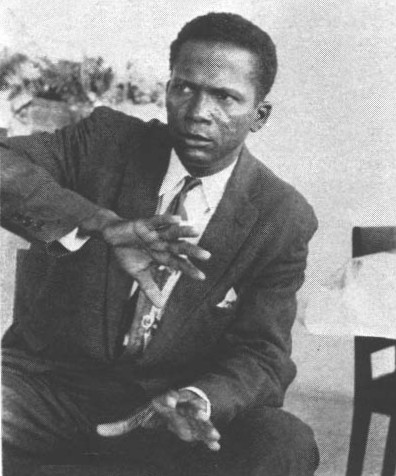

President of Haiti (Provisional)
- In office May 25, 1957 – June 14, 1957
- Preceded by: Franck Sylvain
- Succeeded by: Antonio Thrasybule Kébreau

Member of the Executive Government Council of Haiti
- In office April 5, 1957 – May 25, 1957

Minister of Education and Public Health
- In office August 19, 1946 – October 26, 1946
- President: Dumarsais Estimé
- Preceded by: Benoit Alexandre
- Succeeded by: Jean Price-Mars (National Education); Georges Honorat (Public Health)

Personal details
- Born: Pierre-Eustache Daniel Fignolé; November 11, 1913 Pestel, Haiti
- Died: August 27, 1986 (aged 72) Port-au-Prince, Haiti
- Party: MOP
- Spouse: Carmen Jean-François
- Relations: Rich Benjamin (Grandson)
- Profession: Teacher

Pierre-Eustache Daniel Fignolé (French pronunciation: [pjɛʁ østaʃ danjɛl fiɲɔle]; November 11, 1913 – August 27, 1986) was a Haitian politician who became Haiti's provisional head of state for three weeks in 1957. He was one of the most influential leaders in the pre-Duvalier era, a liberal labor organizer in Port-au-Prince so popular among urban workers that he could call upon them at a moment's notice to hold mass protests, known as "woulo konpresè"—Haitian Creole for "steamroller."

== Early life ==
Fignolé was born in the coastal town of Pestel, Corail Arrondissement in the Grand'Anse department. He was born to an impoverished family and moved to Port-au-Prince in 1927 at age 14 to seek education and work. Despite constant ill health because of chronic malnutrition, he excelled in school and was accepted to one of the city's most prestigious institutions. He made a living tutoring the children of Haiti's wealthy elite.

== Political career ==
Fignolé co-founded in 1942 a newspaper called Chantiers with a liberal noiriste political slant. In it he lambasted Haïtï's mulatto elite for their selfishness and argued for broad social programs to uplift the majority black-skinned poor. Then president Élie Lescot responded to harsh critiques by closing the paper, firing Fignolé from his government teaching position, and placing him under police surveillance.

He continued his political activity, quickly becoming known among Port-au-Prince's poor working class as 'le professeur' or as in English, "the professor" for his impassioned orations, writing, and leadership of labor strikes. By 1946, he was known for having the power to flood the streets instantly with the urban poor in demonstrations. These flash mobs were called "woulos", or steamrollers.

The following year he agreed to lead the Mouvement Ouvrier Paysan ("Peasant Worker Movement" or MOP), which would become most organized labor party in Haitian history and the largest mass organization in the pre-Duvalier era. It included factory workers, dockworkers, hydraulic workers, gas station workers, barbers, dessert chefs, and laborers from other sectors. He wanted to run for the Haitian presidency, but at age 33 he was barred by the Haitian constitution.

Fignolé was at various points spied on, beaten, and imprisoned by authorities for his labor activism. Fignolé and François Duvalier shared in common a noirist politics of black empowerment and collaborated at times in political dissent against ruling regimes. Under the government of Dumarsais Estimé, Fignolé briefly held the post of Minister of Education. He refused to tone down his attacks on the mulatto elite, saying, "If anyone thinks they can stop what I am doing for my people, I will be forced to use my woulo to destroy them!" But unlike Duvalier, Fignolé had little political support in the countryside beyond the capital city.

== Short-lived presidency ==
On 25 May 1957, amidst a chaotic election process and spiraling civil strife, Fignolé was designated as provisional president because of his unsurpassed popularity in Port-au-Prince. As Fignolé descended the steps of the National Palace on the day of his inauguration, crowds of ecstatic supporters waving MOP flags streamed into the streets and converged on the palace grounds. He pledged to raise the daily wage and expressed determination to remain in office, angering his opponents.

Although Fignolé promised a Franklin D. Roosevelt-style New Deal and was explicitly anti-communist, his politics had long made him suspicious in the eyes of the Cold War-era American administrations. United States Central Intelligence Agency (CIA) director Allen Dulles warned President Dwight D. Eisenhower that Fignolé had "a strong leftist orientation". The administration refused to recognize the Fignolé government, whose political program was seen as "comparable with the Soviets." Eisenhower told the French Embassy in Washington, D.C. that he was worried that Fignolé "might eventually become another Arbenz", referring to the social-democratic President of Guatemala overthrown three years earlier in a CIA-backed coup d'état.

With foreign governments and most elements of Haiti's traditional power structure arrayed against him, Fignolé could not hold on to power. After just 19 days, the Haitian armed forces, with U.S. foreknowledge, broke into the presidential chambers. They seized Fignolé, forced him at gunpoint to sign a resignation letter, and bundled him into a waiting car.

From exile in New York City, Fignolé blamed Duvalier, a rival candidate for president, for his overthrow, but his demands for reinstatement fell on deaf ears. For days, protesting Fignolé supporters in poor districts were gunned down by soldiers under Antonio Kébreau's military regime.

With ties to the army, Duvalier won the 1957 presidential election and became head of state. His family's authoritarian rule would last 29 years.

== Return from exile ==
In 1986, after the fall of Jean-Claude Duvalier, who succeeded his father, an ailing 72-year-old Fignolé returned from a long exile to Port-au-Prince. Scores of supporters welcomed him at the airport. He died a few months later.
