= Antonio Thrasybule Kébreau =

President of Haiti (1909–1963)

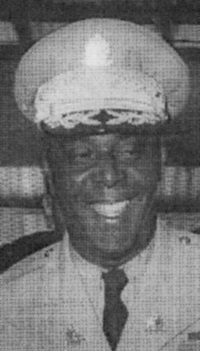

Chairman of the Military Council
- In office 14 June 1957 – 22 October 1957
- Preceded by: Daniel Fignolé
- Succeeded by: François Duvalier

Chief of the General Staff of the Army
- In office 26 May 1957 – 12 March 1958
- Preceded by: Léon Cantave
- Succeeded by: Maurice P. Flambert

Personal details
- Born: November 11, 1909 Port-au-Prince, Haiti
- Died: January 13, 1963 (aged 53) Pétion-Ville, Haiti
- Spouse: Marie Yvonne Charles
- Profession: Military (Brigadier general)

Antonio Thrasybule Kébreau (French pronunciation: [ɑ̃tɔnjo tʁazibyl kebʁo]; November 11, 1909 – January 11, 1963) was a Haitian politician. He was chairman of the Military Council (French: Président du Conseil militaire), a title that made him the provisional head of state of the Republic of Haiti from 14 June to 22 October 1957. His short reign followed that of Daniel Fignolé and preceded that of François Duvalier. During his rule, soldiers under Kébreau's rule massacred rioting Fignolé supporters.

== Bioraphy ==
Prior to his short tenure as head of state, Kébreau played a part in ousting interim president Daniel Fignolé and sending him into exile. According to Bernard Diederich in his book Papa Doc, Kébreau believed himself to be the real power behind Duvalier, as a military leader.

In order to assert who really had the power, Duvalier had him sent to a diplomatic post and relieved him of his domestic duties. Kébreau took this as a threat and fled to the Dominican Republic seeking asylum, before eventually going abroad and taking up his diplomatic post. His ascension to head of state made him the leader of the country's seventh government in six months.

Kébreau was appointed as the Haitian ambassador to Italy and the Holy See. He died suddenly on January 13, 1963. Allegedly, he was poisoned on Duvalier's orders.
