= Franck Lavaud =

Haitian politician (1903–1988)

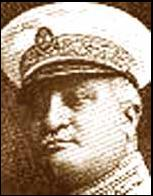
- Lavaud c. 1950

30th President of Haiti
- In office May 10, 1950 – December 6, 1950
- Preceded by: Dumarsais Estimé
- Succeeded by: Paul Magloire
- In office January 11, 1946 – August 16, 1946
- Preceded by: Élie Lescot
- Succeeded by: Dumarsais Estimé

Personal details
- Born: February 16, 1903 Jérémie, Haiti
- Died: February 27, 1988 (aged 85) Paris, France
- Occupation: Soldier (brigadier general)

Franck Lavaud (French pronunciation: [fʁɑ̃k lavo]; February 16, 1903 – February 27, 1988) was a Haitian general and politician who was an acting head of state during two terms: from January 11, 1946, until August 16, 1946, and from May 10, 1950 until December 6, 1950. Both times he led a military junta along with Paul Magloire and Antoine Levelt. He was the first Haitian head of state to have been born in the 20th century.

== Biography ==
Lavaud served as Commander of the Garde d'Haiti, the military of Haiti, starting in 1944. Haiti's President at the time was Élie Lescot, a member of the mulatto elite. Despite popular support early in his regime, repression and the exposure of ties with Dominican President Rafael Trujillo caused Lescot's reputation to fall. Crucially, Lescot had poor relations with the Garde, which was predominantly black.

In late 1945, an anti-Lescot student newspaper called La Ruche published its first issue in Port-au-Prince. The newspaper eschewed race-based politics and equated Lescot with Mussolini. Because the students offered recitations in the vernacular language of Creole to Port-au-Prince's illiterate working population, it acquired widespread popularity. On January 4, Garde members detained Franck Magloire, publisher of Le Matin, who allowed La Ruche to be published on his presses. In reaction to his detention, students began to protest in the streets. In the following days, they were joined by workers and received declarations of support from a new opposition organization, the Front Démocratique Unifié (FDU), headed by Georges Rigaud.

As the protests grew in intensity, Lescot met with opposition leaders and stated that he would dissolve the cabinet and step down on May 15, the fifth anniversary of his ascension to power. Despite that, the protests continued and Lescot privately asked Lavaud to use the Garde against the protesters. Lavaud refused to carry out the order and Lescot commanded his arrest. Later that day, Lavaud, his lieutenant Antoine Levelt, and American ambassador Orme Wilson Jr. formed the Conseil Exécutif Militaire (CEM), an organization committed to forcing Lescot out. Lavaud was able to convince Lescot of the danger of remaining in Haiti. The CEM pressured Lescot into resigning and on January 11 Lescot fled the country.

As leaders of the CEM, Lavaud, Levelt, and Paul Magloire came into control of the country. They promised to hold democratic elections, which occurred on May 12. The left wing fared poorly in the parliamentary elections in May and was powerless to prevent the Senate from electing the CEM's favored candidate, Dumarsais Estimé. After Estimé's election by the Senate, Lavaud stepped down and Estimé was inaugurated.

Afterwards, Lavaud resumed his duties as head of the Garde. Estimé had a left-wing agenda as President and attempted to placate the army to cement his rule. Lavaud was promoted to brigadier general. In addition, Estimé oversaw the renaming of the Garde to the Haitian Army in March 1947. Between 1946 and 1950 the balance of power in the Haitian military shifted and when Estimé was deposed by the military in 1950, Lavaud was president but less powerful than fellow officer Magloire. Magloire ultimately was directly elected president in his own right in direct elections in October of that year.

Political offices
Preceded by Élie Lescot	President of Haiti; 1946	Succeeded by Dumarsais Estimé
Preceded by Dumarsais Estimé	President of Haiti; 1950	Succeeded by Paul Magloire
