= François Duvalier =

President of Haiti from 1957 to 1971

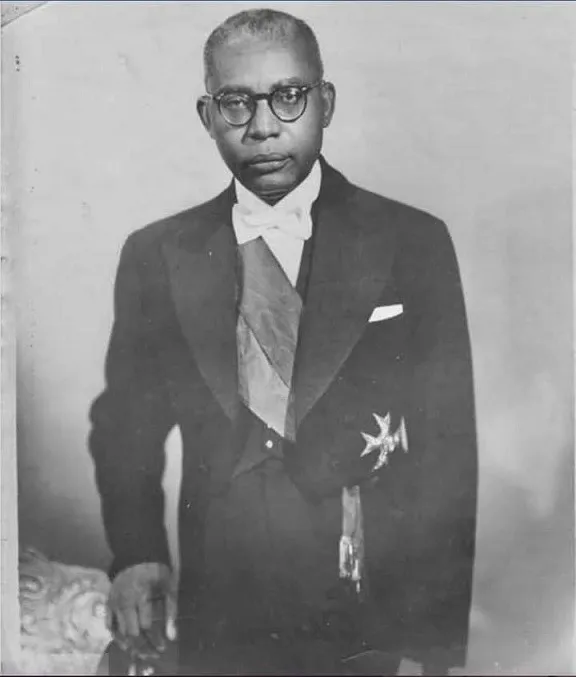
- Official portrait, 1957

34th President of Haiti
- In office 22 October 1957 – 21 April 1971
- Preceded by: Antonio Thrasybule Kébreau as Chairman of the Military Council
- Succeeded by: Jean-Claude Duvalier

Minister of Public Health and Labor
- In office 14 October 1949 – 10 May 1950
- President: Dumarsais Estimé
- Preceded by: Antonio Vieux (Public Health); Louis Bazin (Labor)
- Succeeded by: Joseph Loubeau (Public Health); Emile Saint-Lot (Labor)

Under Secretary of Labor
- In office 26 November 1948 – 14 October 1949
- President: Dumarsais Estimé

Personal details
- Born: 14 April 1907 Port-au-Prince, Haiti
- Died: 21 April 1971 (aged 64) Port-au-Prince, Haiti
- Resting place: Grand Cemetery, Port-au-Prince
- Party: MOP (1946 - 1947) PUN
- Spouse: Simone Ovide (m. 1939)
- Children: 4, including Jean-Claude
- Education: University of Michigan; University of Haiti (MD)
- Profession: Physician
- Nickname: Papa Doc

François Duvalier (Note: French pronunciation: [fʁɑ̃swa dyvalje]) (14 April 1907 – 21 April 1971), also known as Papa Doc, was a Haitian politician, dictator and physician who served as president of Haiti from 1957 until his death in 1971.

Duvalier completed a degree in medicine from the University of Haiti in 1934 and spent a year at the University of Michigan studying public health. In 1943 he became active in a campaign to control the spread of contagious tropical diseases in Haiti. His patients affectionately called him "Papa Doc," a moniker that he used throughout his life. Duvalier served as Minister for Public Health and Labor under the administration of Dumarsais Estimé.

Duvalier was elected president in the 1957 general election on a populist and black nationalist platform. After thwarting a military coup d'état in July 1958, his regime rapidly became more autocratic and eventually totalitarian. Duvalier was unanimously "re-elected" in a 1961 presidential election in which he was the only candidate. Afterwards, he consolidated his power step by step, culminating in 1964 when he declared himself president for life after another sham referendum and election.

An undercover government death squad, the Tonton Macoute (Haitian Creole: Tonton Makout), indiscriminately tortured or killed Duvalier's opponents; the Tonton Macoute was thought to be so pervasive that Haitians became highly fearful of expressing any form of dissent, even in private. The Tonton Macoute eventually came to number 300,000 and more than half of the government budget was allocated to the group as well as the Presidential Guard. Duvalier further sought to solidify his rule by incorporating elements of Haitian mythology, most prominently Vodou, into a personality cult.

Duvalier remained in power until his death in 1971 and was succeeded by his son, Jean‑Claude, who was nicknamed "Baby Doc."

== Early life and career ==
Duvalier was born in Port-au-Prince in 1907, the son of Duval Duvalier, justice of the peace, teacher and journalist, whose family came from Martinique, and Ulyssia Abraham, a baker. His aunt, Madame Florestal, raised him as a child. He completed a degree in medicine from the University of Haiti in 1934, and served as staff physician at several local hospitals. He spent a year at the University of Michigan studying public health and in 1943, became active in a United States–sponsored campaign to control the spread of contagious tropical diseases, helping the poor to fight typhus, yaws, malaria and other tropical diseases that had ravaged Haiti for years. His patients affectionately called him "Papa Doc", a moniker that he used throughout his life.

The racism and violence that occurred during the United States occupation of Haiti, which began in 1915, inspired black nationalism among Haitians and left a powerful impression on the young Duvalier. He was also aware of the latent political power of the poor black majority and their resentment against the small mulatto elite. Duvalier supported Pan-African ideals, and became involved in the négritude movement of Haitian author Jean Price-Mars, both of which led to his advocacy of Haitian Vodou, an ethnological study of which later paid enormous political dividends for him. In 1938, Duvalier co-founded the journal Les Griots. On 27 December 1939, he married Simone Ovide, a mulatto nurse's aide. They had four children: Marie‑Denise, Nicole, Simone, and Jean‑Claude.

== Political rise ==
In 1946, Duvalier aligned himself with President Dumarsais Estimé and was appointed Director General of the National Public Health Service. In 1949, he served as Minister of Health and Labor, but when Duvalier opposed Paul Magloire's 1950 coup d'état, he left the government and resumed practicing medicine. His practice included taking part in campaigns to prevent yaws and other diseases. In 1954, Duvalier abandoned medicine, hiding out in Haiti's countryside from the Magloire regime. In 1956, the Magloire government was failing, and although still in hiding, Duvalier announced his candidacy to replace him as president. By December 1956, an amnesty was issued and Duvalier emerged from hiding, and on 12 December 1956, Magloire conceded defeat.

The two frontrunners in the 1957 campaign for the presidency were Duvalier and Louis Déjoie, a mulatto landowner and industrialist from the north. During their campaigning, Haiti was ruled by five temporary administrations, none lasting longer than a few months. Duvalier promised to rebuild and renew the country and rural Haiti solidly supported him as did the military. He resorted to noiriste populism, stoking the majority Afro-Haitians' irritation at being governed by the few mulatto elite, which is how he described his opponent, Déjoie.

François Duvalier was elected president on 22 September 1957. Duvalier received 679,884 votes to Déjoie's 266,992. Even in this election, however, there are multiple first-hand accounts of voter fraud and voter intimidation.

== Presidency ==
=== Consolidation of power ===
After being elected president in 1957, Duvalier exiled most of the major supporters of Déjoie. He had a new constitution adopted that year.

Duvalier promoted and installed members of the black majority in the civil service and the army. In July 1958, three exiled Haitian army officers and five American mercenaries landed in Haiti and tried to overthrow Duvalier; all were killed. Although the army and its leaders had quashed the coup attempt, the incident deepened Duvalier's distrust of the army, an important Haitian institution over which he did not have firm control. He replaced the chief-of-staff with a more reliable officer and then proceeded to create his own power base within the army by turning the Presidential Guard into an elite corps aimed at maintaining his power. After this, Duvalier dismissed the entire general staff and replaced it with officers who owed their positions, and their loyalty, to him.

In 1959, Duvalier created a rural militia, the Milice de Volontaires de la Sécurité Nationale (MVSN, English: Militia of National Security Volunteers)—commonly referred to as the Tonton Macoute after a Haitian Creole bogeyman—to extend and bolster support for the regime in the countryside. The Macoute, which by 1961 was twice as big as the army, never developed into a real military force but was more than just a secret police.

In the early years of his rule, Duvalier was able to take advantage of the strategic weaknesses of his powerful opponents, mostly from the mulatto elite. These weaknesses included their inability to coordinate their actions against the regime, whose power had grown increasingly strong. In the name of nationalism, Duvalier expelled almost all of Haiti's foreign-born bishops, an act that earned him excommunication from the Catholic Church. In 1966, he persuaded the Holy See to allow him permission to nominate the Catholic hierarchy for Haiti. Duvalier now exercised more power in Haiti than ever.

=== Heart attack and Barbot affair ===
On 24 May 1959, Duvalier suffered a massive heart attack, possibly due to an insulin overdose; he had been a diabetic since early adulthood and also suffered from heart disease and associated circulatory problems. During the heart attack, he was comatose for nine hours. His physician believed that he had suffered neurological damage during these events, harming his mental health and perhaps explaining his subsequent actions.

While recovering, Duvalier left power in the hands of Clément Barbot, leader of the Tonton Macoute. Upon his return to work, Duvalier accused Barbot of trying to supplant him as president and had him imprisoned. In April 1963, Barbot was released and began plotting to remove Duvalier from office by kidnapping his children. The plot failed and Duvalier then ordered a nationwide search for Barbot and his fellow conspirators. During the search, Duvalier was told that Barbot had transformed himself into a black dog, which prompted Duvalier to order that all black dogs in Haiti be put to death. The Tonton Macoute captured and killed Barbot in July 1963. In other incidents, Duvalier ordered the head of an executed rebel packed in ice and brought to him so he could commune with the dead man's spirit. Peepholes were carved into the walls of the interrogation chambers, through which Duvalier watched Haitian detainees being tortured and submerged in baths of sulfuric acid; sometimes, he was in the room during the torture.

=== Constitutional changes ===
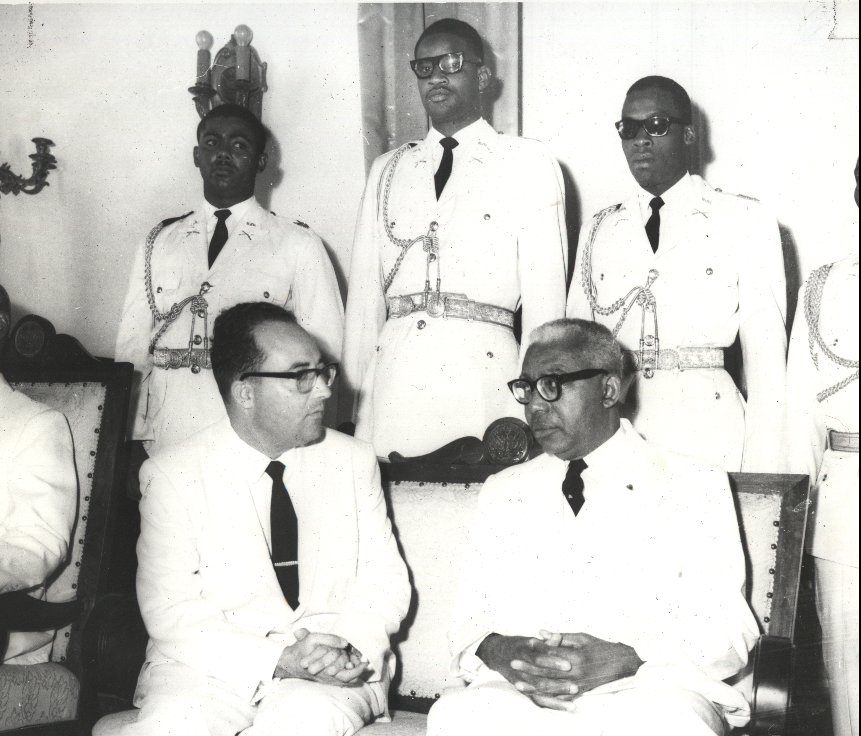
Duvalier and Joel Barromi, Israeli ambassador to Haiti, surrounded by Haitian generals in 1963

In 1961, Duvalier began violating the provisions of the 1957 constitution. First, he replaced the bicameral legislature with a unicameral body. Then he called a new presidential election in which he was the sole candidate. His term was to expire in 1963 and the constitution prohibited re-election, but the referendum sought to extend his term until 1967. The election was flagrantly rigged; the official tally showed a total of 1,320,748 "yes" votes for allowing Duvalier to stay in office, with none opposed. Upon hearing the results, he proclaimed, "I accept the people's will. ... As a revolutionary, I have no right to disregard the will of the people". The New York Times commented, "Latin America has witnessed many fraudulent elections throughout its history but none has been more outrageous than the one which has just taken place in Haiti". On 14 June 1964, another constitutional referendum made Duvalier "President for Life", a title previously held by seven Haitian presidents; it also changed the flag and coat of arms from blue and red to black and red, with the black symbolising the country's ties to Africa. This referendum was also blatantly rigged; an implausible 99.9% voted in favor, which should have come as no surprise since all the ballots were premarked "yes". The new document granted Duvalier—or Le Souverain, as he was called—absolute powers as well as the right to name his successor.

=== Foreign relations ===
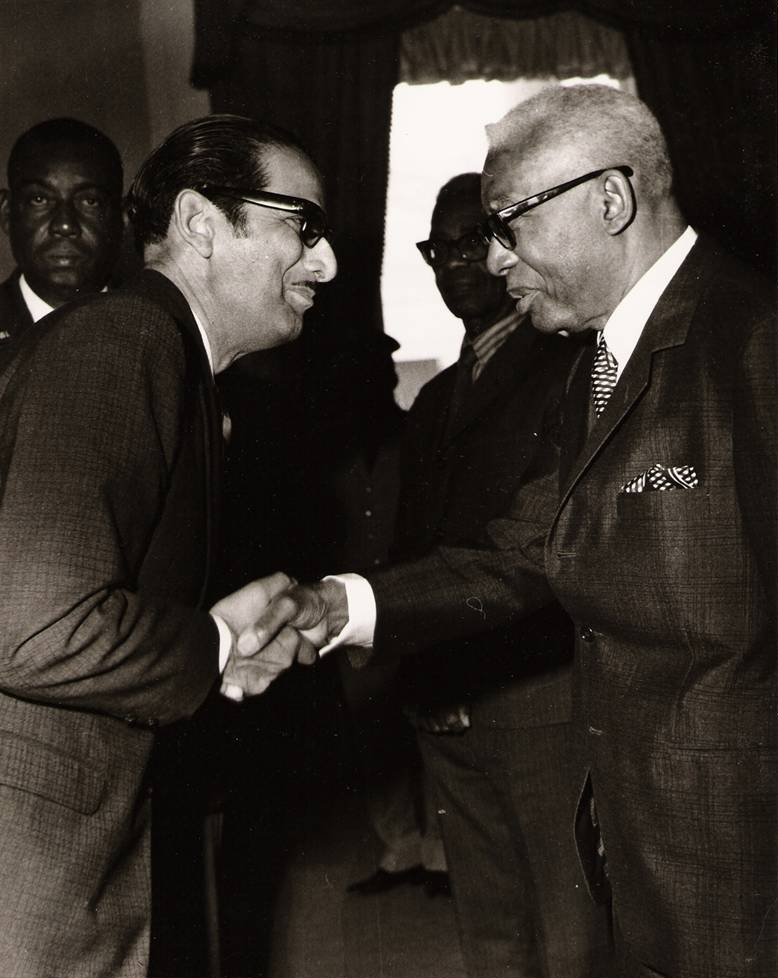
Duvalier greeting David Tercero Castro, ambassador of Guatemala to Haiti, in 1968

==== United States ====
His relationship with the United States proved difficult. In his early years, Duvalier rebuked the United States for its friendly relations with Dominican dictator Rafael Trujillo (assassinated in 1961) while ignoring Haiti. The Kennedy administration (1961–1963) was particularly disturbed by Duvalier's repressive and totalitarian rule and allegations that he misappropriated aid money, at the time a substantial part of the Haitian budget, and a U.S. Marine Corps mission to train the Tonton Macoute. The U.S. thus halted most of its economic assistance in mid-1962, pending stricter accounting procedures, with which Duvalier refused to comply. Duvalier publicly renounced all aid from Washington on nationalist grounds, portraying himself as a "principled and lonely opponent of domination by a great power".

Duvalier misappropriated millions of dollars of international aid, including US$15 million annually from the United States. He transferred this money to personal accounts. Another of Duvalier's methods of obtaining foreign money was to gain foreign loans, including US$4 million from Cuban dictator Fulgencio Batista.

After the assassination of John F. Kennedy in November 1963, which Duvalier later claimed resulted from a curse that he had placed on Kennedy, the U.S. eased its pressure on Duvalier, grudgingly accepting him as a bulwark against communism. Duvalier attempted to exploit tensions between the U.S. and Cuba, emphasizing his anti-communist credentials and Haiti's strategic location as a means of winning U.S. support:

Communism has established centres of infection ... No area in the world is as vital to American security as the Caribbean ... We need a massive injection of money to reset the country on its feet, and this injection can come only from our great, capable friend and neighbor the United States.

==== Cuba ====
After Fulgencio Batista (a friend of Duvalier) was overthrown in the Cuban Revolution, Duvalier worried that new Cuban leader Fidel Castro would provide a haven for Haitian dissidents.

Duvalier enraged Castro by voting against the country in an Organization of American States (OAS) meeting and subsequently at the United Nations, where a trade embargo was imposed on Cuba. Cuba answered by breaking off diplomatic relations and Duvalier subsequently instituted a campaign to rid Haiti of communists.

==== Dominican Republic ====
Duvalier's relationship with the neighboring Dominican Republic was always tense: in his early years, Duvalier emphasized the differences between the two countries. In April 1963, relations were brought to the edge of war by the political enmity between Duvalier and Dominican president Juan Bosch. Bosch, a leftist, provided asylum and support to Haitian exiles who had plotted against the Duvalier regime. Duvalier ordered his Presidential Guard to occupy the Dominican Embassy in Pétion-Ville, with the goal of arresting a Haitian army officer believed to have been involved in Barbot's plot to kidnap Duvalier's children. The Dominican president reacted with outrage, publicly threatened to invade Haiti, and ordered army units to the border. However, as Dominican military commanders expressed little support for an invasion of Haiti, Bosch refrained from the invasion and sought mediation through the OAS.

==== Ethiopia ====
In 1966, Duvalier hosted the Emperor of Ethiopia, Haile Selassie, in what would be the only visit of a foreign head of state to Haiti under Duvalier. During the visit, the two discussed bilateral agreements between their two nations and the economic shortcomings brought about by international pressure. Duvalier awarded Haile Selassie the Necklace of the Order of Jean-Jacques Dessalines the Great, and the emperor, in turn, bestowed upon Duvalier the Great Necklace of the Order of the Queen of Sheba.

==== Holy See ====
Duvalier had a contentious relationship with the Holy See. The Vatican only recognized Haiti in 1860, and thereafter staffed its Church hierarchy with European clerics, mostly French Bretons. Even as the Haitian clergy slowly became "indigenized" in the early 20th century (the first Haitian-born bishop, Rémy Augustin, was consecrated in 1953), the church remained firmly aligned with the mulatto elite, conducting its business only in French and being a indefatigable opponent of Vodou practice. Duvalier's populist instincts and noirist sponsorship of peasant ways made him intensely suspicious of the Church in Haiti, which he viewed as a semi-colonial force. He began actively persecuting the church in 1959, unleashing Tontons Macoutes on Port-au-Prince Cathedral, and began expelling foreign priests. In November 1960, he deported the French Archbishop of Port-au-Prince, François Poirier, followed by his auxiliary, Bishop Augustin, and six French priests in January 1961 (resulting in his excommunication), and the Bishop of Gonaives and three French priests in November 1962. The entire Jesuit Order was expelled in 1964.

The Vatican sought to strike a deal with Duvalier in order to end his persecution of the church, culminating in a concordat signed on August 15, 1966. This concordat lifted Duvalier's excommunication, and gave him the ability to nominate indigenous Haitians to the country's hierarchy. Within days after the signing of the concordat, the country's six bishops and archbishop were replaced by indigenous Haitian clerics loyal to Duvalier. Duvalier's promotion of Vodou also waned after he assumed control of the Haitian Church. This state of affairs lasted until 1984, when the concordat was amended by the Vatican. However, the bishops nominated by Duvalier remained in office, with the Archbishop of Port-au-Prince, François-Wolff Ligondé, being particularly well-known as an ally of the Duvaliers until his toppling in 1991.

==== Nigeria and Biafra ====
During the Nigerian Civil War, Duvalier granted diplomatic recognition to Biafra during its war against Nigeria, making Haiti one of few countries that recognized Biafra. Duvalier's decision to recognize Biafra was influenced by his anti-communist foreign policy and by Haiti's historical connection to the Igbo people, the predominant ethnic group of Biafra.

=== Internal policies ===
==== Repression ====
1971 newsreel film about Duvalier's rule

Duvalier's government was one of the most repressive in the Western Hemisphere. During his 14-year rule, his regime murdered and exiled many political opponents; estimates of those killed, not only political opponents, range from 30,000 to 60,000. Attacks on Duvalier from within the military were treated as especially serious. When bombs were detonated near the Presidential Palace in 1967, Duvalier had nineteen officers of the Presidential Guard executed in Fort Dimanche. A few days later, Duvalier gave a public speech during which he read the attendance sheet with the names of all 19 officers killed. After each name, he said "absent". After reading the whole list, Duvalier remarked that "all were shot". Many of those killed in the government's repression were communists and even suspected communists. One of the reasons Duvalier targeted communism was to reassure the U.S. that he was not communist: Duvalier was exposed to communist and leftist ideas early in his life and rejected them. On 28 April 1969, Duvalier instituted a campaign to rid Haiti of all communists. A new law declared that "Communist activities, no matter what their form, are hereby declared crimes against the security of the State." Those convicted under the law would receive the death penalty and have their property confiscated.

==== Social and economic policies ====
Duvalier employed intimidation, repression, and patronage to supplant the old mulatto elites with a new elite of his own making. Corruption—in the form of government rake-offs of industries, bribery, extortion of domestic businesses, and stolen government funds—enriched the dictator's closest supporters. Most of them held sufficient power to intimidate the members of the old elite, who were gradually co-opted or eliminated.

The government confiscated peasant landholdings and allotted them to members of the militia, who had no official salary and made their living through crime and extortion. The dispossessed fled to the slums of the capital where they would find only meager incomes to feed themselves. Malnutrition and famine became endemic.

Nonetheless, Duvalier enjoyed significant support among Haiti's majority black rural population, who saw in him a champion of their claims against the historically dominant mulatto elite. During his 14 years in power, he created a substantial black middle class, chiefly through government patronage.

==== Personality cult and Vodou ====
Duvalier fostered an intense cult of personality, portraying himself as the physical embodiment of the island nation. He also revived the traditions of Vodou, later using them to consolidate his power with his claim of being a Vodou priest himself. In an effort to make himself even more imposing, Duvalier deliberately modeled his image on that of Baron Samedi, one of the lwa, or spirits, of Haitian Vodou. He often donned sunglasses in order to hide his eyes and talked with the strong nasal tone associated with the lwa. The regime's propaganda stated that "Papa Doc was one with the lwa, Jesus Christ and God himself". The most celebrated image from the time shows a standing Jesus Christ with a hand on the shoulder of a seated Papa Doc, captioned, "I have chosen him". Duvalier declared himself an "immaterial being" as well as "the Haitian flag" soon after his first election. In 1964, he published a catechism in which the Lord's Prayer was heavily reworded to praise Duvalier instead of God.

Duvalier also held in his closet the head of former opponent Blucher Philogenes, who tried to overthrow him in 1963. He believed another political enemy, Clément Barbot, was able to change at will into a black dog and had the militia begin killing black dogs on sight in the capital.

== Death and succession ==
François Duvalier died of heart disease and diabetes on 21 April 1971 aged 64. His 19-year-old son Jean-Claude Duvalier, nicknamed "Baby Doc", succeeded him as president. His Catholic funeral was held inside of the Hall of Statues in the National Palace on April 25, presided over by Archbishop Ligondé and the other bishops of Haiti and attended by a multitude of dignitaries, including American ambassador Clinton Knox. Initially placed in a fluorescent-lit glass box, his body was moved to a bronze glass-roofed coffin for interment. The large cortege processing to Port-au-Prince's Grand Cimetière was interrupted twice by minor crowd crushes. He was laid to rest in a small tiled mausoleum which he had earlier built for his father.

On 8 February 1986, when the Duvalier regime fell, a crowd attacked Duvalier's mausoleum, throwing boulders at it, chipping off pieces from it, and breaking open the crypt. Duvalier's coffin was not inside, however. A prevailing rumor in the capital, according to The New YorkTimes, was that his son had removed the remains when he fled to Paris in a U.S. Air Force transport plane the day before. As of 2015, only the desecrated foundation of his mausoleum remains.

== Books and films ==
Many books have been written about the Duvalier era in Haiti, the best known of which is Graham Greene's novel The Comedians. Duvalier, however, dismissed the piece and referred to its author as "a cretin, a stool pigeon, sadistic, unbalanced, perverted, a perfect ignoramous [sic], lying to his heart's content, the shame of proud and noble England, a spy, a drug addict, and a torturer". The book was later made into a film. Greene himself was declared persona non grata and barred from entering Haiti.

Alan Whicker featured Duvalier in a 1969 episode of Whicker's World, which included an interview with the president. Made by Yorkshire Television, the documentary is deeply revealing of Duvalier's character and of the state of Haiti in 1969.

The first authoritative book on the subject was Papa Doc: Haiti and its Dictator by Al Burt and Bernard Diederich, published in 1969, though several others by Haitian scholars and historians have appeared since Duvalier's death in 1971. One of the most informative, Fort-Dimanche, Dungeon of Death, dealt specifically with victims of Fort Dimanche, the prison which Duvalier used for the torture and murder of his political opponents.

In 2007, John Marquis wrote Papa Doc: Portrait of a Haitian Tyrant, which relied in part on records from a 1968 espionage trial in Haiti to detail numerous attempts on Duvalier's life. The trial's defendant, David Knox, was a Bahamian director of information. Knox lost and was sentenced to death, but he was later granted amnesty.

== Notes ==
Political offices
Preceded by Antonio Vieux as Minister of Public Health	Minister of Public Health and Labor; 1949–1950	Succeeded by Joseph Loubeau as Minister of Public Health
Preceded by Louis Bazin as Minister of Labor	Minister of Public Health and Labor; 1949–1950	Succeeded by Emile Saint-Lot as Minister of Labor
Preceded by Antonio Thrasybule Kébreau as Chairman of the Military Council	President of Haiti; 1957–1971	Succeeded by Jean-Claude Duvalier
Party political offices
New political party	Leader of the National Unity Party; 1957–1971	Succeeded by Jean-Claude Duvalier
