= Paul Magloire =

President of Haiti (1950–1956)

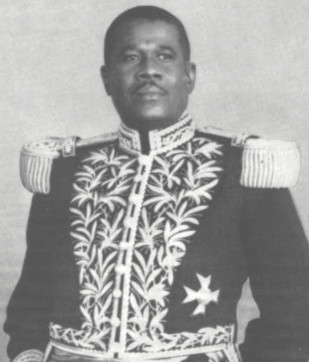

32nd President of Haiti
- In office December 6, 1950 – December 12, 1956
- Preceded by: Franck Lavaud
- Succeeded by: Joseph Nemours Pierre-Louis

Minister of Interior and Defence
- In office May 12, 1950 – August 3, 1950
- President: Franck Lavaud
- Preceded by: Louis Raymond
- Succeeded by: Luc E. Fouché

Member of the Government Junta of Haiti
- In office May 10, 1950 – December 6, 1950
- President: Franck Lavaud

Minister of Interior and Defence
- In office January 12, 1946 – August 16, 1946
- President: Franck Lavaud
- Preceded by: Vély Thébaud
- Succeeded by: Georges Honorat

Member of the Executive Military Committee
- In office January 11, 1946 – August 16, 1946
- President: Franck Lavaud

Personal details
- Born: Paul Eugène Magloire; July 19, 1907 Quartier-Morin, Haiti
- Died: July 12, 2001 (aged 93) Port-au-Prince, Haiti
- Other political affiliations: MOP (Mouvement Ouvrier Paysan)
- Spouse: Yolette Leconte
- Relations: Eugene Francois Magloire Philomene Mathieu
- Occupation: Military (Division general)

Military service
- Allegiance: Haiti
- Branch/service: Haitian Army
- Years of service: 1930–1950
- Rank: General

Paul Eugène Magloire (French pronunciation: [pɔl øʒɛn maɡlwaʁ]; July 19, 1907 – July 12, 2001), nicknamed Kanson Fè (Iron Pants, pronounced [kãsɔ̃ fɛ]), was the Haitian president from 1950 to 1956.

== Early life ==
Paul Eugène Magloire (né Paul Vincent Magloire), 30th president of Haiti and 33rd head of state (ephemeral military governments were excluded from the count), was born on July 19, 1907, in Quartier-Morin, commune of Cap-Haitien, in the North Departement. Paul was the son of a high-ranking General Eugene Francois Magloire, and Marie-Philomene Mathieu. He attended Lycee Philippe Guerrier. On April 18, 1936, he wed Yolette Leconte, a direct descendant of Jean-Jacques Dessalines; the marriage lasted till her death in 1981.

== Military career ==
On September 1, 1930, Paul joined the army. In 1935, he found himself in Cap-Haitien as sub-commander of this military district, a position he maintained until 1938 when he was promoted to the rank of captain and to the post of commander of the same district. In 1941, he was transferred to Port-au-Prince as commander of the National Penitentiary (also called Grand Prison) The following year he graduated from the Port-au-Prince Law School. He became Police Chief of Port-au-Prince in 1944. In January 1946, the population rose up against President Elie Lescot who found himself in great difficulty in Port-au-Prince. Lescot would later be accused by parliamentary committees of having used public funds to participate in World War II alongside the United States of America without taking into account the daily realities of the Haitian masses or the interests of Haiti. Magloire therefore proposes to President Élie Lescot to hand over power to a military junta of 3 members including Magloire himself who will occupy the post of Minister of the Interior and National Defense, from January 12 to August 16, 1946, Colonel Franck Lavaud and Antoine Levelt.

In August 1946, Dumarsais Estimé was elected President of Haiti against Dantès Louis Bellegarde. Magloire then found himself in the opposition and created MOP (Mouvement Ouvrier Paysan). In 1947, during a parliamentary session in Port-au-Prince, two ministers of the government of Dumarsais Estimé informed the parliamentary commission of inquiry that Haiti's participation in the Second World War had cost the government US $20 million to the government, and Haitian State had generated only US $1.5 million following the liquidation of German property sequestered in the country. Magloire ousted Estimé with the help of a local elite and took power. In 1950, he was proclaimed Colonel in the Haitian Army.

== Presidency ==
In May 1950, Colonel Franck Lavaud returned to power provisionally with the mission of organizing presidential elections to hand power over to a civilian, and Magloire joined him. In December of the same year, Magloire ran for the presidency. The election was the first in the nation's history where all adult males had the right to vote. Magloire won against a fragile coalition of socialists, communists, and conservatives.

During Magloire's rule, Haiti became a tourist spot for American and European tourists. His anti-communist position also gained favorable reception from the US government. In addition, he emphasized public works; revenues from the sale of coffee were used to repair towns, construct roads, public buildings, and a dam. He also oversaw the institution of women's suffrage.

Magloire was very fond of a vivid social life, staging numerous parties, social events, and ceremonies. Shortly after he came to power in December 1950, he amended the constitution to set up, by referendum, a republican presidential regime and broke with parliamentarism. His consistently anti-Communist policy was appreciated and supported by the United States. During his reign the streets of Cap-Haitien were asphalted, and the monuments of Vertières as well as the gatehouses of Barrière-Bouteille were built at the southern entrance to the capital. The result of such measures was that Haiti became one of the most popular tourist destinations in the Caribbean.

From 1954, Magloire's popularity fell. In that year Hurricane Hazel ravaged the country, and funds intended to provide relief for the populace were often stolen before they could reach those in need.

Magloire could not be a candidate for re-election, because the new Haitian political system did not permit more than a single term for a president. Accordingly, on December 12, 1956, Magloire's reign came to an end.

== Exile and death ==
Having resigned, Magloire fled the country amid strikes and demonstrations. Political instability continued in Haiti for most of the next eight months, with no one individual (military or civilian) able to dominate. The instability finished only when François Duvalier, whom most outsiders mistook for an unworldly intellectual, achieved power. On October 15, 1957, about a month after Duvalier became president, Magloire was officially condemned to exile and stripped of his Haitian citizenship. Thereafter the new regime confiscated all the properties owned by Magloire and his brothers, Arsène and Fernand; Magloire himself settled in New York City.

In 1986, when Duvalier's son and successor Jean-Claude lost office, Magloire left New York and returned to Haiti. Two years later he became an unofficial army advisor, although his hopes of regaining the presidency were never fulfilled. On July 19, 1997, he obtained the rare distinction of being made "Marshal of Haiti". He died, aged 93, on July 12, 2001. The Haitian government accorded him a state funeral.

Political offices
Preceded by Franck Lavaud	President of Haiti; 1950–1956	Succeeded by Joseph Nemours Pierre-Louis
