= Dumarsais Estimé =

Haitian politician (1900–1953)

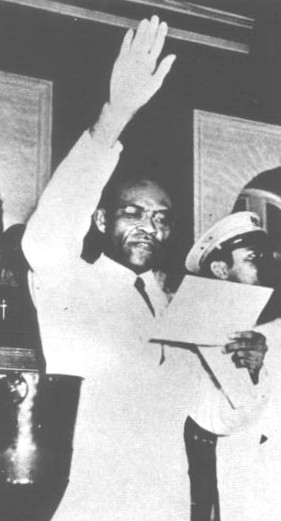
- Estimé in 1946

31st President of Haiti
- In office August 16, 1946 – May 10, 1950
- Preceded by: Franck Lavaud
- Succeeded by: Franck Lavaud

Minister of National Education, Agriculture and Labor
- In office November 29, 1937 – January 5, 1940
- President: Sténio Vincent
- Preceded by: Auguste Turnier
- Succeeded by: Luc E. Fouché

Personal details
- Born: Léon Dumarsais Estimé; April 21, 1900 Verrettes, Haiti
- Died: July 20, 1953 (aged 53) New York City, New York, United States
- Party: Liberal Party
- Other political affiliations: National Party
- Spouse: Lucienne Heurtelou (m. 1940–1953)
- Children: Jean-Robert, Philippe, Marie-Florence, Régine {Other children from first union: Paul, Raymonde, Lionel}
- Profession: Lawyer, teacher

Léon Dumarsais Estimé (French pronunciation: [leɔ̃ dymaʁsɛ ɛstime]; April 21, 1900 – July 20, 1953) was a Haitian politician and President of the Haitian Republic from August 16, 1946, to May 10, 1950.

Previously, he was a member of the Parliament for Verrettes for 16 years, as well as President of the Chamber and Minister (Secretary of State) for Public Education, Agriculture, and Labour.

Dumarsais Estimé's political ideology is a mixture of nationalism and progressivism. This ideology is called estimism. He advocated for collaborationism with the bourgeoisie, centralization policies, nationalization and liberalization economic policies.

The memory of his presidency remains very prominent among many Haitians due to the reforms undertaken and the undeniable economic and social progress that the Republic of Haiti experienced during this era. Among his more notable achievements are things such as the International Exhibition organized in 1949 to commemorate the bicentenary of the founding of Port-au-Prince in 1749 by the French colonists from the island of Santo Domingo (Le Livre Bleu), the expansion of the city of Belladère along the Dominican Republic border as a symbol of development, and the construction of a suspension bridge over the Grande-Anse River which still continues to serve region as river crossing to this day. It is important to also remember the laws passed and the investments made for the development of rural areas, the construction of many schools and the modernisation of the whole education system, as well as the protection of workers’ rights through the Labor Code and ultimately the creation of proper conditions for economic growth, mostly in tourism and small industry sectors. During this period, there was also significant improvement in the living conditions of the Haitian population.

In May 1950, a coup d’état organized by a military junta overthrew the government of Estimé and placed its leader, Paul Magloire, as head of the country, where he would be elected to the presidency in October 1950. Estimé was shortly deposed and exiled by the Haitian army led by Franck Lavaud. After travelling in France, Jamaica, and the US, he died in New York on July 20, 1953. Estimé was the last president to be constitutionally elected to office by the Chamber of Deputies, whereas Magloire was the first to be elected to office by universal adult male suffrage.

== Youth and education ==
Estimé was born on April 21, 1900, in Verrettes, a Haitian town located in the Artibonite Province, into a landowner’s family. His father, Alciné Estimé, was the son of Sara Dorval (1845–1938) and Estimé Pierre (1851–1904), among a group of siblings consisting of four boys and six girls. His mother, Fleurencia Massillon, was described as caring and made a deep impression on her son throughout his life, just as much as the death of his father did when Dumarsais was still a child.

His uncle, Estilus Estimé, mayor of Verrettes (1936) and senator of the Republic (1938), ensured his education and exercised a great deal of influence over Dumarsais. Estilus attempted to make Dumarsais aware of the Haitian social reality of the time and convinced him of the need for greater integrity in public affairs.

Estilus Estimé sent the young Dumarsais to the friars of Saint-Louis de Gonzague in St Marc; he then attended Collège Pinchinat and went to Lycée Alexandre-Pétion in Port-au-Prince until his baccalaureate. At these institutions it is reported he was taught by masters such as Jean Price-Mars, Catts Pressoir and Jean-Chrysostome Dorsainvil. Dumarsais was fifteen when the American Occupation of Haiti began in July 1915 and this period would profoundly influence his teenage years along with his future career. In 1920, he was appointed as a tutor at Lycée Pétion while still attending law school. He taught mathematics there until 1926, also graduating during this time. Dumarsais was dismissed from his position after publicly expressing his opposition to the government of President Louis Borno and the then ongoing United States occupation of Haiti. Dumarsais was described as a scholar (passionate about French literature and philosophy) with a fierce desire to liberate Haiti from foreign influence and change Haitian society. It was necessary, according to him, to fight against the abuses of the traditional elite and educate the masses.

== Early political career ==
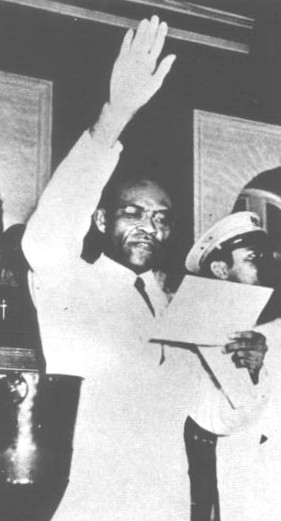
Dumarsais Estimé taking the oath of office in 1946.

=== Election to the Chamber of Deputies ===
As a lawyer, he first practised in St. Marc before entering politics and being elected deputy in 1930 in the constituency of Verrettes. On February 21, 1935, he won the confidence of his colleagues who elected him President of the Chamber of Deputies with 27 votes out of 28.

Minister of Public Instruction, Agriculture and Labour In 1937 he joined President Sténio Vincent’s government and was nominated Minister (Secretary of State, after the former terminology) for Public instruction, Agriculture and Labour, while he kept his seat at the Parliament.

During his two years as the Minister overseeing education, he showed a desire to extend education and culture to all Haitian people, in particular the underprivileged. Pursuing his goal, Estimé cared to improve the level and quality of teachers’ training, to raise the salaries of teachers and professors, to reorganize high schools, and to reform the Haitian baccalaureate and the organization of exams, as well as the introduction of Bachelor of Letters and Bachelor of Sciences university programs. The aim of Dumarsais was a system of education equal to the level of foreign universities which were then offering scholarships for studies abroad to young Haitian men and women. During this time he also ordered the construction of more schools in rural areas and organized the National Library of Port-au-Prince along with its local branches. The Normal School of Female Teachers was created in Port-au-Prince, responding to an important need to promote the socio-economic role of women in Haitian society.

Knowing the importance of the agricultural sector in the national economy, Estimé made sure to provide the Ministry of Agriculture with competent counsellors. The stated objective was to strengthen food crops, but also to develop the cultivation of foodstuffs for export to balance the trade market.

When President Vincent proposed his secretary, Élie Lescot, to the National Assembly as a potential successor in 1941, Estimé voted in his favour and Lescot was elected president. However, on April 19, 1944, Estimé opposed Lescot’s re-election, disapproving of the partial revision of the Constitution undertaken by the president, and voted against him. The latter was, however, re-elected by a majority.

=== Election to the presidency ===
As a deputy, Estimé observed the events of 1946 closely—the economic crisis and a serious social crisis induced by the legitimate demands of the underprivileged classes—which led to the resignation of President Lescot. The provisional government, led by Franck Lavaud, set up for new elections.

While communists and nationalists wanted a regime change, Estimé presented himself to voters as a moderate candidate and was re-elected in the legislative elections of 1946.

On August 16, with the moderates having obtained a majority in the Chamber of Deputies, Estimé was nominated as a candidate. He was then elected President of the Republic for four years after a second vote by deputies, with 31 votes out of 58. His first gesture as the newly elected president was to greet his opponents: Dantès Louis Bellegarde, Edgard Numa, and Demosthenes Calixte.

His ascension to the presidency in 1946 came in the wake of a long period of great effervescence, the culmination of social, political and cultural movements involving students, women, unions and political parties. At the time Haiti was trying to get out of the social and coloured cleavages which have continued to dominate politics since independence and particularly after the American Occupation (1915–1934). The political and economic powers were dominated by a mulatto bourgeoisie which did not favour social mixing. The so-called “Révolution de 1946” was, above all, an attempt to transform Haitian society, but it had to face a lot of resistance.

As a deputy, Estimé observed the events of 1946 closely—the economic crisis and a serious social crisis induced by the legitimate demands of the underprivileged classes—which led to the resignation of President Lescot. The provisional government, led by Franck Lavaud, set up for new elections.

== Presidency ==
Dumarsais Estimé was elected President of the Haitian Republic on August 16, 1946.

In his speech addressed to the National Assembly, Estimé had these words: ‘It is the great family of the masses of which I am a representative that you wanted to honour.’ However, he appealed to everyone’s unity and goodwill: ‘This is the hour when each of us must demonstrate that the Nation is the first and most sacred of concerns.’

Estimé urged morality within the government: ‘If we, the shepherds of the flock, become wolves […] then it will be time to be judged and held accountable.’

His arrival to power was not well received, but over time public opinion rallied, appreciating the gathering of a government of national unity – a rare occurrence in the history of Haiti – bringing together former opponents who were invited to bury the hatchet, such as Georges Rigaud and Daniel Fignolé, and representatives of all social and political tendencies except the communists. The rapid implementation of an ambitious social and economic program which met the needs of the majority, then further finalized public support.

=== 1946 Constitution ===
On November 22, 1946, the National Constituent Assembly, under the chairmanship of Senator Jean Bélizaire, voted on the new Constitution of the Republic of Haiti, following the previous 1935 Constitution.

This new constitution protected fundamental freedoms and guaranteed the rights of the Haitian people. It also established a presidential system under which the President of the Republic, elected for six years, was endowed with a field of competence ranging from the definition of major political orientations to the control of government actions, diplomacy and the army.

The 1946 Constitution introduced the habeas corpus principle. This principle guaranteed that a person under arrest had the right to a quick presentation before a judge, so they could rule on the validity of their arrest. This provision is the basis for the rule of law. This constitution also prohibited extradition for political reasons. It made the separation of the army and the police, as well as annual paid leave, compulsory.

The Constitution of 1946, unlike that of 1935, did not grant the executive power a hand on Legislature, the Judiciary, nor the title of Chief of the Armed Forces for the acting President of the Republic of Haiti.

=== Economic and social reforms ===
Poverty, unemployment, illiteracy, deficient and under-exploited agricultural systems, financial difficulties, endemic diseases, deeply rooted social divisions—these are the difficulties which the government of 1946 had to tackle in the aftermath of the Second World War, which had further worsened Haiti’s economic situation.

It was necessary first to clean up the financial situation and free the Republic of Haiti from financial supervision imposed by the United States following the conventions and protocols forced by the American occupier (1915, 1917 and 1922), and from the 1922 loan, contracted to balance previous loans with the French in 1875, 1896, and 1910. In December 1946, Estimé dispatched to President Harry Truman in Washington a ‘goodwill mission’ composed by the Minister of Finance, Gaston Margron; the Minister of External Relations, Jean Price-Mars; the Minister of Commerce, Georges Rigaud; and the Haitian Ambassador to Washington, Joseph D. Charles. Their objective was to negotiate the terms of a new loan ‘guaranteed by funds set aside by the Tax Department to repay the holders of the 1922–23 loan’. The US government rejected the Haitian request.

In a radio speech on March 25, 1947 (which has gone down in history under the title ‘happy miscounts’), President Estimé called on the Haitian people to help unblock the situation and contribute to the payment of the debt. Some ‘Bons de Libération Financière’ were issued and subscriptions flowed nationwide. Thanks to this popular mobilisation and to a 10-year domestic loan at 5%, the American loan of 1922–23 was repaid and on July 10, 1947, the Republic of Haiti put an end to the financial control of the United States. On October 1, 1947, the National Bank of the Republic of Haiti became a Haitian entity with an entirely Haitian board of directors.

=== Economic development and employment ===
Fighting catastrophic unemployment and raising the standard of living and education for the underprivileged Haitian population was a great priority for Estimé.

With the Haitian State freed from its debt, Estimé embarked on a policy of reviving the economy (Law of July 12, 1947) and administrative and fiscal reforms intended to continue financial consolidation and increase revenue for the State (Law of September 15, 1947, specifying the modalities of budget execution and public accounting; Law of June 23, 1947, establishing a Chamber of Accounts; Law of November 7, 1948, on rental taxes; Law of August 29, 1949, on custom taxation; etc.).

Estimé asked the UN Secretary-General to send a technical mission to assess the general situation of the country and make recommendations in the areas of economics and finance, education, health and culture. The Commission submitted the report (which was published by the UN) so that the government could incorporate the policies into its development plan.

The increase in exports and the prices of agricultural raw materials during this post-war period, notably coffee, sisal and bananas, helped to improve the country’s financial situation. Between 1946 and 1949, the Haitian state budget increased from 46 million to 73 million gourdes, thanks to new tax revenues and profits generated by cement and sugar. At the same time, the public debt fell from 42 million gourdes in 1946 to 40 million gourdes in 1949.

=== Agriculture and rural development ===
The disastrous state of agriculture in Haiti, linked to unfavourable structural factors (small size of family farms, inadequate cultivation methods, deforestation and soil exhaustion, absenteeism of the large landowners who represented about 3% of the population and owned nearly 70% of cultivable land, climatic hazards, etc.) and administrative neglect, was made worse by rural overpopulation, more than three quarters of whom lived below the poverty line.

Aware of the need to fundamentally improve the situation of the agricultural sector and ensure a fresh start for the Haitian economy, and to find solutions to the landless problem, Estimé implemented an integrated approach to agricultural and rural development.

Starting in the summer of 1946, many studies were undertaken and over the following years many projects were carried out, in particular the ODVA (Organisme de Développement de la Vallée de l'Artibonite) financed mainly by a loan of $4 million from the EXIM Bank of the United States. This project was to use the waters of the Artibonite River for methodical agricultural development based on the modern techniques of this region (in particular, rice fields) and the improvement of living for local populations. This development of land, including land suitable for cultivation, also had a positive impact on the exports of certain agricultural goods and therefore on the country’s trade balance. This project continued beyond Estimé’s presidency, after May 1950.

Among the many projects implemented were irrigation and drainage works in the rich valley of the Estère River and others (Los Pozos, Blue Lagoon, Limbé plain, etc.); repair work on certain networks (Momance-Léogâne-Rivière Grise, Plaine du Cul-de-sac, Matheux, Corail Canal, etc.); soil conservation and reforestation projects (La Vallée project, Morne de l'Hôpital project, Mapou-Périsse project, etc.); and the preservation of forest estates .

In 1947 the National Coffee Board was created with the mission to support the activities of small farmers and promote coffee exports. While particular attention was focused on the general improvement of cultivation methods in rural Haiti (i.e. under the Law of October 8, 1949, the possibility to import duty-free, tools, instruments and fertiliser), the promotion and organisation of agricultural cooperatives, and the improved training of agronomists and technicians (National School of Agriculture), Estimé did not have the time to undertake an in-depth agrarian reform to let Haitian peasants own the land.

=== Labour and social affairs ===
While resolutely encouraging private investment to develop the Haitian economy and employment, Estimé attached the utmost importance to a modern and fair labour policy. The Estimé government created the Ministry and the Labour Office in 1946. The increase in the minimum wage level (despite the reluctance of the commercial sector) and the promulgation of the first Labour Code in 1947 are among the notable advances in workers’ rights, alongside the support to create trade unions (law of July 17, 1947) regulating the functioning of trade union associations.

=== Public works ===
Estimé showed his desire to provide the country with the basic infrastructure necessary for its economic development as well as launching a policy of major public works, stimulating job creation: the construction of a new town at the border, Belladère, as a symbol of development facing the Dominican Republic; the construction and repair of roads, bridges (including the suspension bridge of the Grand ’Anse), markets, and drinking water fountains; public buildings; development of provincial towns; and town planning work undertaken in the capital to prepare for the International Exhibition to commemorate the bicentenary of the founding of Port-au-Prince. The lighting of towns became widespread: the Croix-des-Bouquets power plant was inaugurated in 1948, followed by those of Belladère, Port-de-Paix, Jérémie and other cities.

=== 1949 international exhibition ===
The law of July 14, 1948, stipulated that it was necessary for the country to greatly commemorate the bicentenary of the founding of Port-au-Prince in 1949, and to this end that "it was necessary to ensure the execution of the project conceived by the Head of the Executive Power to organise an International Exhibition to be inaugurated in Port-au-Prince in December 1949’. This law specified ‘that from a touristic, agricultural and industrial point of view, the execution of this project (would) be entirely favourable to the country’. This International Exhibition was to promote the rebirth and strengthening of ties between peoples and to stimulate the resumption and development of economic relations between countries, especially since it would be located in "a place in America considered as one of the most important crossroads on the major maritime and air routes on the Atlantic".

The International Exhibition was to have an area of 30 hectares and cover most of the capital’s waterfront by cleaning up this swampy and slum-occupied part of the coast (les Palmistes, Nan Pisquette, Wharf-aux-Herbes) and gaining land on the sea, thanks to the most modern techniques of the time and the collaboration of Haitian, American and Belgian engineers.

Taking only 18 months to organise, which was considered an extraordinary performance, the Exhibition opened on December 8, 1949. It consisted of 56 pavilions and a casino, divided into four sections: National, International, heavy industry and machinery, and attractions. Eighteen countries and nations were represented, to which must be added the United Nations (UN) and the Organization of American States (OAS).

In his inaugural speech of December 8 President Estimé declared: ‘I greet with the deepest sympathy the representatives of these friendly nations, as well as the delegations that have specially come to take part in this feast of peace, and publicly ask them to trust the recognition from the Haitian government and people…’ He further underlined: ‘Although it (the Exhibition) is one of the first stones of a new Haiti, the representation in clear lines and happy images of what we want to do with this country…’ and also added that: ‘It is the work of patience and the skill of hundreds of intellectual and manual workers, both foreigners and Haitians, to whom it is necessary to pay a fair homage, and of the enthusiastic multitudes who animate and support it with their understanding and their passion…’

Foreign firms also participated in the International Exhibition of 1949 in Port-au-Prince. During the preparation of the event, a new legislation was passed to attract foreign direct investment. The law of June 24, 1948, stated that all materials needed for the construction and final installation of hotels would be exempt from import duties for five years. The law of October 8, 1949, granted total or partial tax exemptions to new industries for a maximum of five years, and to industrial companies in general for a maximum of two years, exempting them from the license, the patent, the income tax and the customs duties on import and export.

The economic, cultural and social benefits of the Exhibition were undoubtedly significant. In the tourism sector in particular the number of visitors increased rapidly, from around 2,000 annually before the Exhibition to more than 240,000 in the 1950s.

=== Education ===
The fight against illiteracy, known under the name ‘Program Dumarsais Estimé’, highlighted the presidential desire to educate the urban and rural masses to make them instruments of national development. By virtue of the laws promulgated on August 8, 1947, and November 11, 1949, respectively, the government of the Republic proceeded to reorganise the Department (Ministry) of National Education by creating the positions of Director General and Deputy Director General, following the powers assigned to an Under Secretary of State for National Education under the law of November 23, 1946.

The salaries of teachers and professors were adjusted according to the cost of living. The minimum salary of a teacher, 70 gourdes per month in October 1946, was raised to 100 gourdes in January 1947, reaching the sum of 140 gourdes in October 1947 and 200 gourdes in October 1948. The aim was to make rural education an attractive career for teachers who were trained and capable of handling the problems of rural life.

Under the law of September 29, 1946, the government of the Republic levied 10% of municipal revenue for the construction of public schools. Between February 1947 and May 1949, 23 public schools were built by order of the Head of State, while development and expansion works were carried out on school buildings in the capital and the province.

In October 1946 there were only 623 teachers for 362 rural schools. By May 1949, the number of teachers assigned to rural education had reached 823, an increase of 34% which clearly reflected ‘the special attention to proletarian and peasant youth’ according to the outline of the presidential speech of August 16, 1946. During this same period, more than forty schools and farm schools had been built in rural areas, allowing several thousand Haitians to benefit from education and therefore shape the goals of the president’s education policy for children in need.

In the same vein, secondary education was not neglected, as proved by the founding of the Lycee Toussaint Louverture in the Morne-à-Tuff area in the capital and the opening of a high school in Hinche and the Faustin Soulouque high school in Petit-Goâve, in accordance with the laws of September 9 and 30, 1946. The high schools of the capital, Cayes and Cap-Haitien, were also renovated. In 1947, the executive passed the law of July 24, authorising the creation of the Ecole Normale Supérieure, a public utility institution dedicated to the intellectual training of secondary school teachers.

Less than two months later, the government of the Republic created the Ecole Polytechnique d’Haiti, a higher education institution dedicated to the training of engineers and architects, deemed essential for the construction and renovation of national structures.

=== Health ===
Along with education, the government of Estimé wanted to remove the obstacles towards primary health care for the population.

A vast and comprehensive plan was gradually implemented involving the equipping of hospitals and laboratories, the multiplication of health centres, the development of rural medicine and hygiene, the reorganisation of the Faculty of Medicine, dentistry and pharmacy. Thanks to a cooperation agreement with France, a number of French medical professors came to teach at the Faculty of Medicine to make up for the lack of Haitian professors who had resigned following the events of early 1946.

Campaigns against yaws, malaria, child and endemic diseases were also launched, along with projects to improve public hygiene and fight against malnutrition and tuberculosis. The laws of September 27 and October 8, 1949, provided for the training of managers and technical staff, as well as the organisation of public health services throughout the country.

=== Foreign policy ===
The Haitian foreign policy of President Estimé can be described with five main focus points:

- The alliance with the United States
- Inter-American solidarity
- The firm adherence of the Republic of Haiti to the principles set out by the United Nations (UN) and the Organization of American States (OAS)
- Support for decolonisation and the rights of peoples to self-determination
- Respect for the principle of non-intervention in the internal affairs of other countries

By a law dated November 27, 1946, the government of Estimé reorganised the diplomatic and consular service of Haiti, as well as strengthening the relations with the other countries on the American continent. On July 15, 1948, the Haitian government signed a trade agreement with its Venezuelan counterpart, which defined the broad lines of economic cooperation between the two. With the law of September 6, 1949, Haiti established formal diplomatic relations with Guatemala. On August 22, 1947, diplomatic and consular relations were established between Haiti and the Republic of Panama. In September 1947, the Haitian representatives signed in Rio de Janeiro, then the capital of Brazil, the Inter-American Treaty of Mutual Assistance. In April 1948 the plenipotentiary envoys of Haiti signed in Washington, D.C. the Charter of the Organization of American States, which promoted new relations between the nations of this continent.

Historical ties were strengthened with the United States of America, for bilateral relations. The government of Dumarsais Estimé had signed the decree of May 13, 1949, authorising the presence of an American Naval Mission in Haiti. A contract favourable to the exploitation of bauxite was signed on November 12, 1946, between representatives of the Haitian government and those of the Reynolds Refining Corp, an American mining company.

As a testament to the interest shown in Haitian-Dominican relations, the government of Estimé raised the Haitian diplomatic representation in the Dominican Republic to the rank of an embassy (law of April 25, 1947). On August 22, 1947, Estimé elevated the Haitian representation to the Holy See to the rank of a diplomatic mission.

On the instructions of President Estimé, Emile St.-Lot, at the time permanent representative of the Republic of Haiti to the UN, voted in favour of the creation of the State of Israel on November 29, 1947. Haiti also became an active member of UNESCO and joined the GATT (General Agreement on Customs Tariff and Trade) in 1947.

=== Extension of presidential mandate ===
On July 1, 1949, the legislature approved a law completely revising the Constitution. One of the articles to be amended, concerned the end of the president’s term fixed on May 15, 1952. This article caused much controversy. The opposition understood that the real purpose of the draft amendment was to extend the term of office of the head of state, contrary to the provisions of the 1946 Constitution, which stipulated that the president ‘could not under any circumstances benefit from extension of the mandate’. This constitutional provision ensured political alternations while reducing presidential power. The legislative elections had been set for January 10, 1950. Public opinion began to stir, and tension mounted as the date approached. A decree on November 14, 1949, re-established the state of siege which had been in effect from March to October. This measure was considered contrary to the Constitution, which only authorised it ‘in cases of civil disturbance, or imminent invasion by a foreign force.’ The same day, students of the Faculty of Medicine and Polytechnic began a strike for the restoration of public freedoms which they considered compromised. The government attributed this movement to the subversive activities of the People’s Socialist Party (PSP) and the Popular Workers’ Movement (MOP), allied to the Social Christian Party (PSC), declared the dissolution of these parties, and closed their newspapers.

=== Senate sack ===
The newly elected deputies showed themselves willing to support the plans of the executive, while the Senate still refused any form of constitutional revision. It was a stand-off between the upper house, the Senate, and the executive allied to the lower house, the Chamber of Deputies. The head of state and his supporters could not agree to see their plan thwarted. On the morning of May 8, 1950, a crowd invaded the Senate chamber, ransacking it. The crowd then took to the streets, uttering death threats against some senators and personalities accused of treason. In his message to the people that same evening, the president did not explicitly disavow the demonstrators: ‘Your eloquent attitude this morning […] testifies to your political maturity and your direct participation in your affairs. However, he invited them ‘to calm, order and respect the law.’

== Military coup and exile ==
The army was quick to react. Two days later, on May 10, it made a declaration signed by General Franck Lavaud and Colonels Antoine Levelt and Paul-Eugène Magloire: ‘The President of the Republic has lost control of events […]. By unanimous agreement of the officers, the members of the 1946 junta were asked to once again agree to devote themselves to the sake of the Nation.’ It was the end of the government of Dumarsais Estimé.

A commando of officers and heavily armed soldiers infested the National Palace. ‘The High Staff preceded by Colonel Magloire and his officers from the Dessalines Barracks, armed with machine guns, entered the president’s office and asked him to sign his letter of resignation” which they had previously prepared. President Estimé complied.

Assigned to residence with his family for ten days in a villa made available to him in Port-au-Prince, he was forced to leave. The couple and their three young children took the path of exile.

== Life in exile and death ==
After a brief stay in the United States, the family moved to France and stayed there for a few months. To get closer to Haiti, Estimé then opted for Jamaica, which he reached with his family on January 23, 1951, via ‘Colombia’, a liner belonging to the Compagnie Générale Transatlantique.

On their arrival at the port of Kingston, the Jamaican Immigration Service forbid them to put foot on land, at the request of the Haitian government chaired since October 1950 by Paul Magloire, on the pretext that the ex-president could cause troubles in Jamaica. In fact, Magloire feared the presence of Estimé so close to Haiti and had sent his henchmen (including a certain Lucien Chauvet) to convince the British and Jamaican authorities (Jamaica was not yet independent) to refuse ex-President Estimé and his family refuge in Jamaica.

However, Alexander Bustamante, head of the Jamaica Labour Party (PLP), mayor of Kingston [and unofficial head of government until his official appointment in 1953 as the first Chief Minister of Jamaica], outraged to see his country let its conduct be dictated in matters of asylum and reception of foreigners by a foreign government, intervened quickly with the British Governor of Jamaica and the Chief of Police to have this ban lifted. Mr. Bustamante boarded the Colombia to greet ex-President Estimé, whom he knew, and to assure him that he would be protected in Jamaica. When he got off the boat with his family, he was driven to the hotel and, a few days later, they were invited to stay in Bustamante’s home on Tucker Avenue where they resided for several weeks.

After a year spent in Jamaica, Estimé returned to France where he lived until November 1952. He then left France for New York where he died on July 20, 1953, in Columbia Presbyterian Hospital.

Political offices
Preceded by Franck Lavaud	President of Haiti; 1946–50	Succeeded by Franck Lavaud
