= Popular Socialist Party (Haiti) =

Communist party in Haiti

- French name: Parti socialiste populaire
- Haitian Creole name: Pati sosyalis popilè
- Abbreviation: PSP
- Leader: Max Hudicourt
- Founded: January 1946
- Banned: March 1947
- Newspaper: La Nation
- Ideology: Communism; Marxism
- Political position: Far-left

The Popular Socialist Party (PSP) (Note: French: Parti socialiste populaire; Haitian Creole: Pati sosyalis popilè) was a communist party in Haiti. It was one of the two major political parties on the Haitian left during the 1940s and 1950s, the other being the Haitian Communist Party (PCH). The PSP was led by Max Hudicourt, a Marxist, and its membership consisted mostly of Haitians of mixed descent, known as mulattos. This was in contrast to the black-majority PCH, and the left's main rival at the time, the black nationalist noiristes.

The PSP was formed amid a revival of the political opposition that followed the ouster of President Élie Lescot and his cabinet in January 1946. The party contested and lost the May parliamentary election later that year, with the noiristes winning the most seats. In the indirect presidential election between parliamentarians, the PSP abandoned its candidate Georges Rigaud and instead supported the main non-noiriste candidate, Edgar Néré Numa, who lost to Dumarsais Estimé. Estimé initially tried to form a coalition government and included Rigaud in his first cabinet, but pressure from the military and bourgeoisie led to Estimé persecuting the left, including the PSP.

== History ==
=== Background and founding ===
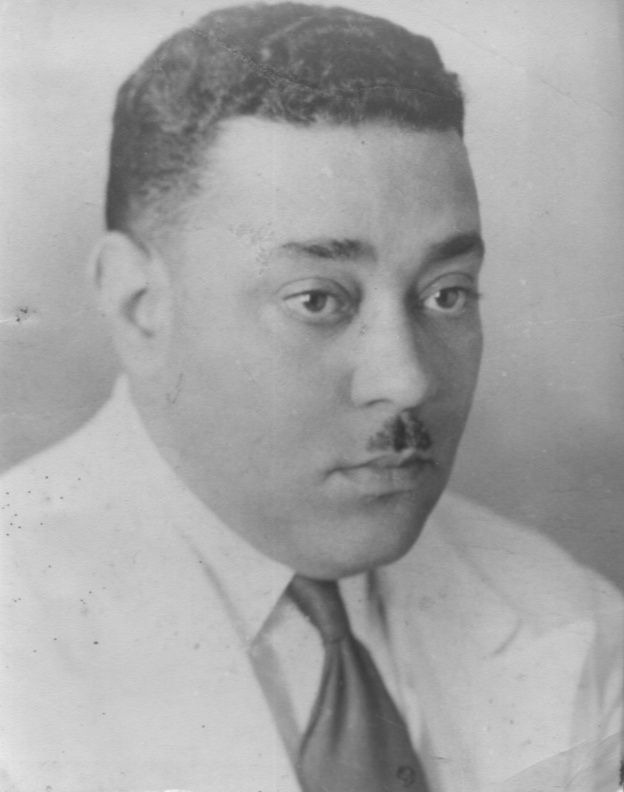
Max Hudicourt in an undated photograph

Communist organizations in Haiti were suppressed during the presidency of Sténio Vincent from 1930 to 1941, and then Élie Lescot from 1941 to 1946. The Marxist student activist Max Hudicourt was among those on the left who were persecuted during the Haitian Red Scare of the 1930s. He formed a broad progressive organization, Democratic Reaction, along with several other student leaders in 1932. He was a friend of Jacques Roumain, a committed Marxist–Leninist who founded and led the first iteration of the Haitian Communist Party (PCH) from 1934 to 1936. Hudicourt was imprisoned multiple times during the Vincent presidency and fled to New York City in 1938 to avoid arrest amid anti-government demonstrations.

On 11 January 1946, Lescot and his cabinet were overthrown by the country's military, amid student protests against Lescot's authoritarian rule. Hudicourt returned from exile two days later, and the PSP was formed later the same month, with Hudicourt as its leader. The party membership was mostly mulatto, in contrast to the predominantly black composition of the PCH, the other major Haitian communist party of the time. Other leading party members included Étienne Charlier, who had co-authored the program of the original PCH with Roumain; and Max D. Sam, grandson of the 16th Haitian president Tirésias Simon Sam and the editor of La Nation, which became the PSP's newspaper.

=== 1946 election ===
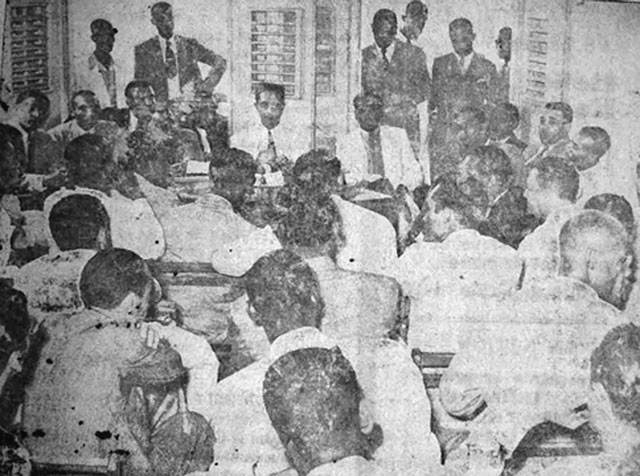
PSP meeting at the party headquarters in 1947. Étienne Charlier and Max D. Sam are seated at the head of the table.

The PSP ran several candidates for the Chamber of Deputies in the 12 May 1946 parliamentary election, including the party's entire executive consisting of Hudicourt, Charlier, Sam, Georges Rigaud, and René Salomon. Rigaud was the PSP's nominee for president, who was at the time elected by the Senate. In the run-up to the election, the PCH derided the PSP as fake leftists who avoided discussions of race because mulattos made up a majority of its membership and the entirety of its leadership. Although the PSP was ostensibly a communist party, Hudicourt had previously expressed his ideological flexibility and renounced communism (although likely under duress) during his trials in the 1930s.

Aside from the PSP and PCH, two other parties competed for the leftist vote: the Haitian Socialist Party (PSH) and the Maoist Communist Party (PCM). As a result of their disunity, Haiti's leftist parties lost the election to the noiristes, whose rhetoric focused on black emancipation from mulatto minority rule. Conceding that it was unlikely Rigaud, a mulatto, would win the presidential vote amid the political climate at the time, the PSP decided to instead throw its support behind Edgar Néré Numa, a black conservative representing Les Cayes. Although Numa was not a socialist, the PSP officially supported him because he was a Haitian nationalist whose goals aligned with some of the party's. He also had no direct ties to the noiristes, and was therefore viewed by the PSP as a realistic alternative. The PSP's opponents accused the party of attempting politique de doublure, with Numa as the public-facing black candidate and the mulatto leadership of the PSP pulling the strings behind the scenes.

Numa's main challenger was Dumarsais Estimé, whose political career Hudicourt publicly criticized as contradictory. When Estimé was a university professor in the 1920s, he proposed that a wall be built around the Champ de Mars to separate the mulatto elite from the "authentic" black Haitians below the park. Estimé was nonetheless married to a mulatto member of the bourgeoisie, and was personally close to Sténio Vincent during his presidency. The parliament ultimately elected Estimé as president on 16 August.

=== Estimé presidency ===
Estimé initially tried to appease the opposition parties by forming a coalition government with them. Several oppositions leaders received cabinet positions, including Rigaud, who was appointed minister of commerce. However, the military, with the support of black nationalists and conservatives within the bourgeoisie, pressured Estimé into making a rightward turn in policy. An anti-communist law was enacted in March 1947, and the PSP's leadership went into hiding.

=== 1957 election ===
The PSP supported the unsuccessful presidential bid of Louis Déjoie in the 22 September 1957 general election. Déjoie was an agronomist, industrialist, and member of the mulatto bourgeoisie.

== Ideology ==
The PSP's ideology and structure were modeled after those of the Cuban Popular Socialist Party and Dominican Popular Socialist Party.

The party regarded class struggle as the most important contradiction (conflict) in Haitian society, rather than the racial divide between black and mulatto Haitians. This was in line with the program of the first PCH of the 1930s under Roumain, but in contrast to the second PCH of the 1940s. This position also stood in opposition to the black nationalist line of the noiristes.
