= Haitian Communist Party =

Political party in Haiti (1934–1947)

- Logo of the party from 1946 to 1947
- French name: Parti communiste haïtien
- Haitian Creole name: Pati kominis ayisyen
- Abbreviation: PCH
- Leader: Jacques Roumain (1934–1936); Felix Dorléans Juste Constant (1946–1947)
- Founded: 1934
- Dissolved: 22 April 1947
- Preceded by: Anti-Imperialist League
- Newspaper: Vigie (1936); Combat (1946–1947)
- Membership (1946): 1,307
- Ideology: Communism; Marxism–Leninism
- Political position: Far-left
- Slogan: "Colour is nothing, class is everything" (1934–1936)

The Haitian Communist Party (French: Parti communiste haïtien, abbreviated PCH) (Note: Haitian Creole: Pati kominis ayisyen) was a Marxist–Leninist political party in Haiti. The party had two incarnations: the first founded in 1934 and led by Jacques Roumain, and the second founded in 1946 and led by Felix Dorléans Juste Constant.

The party under Roumain was committed to Marxism–Leninism, focusing on Haiti's class struggle and regarding the racial divisions in Haitian society as a less important byproduct of it. President Sténio Vincent and his government persecuted the PCH and other groups on the left, culminating in Roumain's arrest and exile from Haiti in 1936. The PCH consequently fell into decline, with only minor attempts at clandestine activity.

Roumain returned to Haiti in 1941, intending to reconstitute the PCH. However, a weakened PCH base and the threat of another arrest convinced Roumain to abandon his plan and take a government position under the new president, Élie Lescot. Roumain was expected by his colleagues to turn on Lescot and lead the PCH again after the Lescot government began persecuting the left; however, Roumain died from existing health problems before he could. After Lescot and his government were overthrown in 1946, the PCH was reestablished, but with different leadership, membership, and direction.

Juste Constant, a close friend of Roumain's, led the party's second incarnation. Unlike Roumain's traditional following of Marxism–Leninism, the PCH under Juste Constant considered for a time that race was an important factor in Haiti's class struggle, rather than a reflection of it. The party was unable to gain popular support amid a rise in support for the noiristes, and was defeated in one national election before disbanding in 1947.

== History ==
=== Founding and original program ===
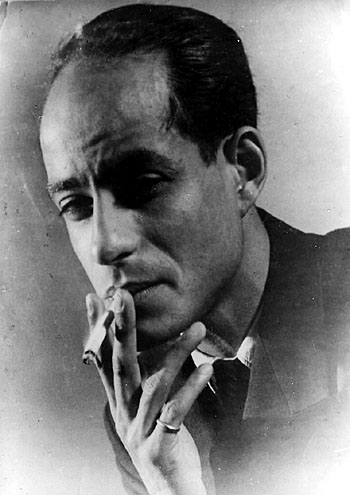
Jacques Roumain in 1942

The end of the United States occupation of Haiti in 1934 motivated a group of young communists in the Haitian capital Port-au-Prince to establish the Haitian Communist Party (French: Parti communiste haïtien, PCH) shortly thereafter. Among the PCH's founders was the Marxist writer Jacques Roumain, who would become the party's first leader. The PCH replaced the Anti-Imperialist League, which Roumain had created a few months prior with fellow communist Georges Petit. The party's first iteration subscribed to a traditional interpretation of Marxism–Leninism.

The PCH's central committee published the party's political program, titled The Schematic Analysis, 1932–1934, (Note: Original French title: L'Analyse schématique 32–34) in June 1934. It was the first Marxist critique of Haitian society, co-authored by Roumain and Étienne Charlier, a core party member who had been educated in Paris. It was split into two sections, the first critiquing the Haitian nationalist movement and the second analyzing anti-black racism in Haiti from a Marxist perspective.

In the first section, Roumain argued that the nationalist movement failed to liberate Haitians because its goals contradicted those of the nationalist bourgeoisie due to class struggle. He posited that anti-imperialist Haitians must fight against capitalism both abroad and at home. Roumain continued in the second section by proposing that the racial conflict between black and mulatto (Note: French: mulâtre; Haitian Creole: milat) (mixed) Haitians was in fact a manifestation of the class struggle. He argued that, while a mostly mulatto bourgeoisie oppressed a black proletariat and petite bourgeoisie, race alone could not explain the social hierarchy. Roumain contended that other politicians were using race to obfuscate the more pressing issue of class struggle. The program concluded by calling for the proletariat to unite against the bourgeoisie, regardless of skin color, under the slogan "colour is nothing, class is everything".

The establishment of the PCH alarmed the Haitian authorities, who began a crackdown on leftists in August 1934. Roumain was arrested and charged with treason based on a letter he had sent to a Haitian communist living in New York City, in which he requested "matériel". The authorities interpreted "matériel" to mean explosives, but Roumain had in fact been asking for purchased literature related to the convictions of the Scottsboro Boys of Alabama, whose release he had been supporting. The court nonetheless convicted him and sentenced him to three years in prison. President Sténio Vincent later pardoned Roumain in 1936, and Roumain subsequently left Haiti for Europe on 15 August, in what would become a five-year-long, self-imposed exile.

=== First decline and attempted revival by Roumain ===
The PCH faltered after Roumain's departure, despite attempts by its young cadres to continue the party's work. Party members attempted but failed to form a network of clandestine cells concentrated in the communes of Gonaïves and Les Cayes. A communist-led labor union of bus operators created in late 1936 was quickly suppressed by the authorities by early 1937. A theoretical journal, Vigie ("lookout"), was also short-lived. These activities, while relatively minor, convinced Vincent to adopt a hardline anti-communist stance. In November 1936, he issued a presidential decree against so-called "violent" and "anarchistic" communism, threatening its supporters with up to one year in prison and a fine.

Roumain returned to the Caribbean in 1940, residing in neighboring Cuba for an extended period. Inspired by the well-organized Cuban communists, Roumain attempted to revive the PCH under his leadership. He returned to Haiti on 17 May 1941, a few days after Vincent was replaced by Élie Lescot. Roumain found himself alienated from the Port-au-Prince working class due to his five-year self-exile, and a schism formed in June between Roumain and the more moderate socialists that had been part of the PCH. Roumain was also fearful of being arrested again, and an August police seizure of communist literature he had ordered convinced him to give up his hopes of reorganizing the PCH.

Lescot sought to pacify and isolate Roumain by offering him a government position, and Roumain ultimately accepted the role of Haitian chargé d'affaires to Mexico in October 1942. This surprised many of Roumain's colleagues, particularly the socialists of the former PCH. Trinidadian scholar of the Francophone Caribbean Michael Dash proposes that Roumain may have taken the position because his fellow communists believed there was value in having prominent Marxists in public office. Roumain also shared Lescot's support for the Soviet Red Cross and strong opposition to Nazi Germany.

In 1944, Lescot unilaterally extended his presidential term and postponed legislative elections, prompting Roumain to return to Haiti on 7 August of that year to challenge Lescot. Haitian communists, whose numbers had grown since Lescot took office, hoped that Roumain would disavow Lescot and reform the PCH. However, Roumain, who had already been sick for many years due to malaria he had contracted in prison, died suddenly on 18 August.

=== Second iteration under Juste Constant ===
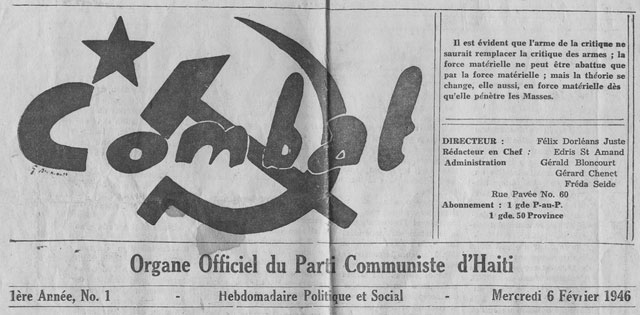
Masthead of the first issue of Combat

Amid student protests against his authoritarian rule, Lescot and his cabinet were overthrown and exiled by the Haitian military on 11 January 1946. Crucially to the communists, the bans on political parties, independent press, and unions were lifted. Believing Lescot's ouster to be a pivotal moment akin to the Russian Revolution, Edris Saint-Armand led a group of former PCH members and other Marxists in reconstituting the PCH in early February. They launched a new daily newspaper, Combat and adopted a red star and hammer and sickle as their logo.

The party adopted a radical new program that argued for, among other things, the establishment of a "Haitian Socialist Soviet Republic", the adoption of Soviet-style political structures, the collectivization of all land and industries, and the renaming of the military to the "People's Army". Cuba's communists severely criticized the program as unrealistic and not in sync with the international communist movement, going so far as to deride their Haitian counterparts as "infantile leftists". The Cubans retained their disapproval even after the Haitians revised and moderated their program. The PCH also failed to gain recognition from the Soviet Union or support from the Communist Party USA, which had regional influence in North America.

While the new PCH was ostensibly following the ideas of Roumain, the party membership did not include his closest ideological allies. The new party leadership included Saint-Armand and Felix Dorléans Juste Constant, who became the party's president. An Episcopalian preacher and close friend of Roumain's, Juste Constant forfeited his parish upon assuming the party's top leadership role.

The PCH was one of eleven groups that formed the Haitian Revolutionary Front (French: Front révolutionnaire haïtien, FRH) on 8 February 1946. A progressive coalition, Juste Constant served as one of its vice-presidents. The front held marches and protests, with supporters singing The Internationale and La Dessalinienne. However, the front was dominated by noiristes who disliked Marxism and fundamentally disagreed with the communists in regard to whether race or class was the primary issue in Haiti. Consequently, the PCH left the front on 23 March.

Unlike its first iteration, the PCH under Juste Constant broke from traditional Marxist–Leninist ideas and argued that race was an integral part of the class struggle in Haiti (although it remained opposed to the idea that race was the primary issue in the country). The predominantly black PCH was accordingly critical of the mulatto communists leading its main rival on the left, the Popular Socialist Party (PSP). The PCH and PSP nonetheless worked together to establish unions. In the run-up to the 12 May 1946 parliamentary election, the PCH would abandon its line in regard to race, in response to the growing influence of the noiristes.

In the May election, Juste Constant simultaneously ran for president (through the Chamber of Deputies election), senator, and mayor of Port-au-Prince. The People's Democratic Party of Young Haitians, a leftist party that had also been a part of the FRH, was the only other party that supported Juste Constant's presidential bid. The Haitian left was disunited against the noiristes, and the left's politically diverse slate of candidates lost the election decisively. While Juste Constant was voted into parliament, his fellow parliamentarians elected Dumarsais Estimé as president. The PCH and PSP consequently formed an alliance named the National Defence Committee (French: Comité de Défense Nationale, CDN), which demanded new elections and a civilian provisional government to lead the country until then. The CDN threatened a general strike to achieve its goals. The CDN's formation concerned but did not move the military authorities, who dissolved the CDN in their crackdown against anti-Estimé protesters.

=== Second decline and dissolution ===
In March 1947, a report titled "Communism in Haiti" was sent to the British foreign minister, claiming the Soviet Union was infiltrating the Haitian political scene in an attempt to spark a race war and Sovietize the country. The British at the time were cautious of communism arriving in their neighboring Colony of Jamaica, which they were in the process of granting self-governance. The report contained several exaggerations about the PCH, such as the claim that 90 percent of Haitian youth were PCH members and that the PCH had received significant funds from the Soviets through the Cuban and Mexican communist parties. The US embassy in Haiti criticized the report amid external exaggerations of communism's influence in the country.

In contrast to the report's claims, the PCH was in fact in a period of decline when the report surfaced. The departure of several youths from the party leadership lessened the appeal of the PCH among young intelligentsia, and Juste Constant resigned as party leader on 10 March 1947, after the circulation of a pro-Estimé pamphlet that was falsely attributed to him. The PCH formally dissolved itself on 22 April 1947, amid a rise in financial debts, pressure from domestic opponents, and anti-communist persecution in the Caribbean.

A number of PCH leaders continued their activism after the dissolution of the party, and in January 1948 they attempted to reconstitute the PCH by establishing the communist Haitian Progressive Workers Party. Although the party garnered some support from workers, it was banned a month after its founding as a consequence of a new anti-communist law being passed by the Haitian senate.

== Membership ==
The PCH had a self-reported 98% black membership in 1934. The party's second iteration was predominantly black and middle-class, and reported 1,307 registered members in 1946, although British professor of Caribbean history Michael J. Smith states this figure was likely inflated.

== Affiliates ==
The PCH had significant influence over the Federation of Haitian Workers, one of the four major labor unions in Haiti during the 1940s.

== See also ==
- Haitian Socialist Party
- Haitian Workers' Party
- Unified Party of Haitian Communists
