= Max Hudicourt =

Haitian socialist politician (1907–1947)

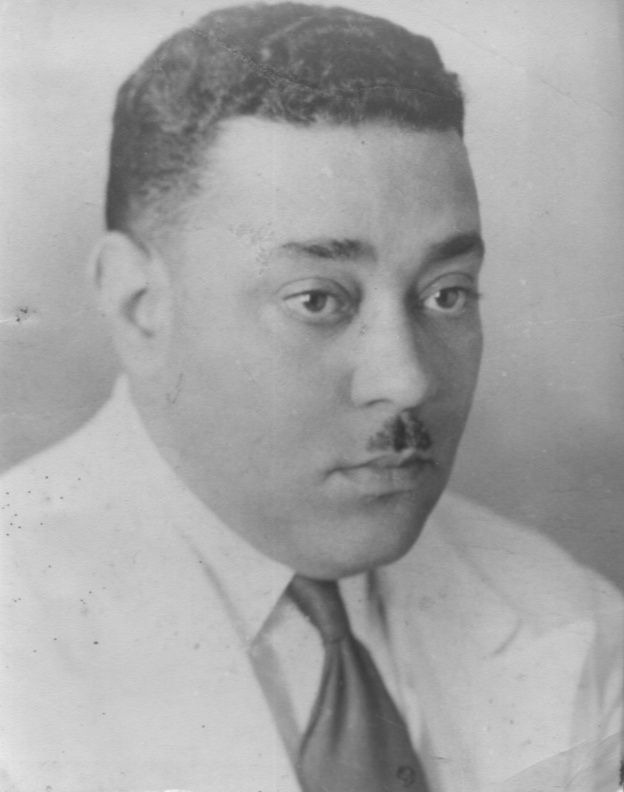
- Portrait of Max Hudicourt

Personal details
- Born: June 25, 1907 Port-au-Prince, Haiti
- Died: May 4, 1947 (aged 39) Port-au-Prince, Haiti
- Party: Popular Socialist Party
- Spouse(s): 1) Marie Bellegarde; 2) Julie Bartoli
- Occupation: Politician, journalist, activist
- Profession: Lawyer

Max Lélio Hudicourt (French pronunciation: [maks leljo ydikuʁ]; June 25, 1907 – May 4, 1947) was a Haitian lawyer, journalist and leading communist politician.

Hudicourt was born in Port-au-Prince to an elite light-skinned family, but spent his childhood in Jérémie, his mother's hometown. He moved to Port-au-Prince to pursue a higher education and attend Law School. He was strongly influenced during those years by his uncle and mentor Pierre Hudicourt, with whom he lived, and who was a lawyer and Senator. He became politically active during the 1920s, becoming known as a gifted orator and contributor to leftist publications. When he graduated from law school, he worked in his uncle's law firm.

In 1933 occupying US Marines sought to rid Haiti of Marxist influence, launching a campaign for "The Suppression of Bolshevist Activities". Hudicourt was arrested, tried, and sentenced to three months in prison for purportedly being a communist along with Jacques Roumain. After his trial, Hudicourt made clear that while he identified the ideology's principles he was not personally a communist. A hunger strike and international attention won him and Roumain early releases from prison.

He continued to be an outspoken dissident against President Sténio Vincent, who he felt betrayed Haiti's nationalist movement by allying with the United States after the Marines withdrew. When Vincent declared his regime a dictatorship in 1938, Hudicourt helped organize a large demonstrations to which the authorities responded with severe repression. As protest leaders were rounded up and jailed, Hudicourt narrowly escaped arrest by fleeing to New York.

When he returned two years later after Élie Lescot succeeded Vincent in the presidency, he was immediately put under police surveillance. In 1941 he criticized a police chief while campaigning for a congressional seat. The police attacked him, beating him up, and Hudicourt was again exiled to the Dominican Republic and then New York.

He returned in 1942 after negotiations and was allowed to print a daily socialist newspaper called La Nation. He financed the paper from his own funds, raised from a small Pétion-Ville moviehouse he co-owned. It became the longest running Marxist daily in Haitian history and was widely circulated among literate urban workers.

Hudicourt accepted a minor diplomatic post in the Haitian government but subsequently refused to fulfill it in protest of President Lescot's dictates. Lescot barred him from the country. La Nation was shut down for "sowing hate and fomenting troubles".

As Haitian police and the FBI kept close watch on the faltering Haitian leftist movement, Hudicourt continued his political activity from exile in Harlem, New York. He attacked the Lescot government and US policy in the Caribbean and networked with other progressive intellectuals. His works from exile include "Haiti Faces Tomorrow's Peace" (1945) and "The Triumph of Fascism: Or the Haitian-American Mutual Responsibilities in Haitian Affairs" (1945).

After Lescot was exiled amidst a popular revolution, Hudicourt returned to lead Parti Socialiste Populaire (Haiti) (PSP)". In 1946 he was elected as the PSP's candidate to Haiti's Chamber of Deputies, becoming the only sitting socialist politician. He was part of a 1947 failed high-level delegation to the United States to secure the forgiveness of occupation-era loans and debts.

In May of that year, Hudicourt was found slumped at his desk with a gunshot wound to his chest and revolver in hand. His apparent suicide was a total surprise to his allies in the PSP. Theories abounded that he was assassinated by political opponents or US agents, but his close friends said his death was the coda to a severe month-long depression. A draft article for La Nation naming corrupt civil and military officials lay on his desk.

Some months later the newspaper was raided and sacked by the Haitian police. His brother and other socialists assumed leadership of the PSP, which continued to spearhead leftist opposition to the Haitian government.

He married twice, to Marie Bellegarde (daughter of his next door neighbor, Dantès Bellegarde) and Julie Bartoli but left no children from either wife.
