= Haitian Socialist Party =

Political party in Haiti

Haitian Socialist Party Parti socialiste haïtien
- Abbreviation: PSH
- Leader: René Salomon
- Founded: February 1946
- Newspaper: Classe Moyen et Masse
- Ideology: Socialism; Marxism; Black nationalism
- Political position: Left-wing

The Haitian Socialist Party (French: Parti socialiste haïtien, abbreviated PSH) was a minor political party on the Haitian left, active during the latter half of the 1940s. It was founded in 1946 by René Salomon, a Marxist intellectual and the grandson of Lysius Salomon, who served as the 13th president of Haiti from 1879 to 1888. The party contested and lost one election, the parliamentary election in 1946.

Unlike other Haitian leftist groups of the time, the PSH adopted black nationalist positions similar to those held by the rival noiristes. The PSH advocated the establishment of a renewed, socialist Haiti led by black Haitians. The noiristes ultimately won the 1946 election because it had gained the support of the working class in Port-au-Prince, whose vote the PSH failed to court.

== History ==
René Salomon, a self-declared Marxist and the grandson of the 13th president of Haiti Lysius Salomon, established the PSH in February 1946, in the run-up to the 12 May 1946 parliamentary election. He was well known among Haitian intellectuals of the time and was the founder of the Cenacle des études, a political discussion group active during the presidency of Élie Lescot. The party membership accordingly consisted of intellectuals and writers.

In contrast to other parties on the Haitian left, the PSH incorporated the black nationalist ideas of the rival noiristes into its socialist program. The PSH idolized the Haitian revolutionary leader Toussaint Louverture and declared in its 7 April manifesto that the upcoming election would be the first opportunity since the 1806 assassination of Jean-Jacques Dessalines, another Haitian revolutionary leader, to create a nation governed by black Haitians for black Haitians. The party echoed these sentiments in the 1 May (International Workers' Day) issue of its organ, Classe Moyen et Masse ("The Middle Class and Masses").

The PSH and the broader Haitian left lost the 12 May election by a landslide to the noiristes, who won the working class vote in the capital Port-au-Prince. The PSH blamed the leftists' loss on their disunity.

== See also ==
- Haitian Communist Party
- Popular Socialist Party (Haiti)
