= Philippe Thoby-Marcelin =

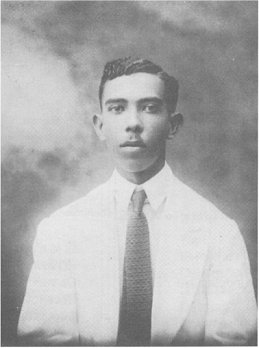
- Thoby-Marcelin as a student in 1920
- Born: December 11, 1904; Port-au-Prince, Haiti
- Died: August 13, 1975 (aged 70); Cazenovia, New York
- Occupations: Poet, novelist, journalist, folklorist, politician
- Writing career
- Notable works: Canapé-Vert, La Bête de Musseau, Le Crayon de Dieu, Contes et Légendes d'Haïti
- Notable awards: Literary Prize of Latin America

Philippe Thoby-Marcelin (1904–1975), was a Haitian poet, novelist, journalist, folklorist and politician.

== Early life ==
Philippe Thoby-Marcelin was born December 11, 1904, in Port-au-Prince. He and his younger brother, Pierre Marcelin (1908-?), worked together on the writing of several novels about rural Haiti, highlighting the themes of peasant life and Haitian folklore.

Philippe went to high school in Port-au-Prince and finished his education in Paris where he studied law. While there, he became acquainted with Valery Larbaud, who arranged to have some of his poems published in La revue européenne, a monthly literary journal that was published from 1923 to 1931. Back in Haiti, he began his career as general secretary at the Ministry of Public Works. Like most Haitian intellectuals, he was opposed to the American occupation of Haiti, which had been established in 1915.

In 1927, together with Jacques Roumain, Carl Brouard, Émile Roumer and Normil Sylvain (1900–1929), he helped create La Revue Indigène, a literary journal in which they published their poems. They idea was to honor the indigenous Haitian literary and artistic material, and return the culture to its pre-occupational state. His first novel, Canapé-Vert, was published in 1944.

In 1946, he participated in the founding of the short-lived Popular Socialist Party (PSP), together with Anthony Lespès. That same year he published his second novel, La Bête de Musseau, translated as The Beast of the Haitian Hills. In 1948, when the PSP was declared illegal by President Dumarsais Estimé, he moved to the United States, where he worked as a translator for the Pan-American Union.

His third novel, Le Crayon de Dieu, appeared in 1952. His last novel, Tous les Hommes sont Fous was published in 1972 and translated into English by his wife, Eva.

He died at his home in Cazenovia, near Syracuse, New York, in 1975.

== Biographies ==
- Philippe Thoby-Marcelin and Pierre Marcelin, Canapé-Vert, the French Publishing House, New York: 1944
- Philippe Thoby-Marcelin and Pierre Marcelin, La Bête de Musseau, Editions of the French House, New York: 1946
- Philippe Thoby-Marcelin and Pierre Marcelin, Le Crayon de Dieu, Editions La Table Ronde, Paris: 1952
- Philippe Thoby-Marcelin, Contes et Légendes d'Haïti, Editions Fernand Nathan, Paris: 1967
- Philippe Thoby-Marcelin and Pierre Marcelin, Tous les Hommes sont Fous, New Optical Publishing, Montreal, Quebec: 1980
