= Société Haitiano-Américaine de Développement Agricole =

Joint agricultural venture between the United States of America and Haiti

The Société Haïtiano-Américane de Développement Agricole, also known as SHADA, was a joint venture between the United States of America and Haiti to expand wartime production of rubber in the Haitian countryside. This program was established in 1941 and ran until it was largely discontinued in 1944.

== Background ==
During the outbreak of World War II, an axis blockade cut off American rubber supplies from Malaya and the Dutch East Indies. In 1939, the United States Department of Agriculture began a program to develop rubber production in the tropical Americas. Haitian president Sténio Vincent requested an agricultural advisor from the United States, and on the recommendations of Thomas Barbour and David Fairchild, Thomas A. Fennell was selected and was sent to Haiti. In 1940, Harold F. Loomis of the USDA conducted a rubber survey of Haiti, and the Haitian Ministry of Agriculture agreed to set up rubber experimental station. The USDA then sent Harley Harris Bartlett to bring Hevea brasiliensis plants from the Philippines to Haiti. In 1941, Bartlett successfully transported 4,800 rubber plants. The same year, Élie Lescot succeeded Vincent as president of Haiti.

== History ==
=== Establishment ===
The Lescot administration believed that large scale rubber production in Haiti would stimulate the economy. In 1941, the Export-Import Bank in Washington granted $5 million for the development of rubber plantations in Haiti. A company was established, named the Société Haïtiano-Américane de Développement Agricole. Thomas Fennell was brought on as president and general manager with Haitian Minister of Agriculture Maurice Dartigue serving as vice president. In addition to rubber production, the initial plan also involved increasing production of bananas and other food crops, oil producing crops, spices, medicinal plants, and plants useful for textiles. SHADA was granted a 50 year lease on 150,000 acres of land, along with a 50 year monopoly on the export of all natural rubber from Haiti. Although financed and supported by the US, the Haitian government retained 100% of SHADA stock.

=== Early years ===
In addition to rubber production, SHADA also exploited natural timber resources. 75,000 hectares of land were acquired by the company for the exploitation of timber. Species such as Haematoxylon campechianum were harvested by SHADA in areas such as the Forêt des Pins.

In 1942, SHADA switched focus from Hevea to Cryptostegia under contract of the US Rubber Reserve Company (later the US Rubber Development Corporation). An estimated 47,177 acres were cleared for the cultivation of the Cryptostegia vine in 1943. Farmers in Haiti's northern countryside were lured from food crop cultivation to meet increasing demand for rubber.

Lescot was a huge proponent for SHADA, believing the program was the solution to modernizing Haitian agriculture. However, the company began forcibly removing peasant families from Haiti's most arable tracts of land. Additionally, nearly a million fruit-bearing trees in Jérémie were cut down and peasant houses were invaded or razed. Dartigue was alarmed, and wrote to Fennell asking him to respect "the mentality and legitimate interests of the Haitian peasant and city-dwellers."

=== Decline ===
By 1944, it was clear that the program was failing. Yields did not meet expectations, and rubber exports were deemed insignificant. A severe drought from 1943-1944 further crippled the harvest. A US military report stated "The worst thing that can be said of SHADA is that they are doing [their operations] at considerable expense to the American taxpayer and in a manner that does not command the respect of the Haitian people". The US government offered $175,000 as compensation to the 35,000 to 40,000 displaced peasant families after recommending the program's cancellation.

In early 1944, The Rubber Development Corporation sent a delegation to cancel the Cryptostegia contract. Lescot feared SHADA's termination would add the burden of higher unemployment, as at its height over 90,000 people were employed by the company. His plea to continue operation until the end of the war was denied. A few months later, all Cryptostegia producing lands were razed and returned to the original owners, and Fennell resigned.

SHADA continued small scale production of sisal and Hevea under direction of J. W. McQueen. By 1953, the company was no longer in operation.
