= February 1935 Haitian referendum =

10 February 1935

Results
Choice	Votes	%
Yes	454,357	99.74%
No	1,172	0.26%

A referendum on a number of proposals made by President Sténio Vincent was held in Haiti on 10 February 1935. The changes were aimed at liberating the country from foreign financial control and improving the country's economy. They were reportedly approved by 99.7% of voters.

== Results ==
Choice	Votes	%
For	454,357	99.74
Against	1,172	0.26
Total	455,529	100.00
Source: Nohlen
