= Brouard =

Brouard is a surname. Notable people with the surname include:

- Carl Brouard (1902–1965), Haitian poet
- Matthieu Brouard (died 1576), Swiss Protestant minister
- Régis Brouard (born 1967), French footballer and manager
- Santiago Brouard (1919–1984), Basque politician
- Yohann Ndoye Brouard (born 2000), French swimmer
