= Haitian Aviation Corps =

- Corps d'Aviation des Forces Armées d'Haiti (French); Kò Aviyasyon Fòs Ame d'Ayiti (Haitian Creole)
- Founded: 1942–1995; 2017–present
- Country: Haiti
- Branch: Air force
- Role: Aerial warfare, Aerial Reconnaissance, Surveillance
- Part of: Armed Forces of Haiti
- Primary Garrison: Military Aviation Base; Clercine, Port-au-Prince, Haiti
- Mottos: (Haitian Creole: Veye Anwo, Veye Anba); Vigilate Supra, Vigilate Infra (Latin for 'Keep Watch Above and Below'')
- Mascots: Ridgway's hawk 'Ti malfini savann'
- Anniversaries: October 16
- Engagements: World War II; Battle of the Caribbean; Italian campaign (World War II) (embedded within U.S. Army Air Corps and Tuskegee Airmen)

Commanders
- Nominal Head: Alix Didier Fils-Aimé (acting)
- Minister of Defense: Mario Andrésol
- Commander-in-Chief of the Armed Forces: Lt.Gen. Derby Guerrier (Haitian Army) (acting)
- Commander of the Military Aviation Corps: Col. Brierre Mars
- Notable commanders: Lt.Col. Edouard Roy; Lt. Col. Gustave Silva; Col. Serge Bourdeau

Insignia
- Roundels (1942–1964)

- Roundel (1964–1986)

- Roundel (1986–1994)

The Aviation Corps of the Armed Forces of Haiti (French: Corps d'Aviation des Forces Armées d'Haiti) is the air force component of the Armed Forces of Haiti. The air corps was disbanded along with the rest of the armed forces after Operation Uphold Democracy, the U.S. invasion of 1994.

Since the remobilization of the Armed Forces in 2017, the ranks are slowly being filled, and it has reclaimed its main garrison at the Military Aviation base in Clercine (near Toussaint Louverture International Airport)

== History ==
The Aviation Corps (of the Guard of Haiti) was founded on October 16 1942, by Decree, by President Élie Lescot, with aircraft supplied by the US. The main task for this new air force was to patrol Haitian territory, transport and communication. Its first commander was Colonel Edward Roy. The Haitian Air Corps was headquartered at Bowen Field which was a former U.S. Marine Corps airfield. Môle-Saint-Nicolas Airport was a secondary airfield. During World War II, the Haitian Air Corps was engaged in the Caribbean anti submarine warfare campaign against the German Navy. In 1950 the Haitian Air Corps received its first combat aircraft: six F-51D Mustangs which were active during the Duvalier period. In October 1970 the Mustangs were replaced by T-28 Trojans from France. The T-28s were then replaced by O-2As in 1975. In the 1980s the Haitian Air Corps received its first jet aircraft: the SIAI-Machetti S-211 and these were accompanied by SF-260s to replace the O-2s which were sold for parts. In 1990 the SIAI-Machetti S-211s were sold, 2 were sold to United States private companies and the other two were sold to the Singapore Air Force. During Operation Uphold Democracy, the Haitian Air Corps played almost no role in Haitian defence, the Haitian inventory at the time included: Two O-57 Grasshopper scout planes, Three BT-13 Valiant trainer planes, One C-78 Bobcat transport plane, and one C-46 Commando transport plane. Almost all of the inventory at the time of the invasion dated back to World War II and was in very poor condition at the time, the air corps was disbanded along with the rest of the armed forces in 1994.

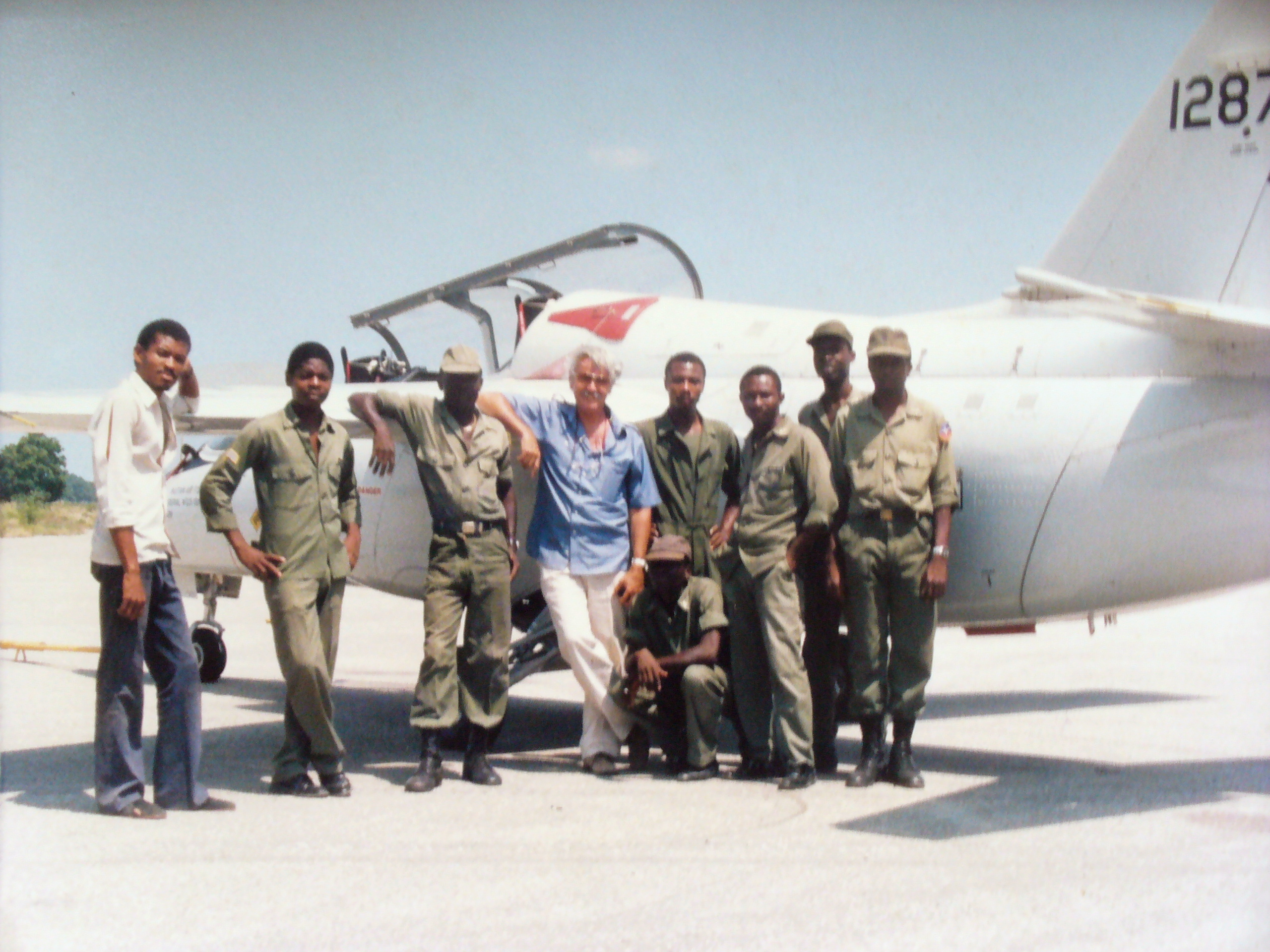
Lynn Garrison with Haitian Corps d'Aviation Marchetti and crew, September 1990

=== Past inventory ===
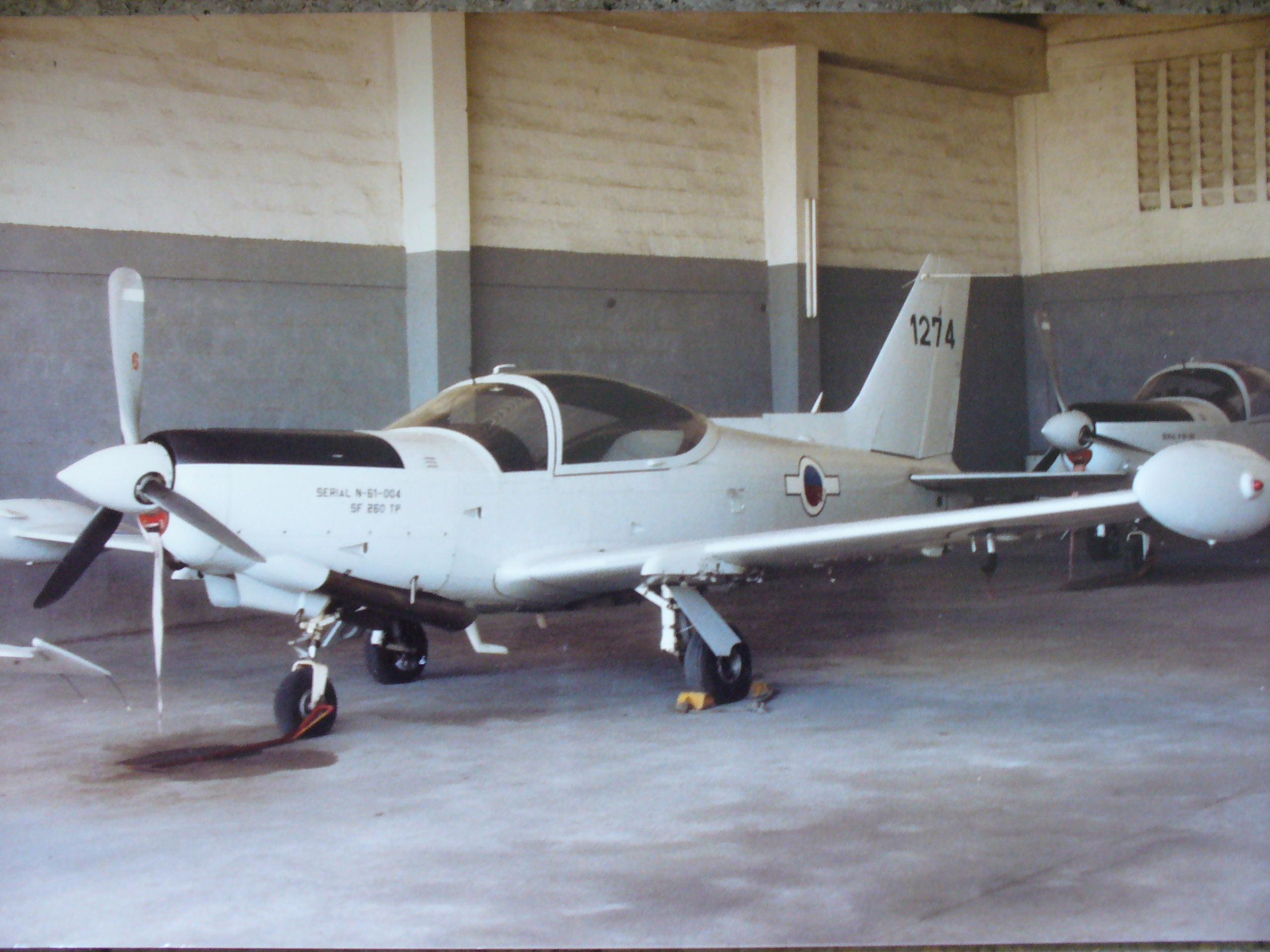
A Haitian Air Corps SF.260

At the time of disbandment of the Haitian Air Corps composed of:

Aircraft	Origin	Type	Variant	In service	Notes
Liaison
Taylorcraft O-57 Grasshopper	United States	Liaison		2	
Transport
Cessna C-78 Bobcat	United States	Light transport		1	
Curtiss C-46 Commando	United States	Heavy transport		1	
Trainer
Vultee BT-13 Valiant	United States	Trainer		3	In service since 1940s

Many of Haiti's air force aircraft were donated second hand from the United States and France:

- North American Aviation F-51D Mustang fighters – 6 delivered 1950 and the last retired 1973/74, sold to Dominican Republic for parts
- North American Aviation T-28 Trojan fighter trainer – 12 ex-French Air Force delivered 1973
- Cessna O-2A Skymaster – 8 observation aircraft delivered 1975 and sold to Dominican Republic for parts
- Sikorsky S-55 utility helicopters
- Curtiss-Wright C-46 Commando transport
- de Havilland Mosquito light bomber – 8 ex-Royal Air Force delivered 1946
- de Havilland Canada DHC-2 Beaver/de Havilland Canada DHC-6 Twin Otter utility transport
- Hughes Helicopters 269C utility/trainer helicopter – 3
- Hughes Helicopters 369CC utility/trainer helicopter – 2
- Sikorsky S-58T (CH-34 ChoctawC)
- Aermacchi SF.260TP Warrior trainer
- Cessna 150 – 3/
- Cessna 172 Skyhawk trainer – 1
- Lockheed C-60 Lodestar
- Boeing S-307 Stratoliner
- Cessna 310
- Douglas C-47 Dakota
- Beech 58 Baron
- Cessna 402 Utililiner
- IAI 201 Arava
- Piper PA-34 Seneca
- Cessna 303
- Beech 65 Queen Air
- Fairchild PT-19 trainer
- North American Aviation North American T-6G Texan trainer
- Vultee Aircraft Vultee BT-13A Valiant trainer
- Beech Bonanza F33 trainer
- SIAI-Machetti S-211 jet trainer, retired and put up for sale on 23 April 1990, 2 sold to United States Private companies and 2 to Republic of Singapore Air Force

== Modernization ==
In 2021, talks were held between Dr. Louis Marie Montfort Saintil, the Ambassador of Haiti in Spain, and Colonel Carlos Sanchez Bas of the Spanish Air and Space Force in the objectives of exploring avenues of cooperation, more precisely in the field of reorganization and modernization of the Aeronautical Corps of the Armed Forces of Haiti.

The Argentine Air Force has been providing technical assistance to the FAD'H via the Escuela de Aviación Militar, where 2 Haitian cadets are currently in attendance. On 16 March 2023, Ambassador Vilbert Bélizaire and Brigadier General Xavier Isaac signed a cooperation protocol between the Armed Forces of the Argentine Republic and the Armed Force of Haiti, formalizing a program of training and technical assistance from the Escuela de Aviacion to the FAD'H.

In an interview with Le Nouvelliste on December 23, 2024, Mexican Chargé d'Affaires to Haiti, Mr. Jésus Cisneros, stated that Mexico would be providing pilot training to a select group of Haitian servicemen.

After his second visit to Haiti, Colombian President announced that his country would be training 250 recruits for the aviation corps. The recruits are anticipated to travel to Colombia later this year to train with the Colombian Aerospace Force.

On Taiwan's National holiday event, Taiwanese ambassador to Haiti, Mr. Cheng-Hao Hu stated that Taiwan would be helping with the Haitian military's aerial transport capacities.

== Organization ==
The main garrison of the Aviation Corps is the Military Aviation Base (Base de l'Aviation Militaire) in Clercine, Port-au-Prince (next door to Toussaint Louverture International Airport). It previously housed a Chilean Air Force battalion of the MINUSTAH.

== Personnel ==
=== Officers ===
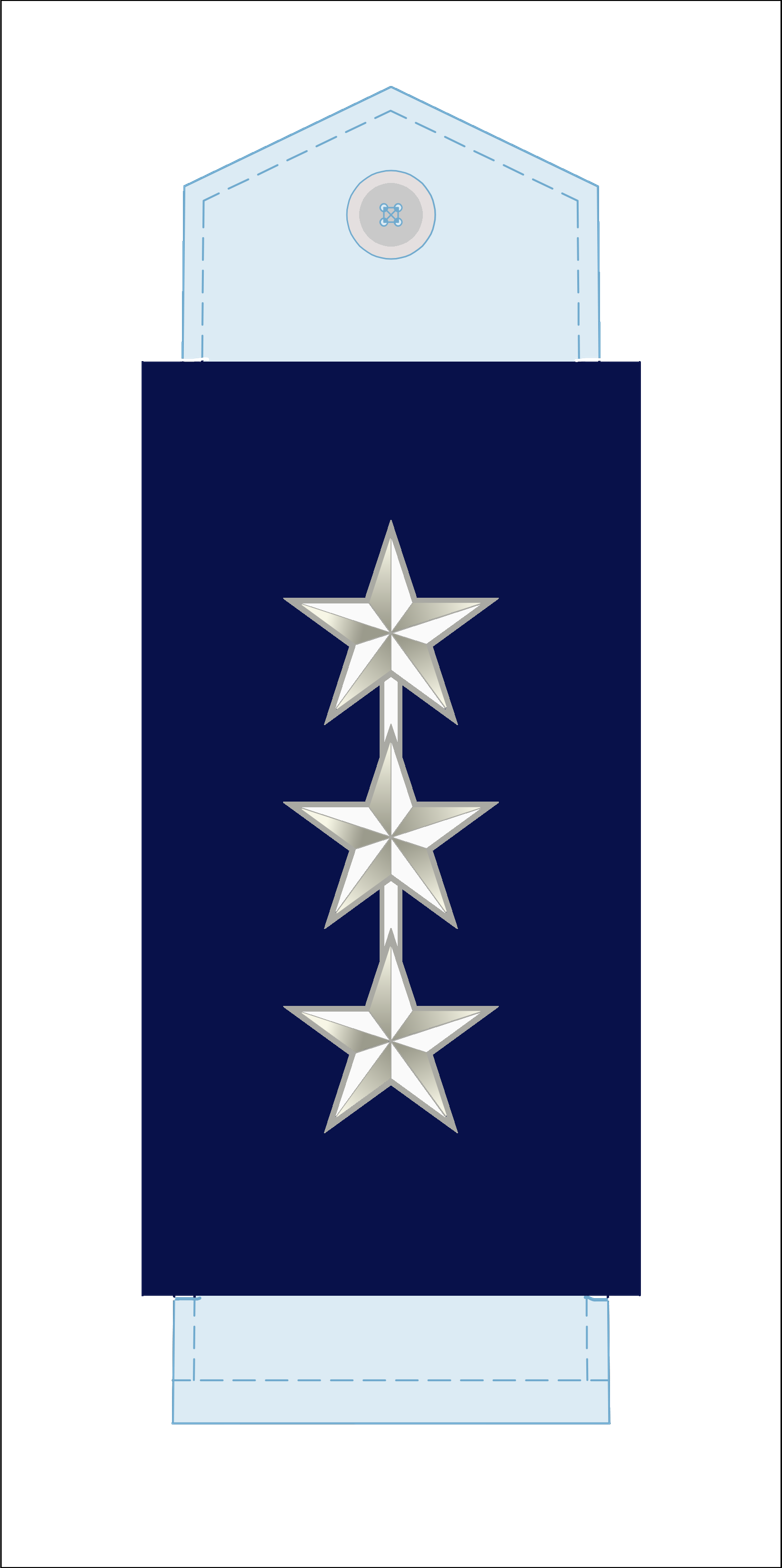
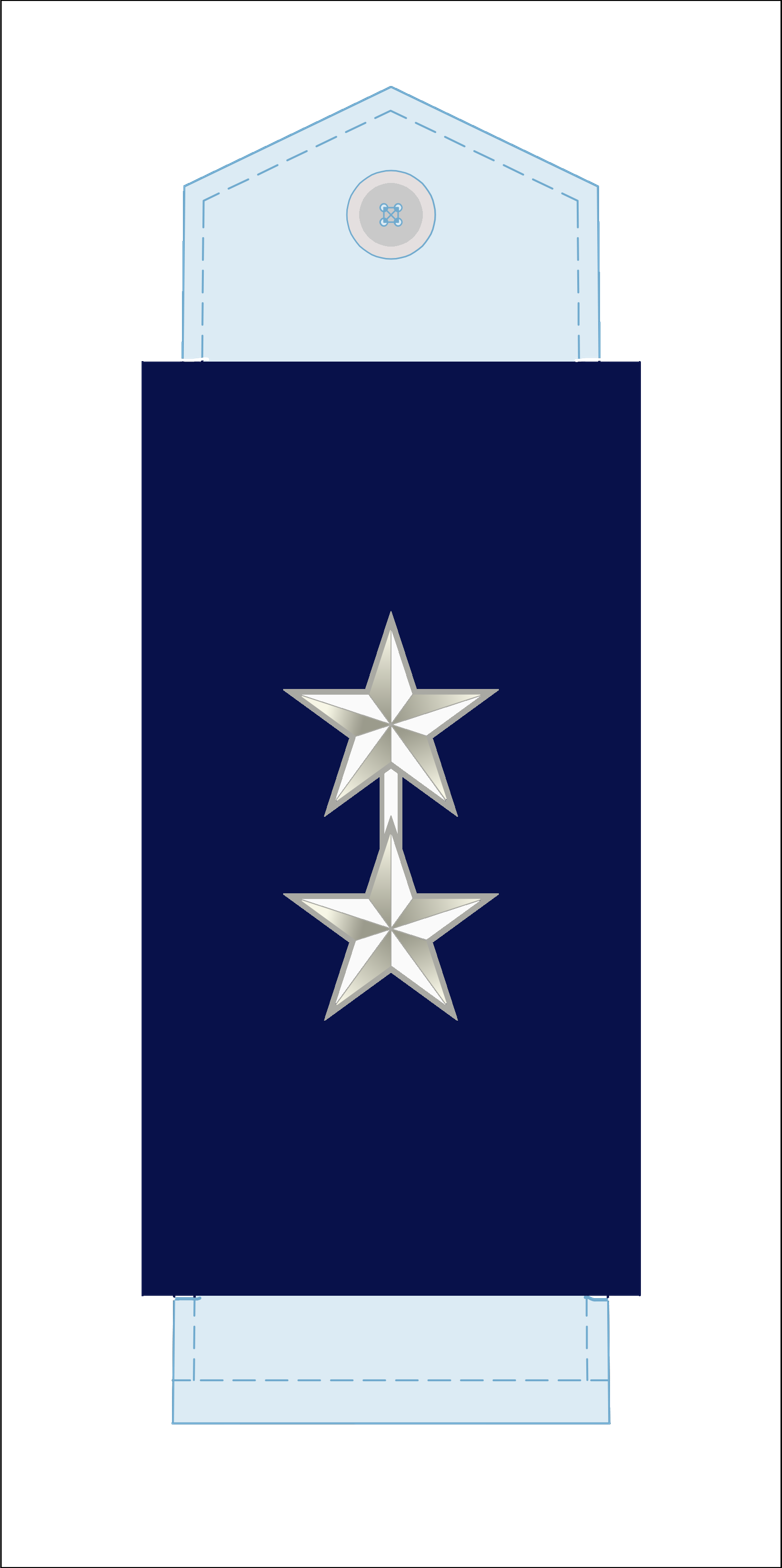
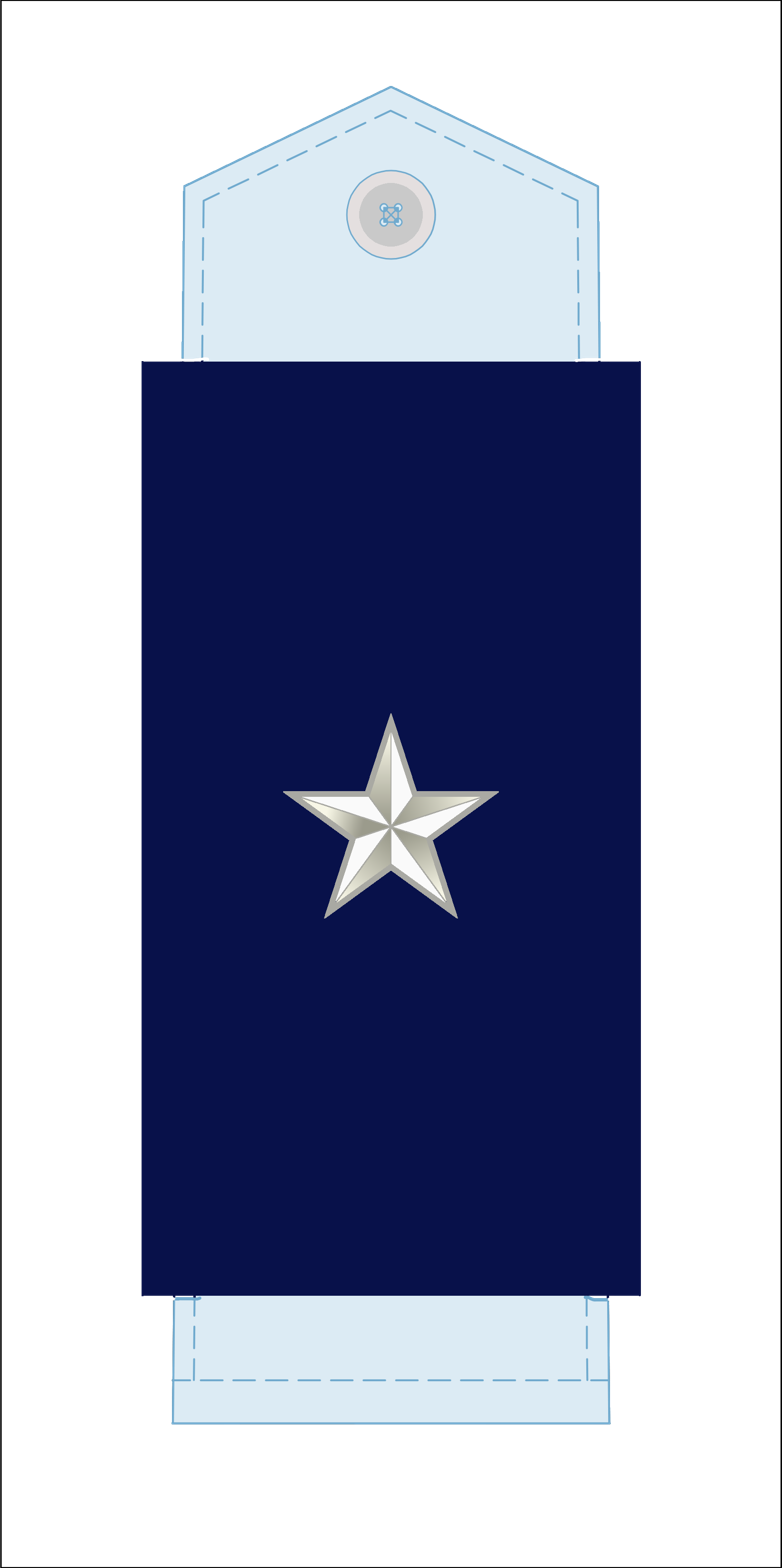
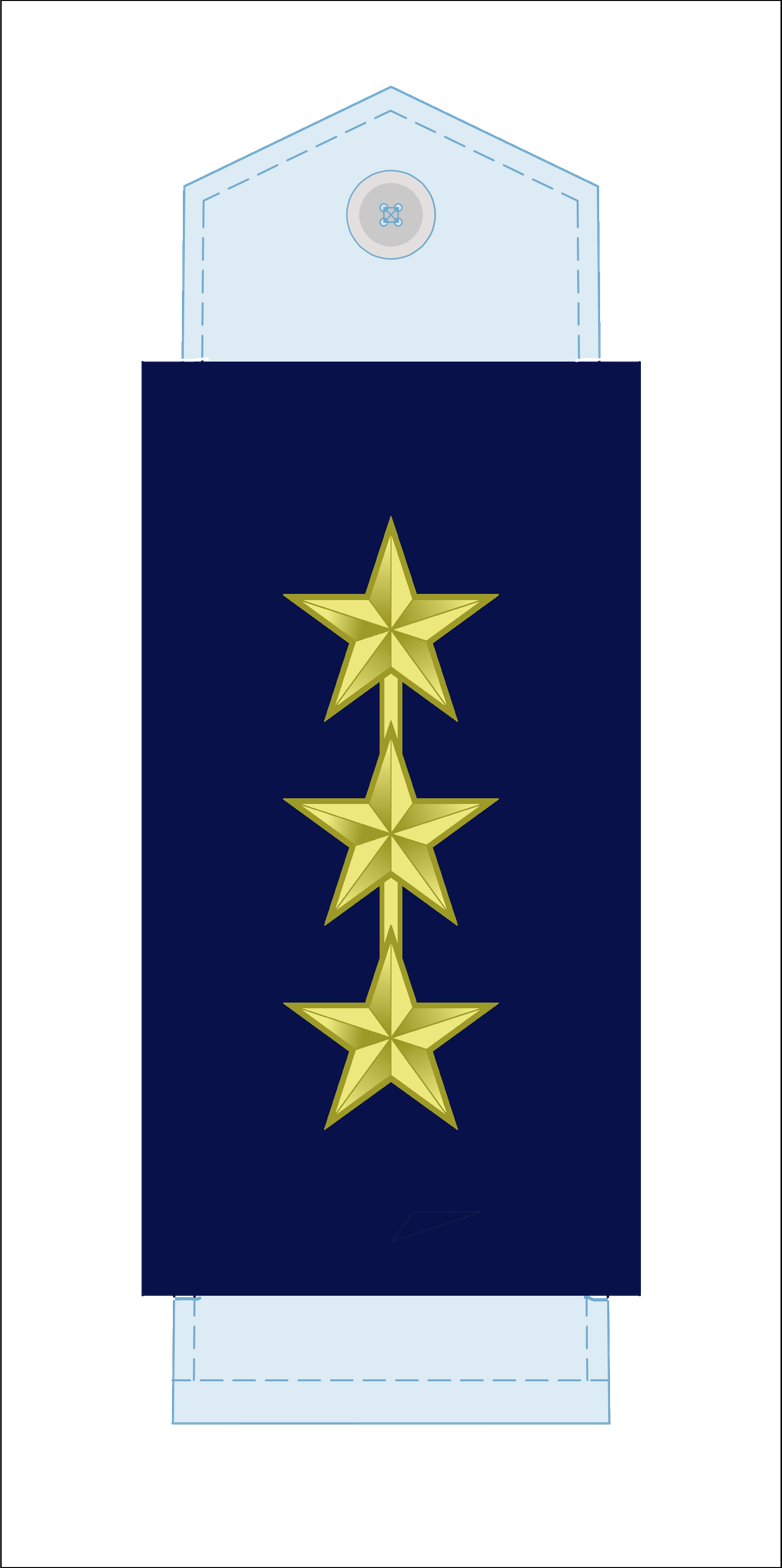
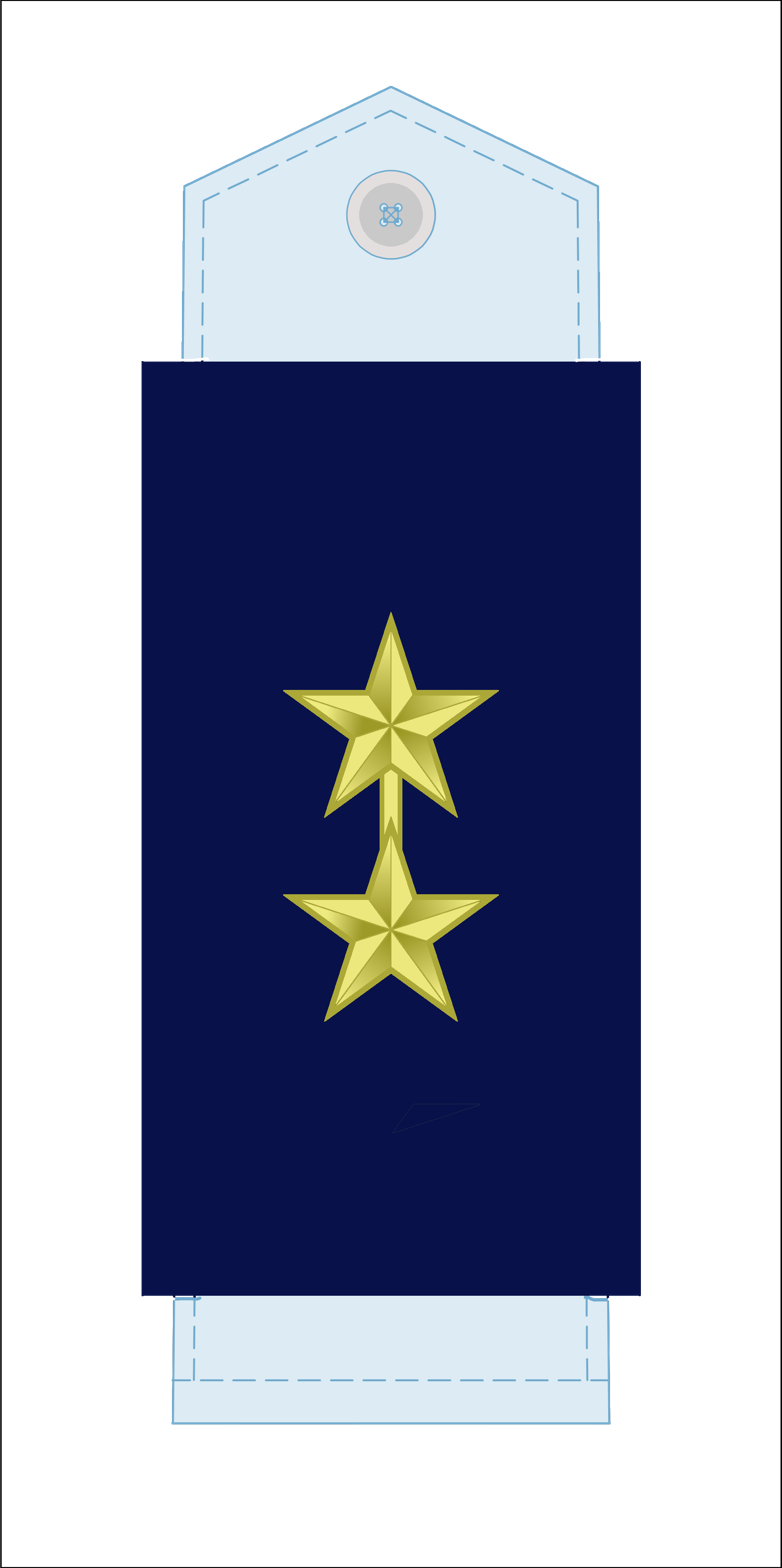
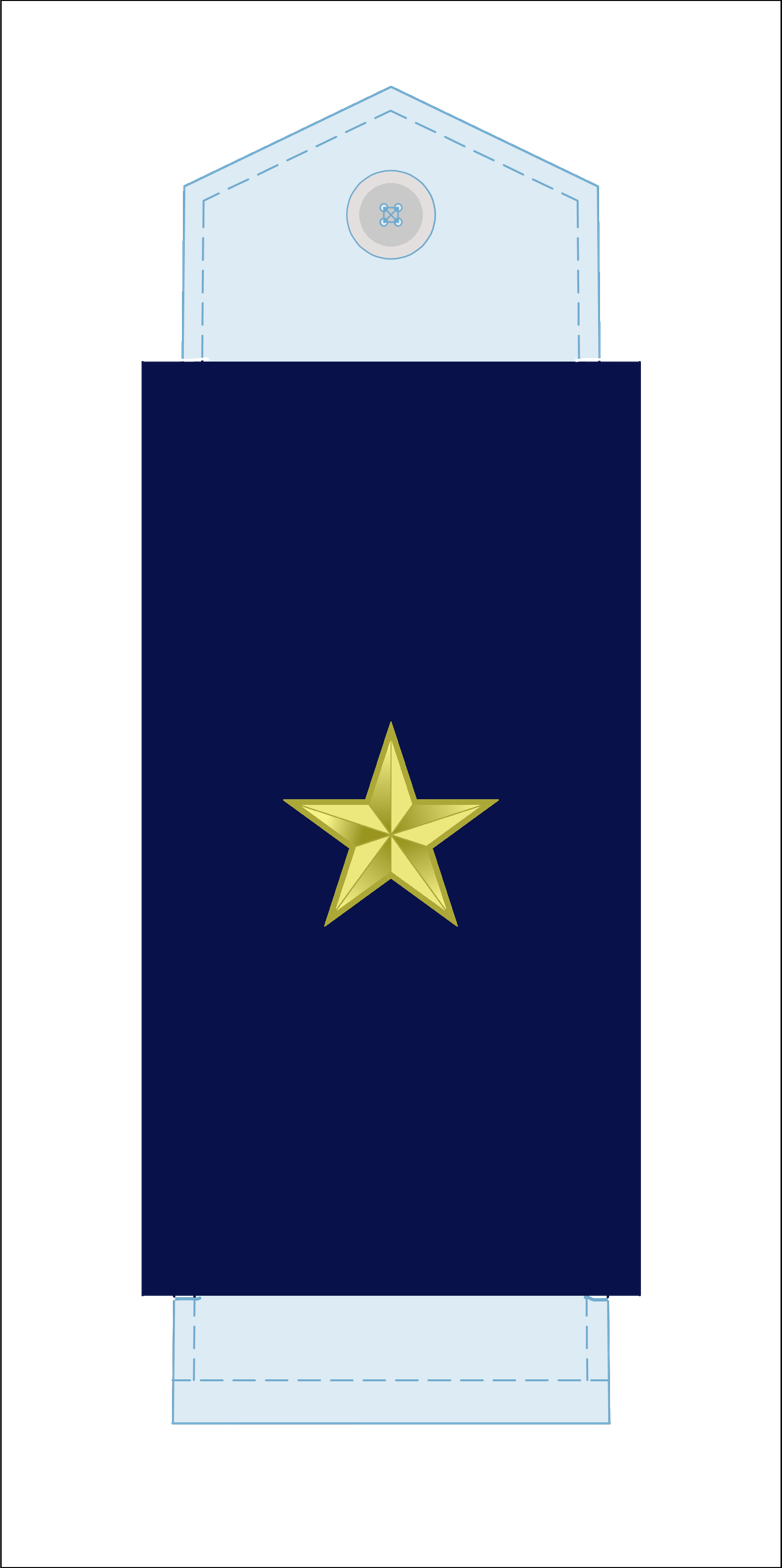
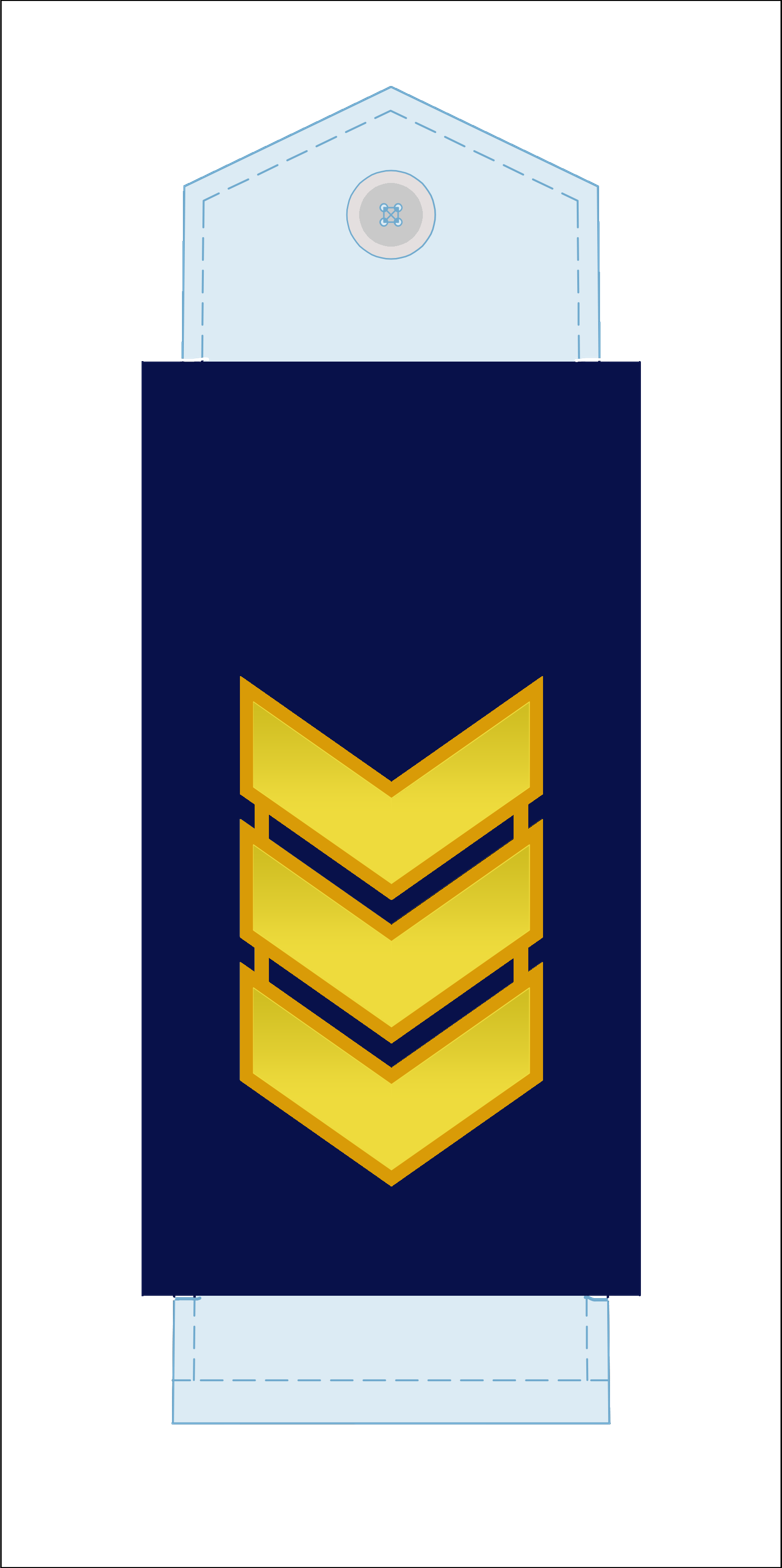
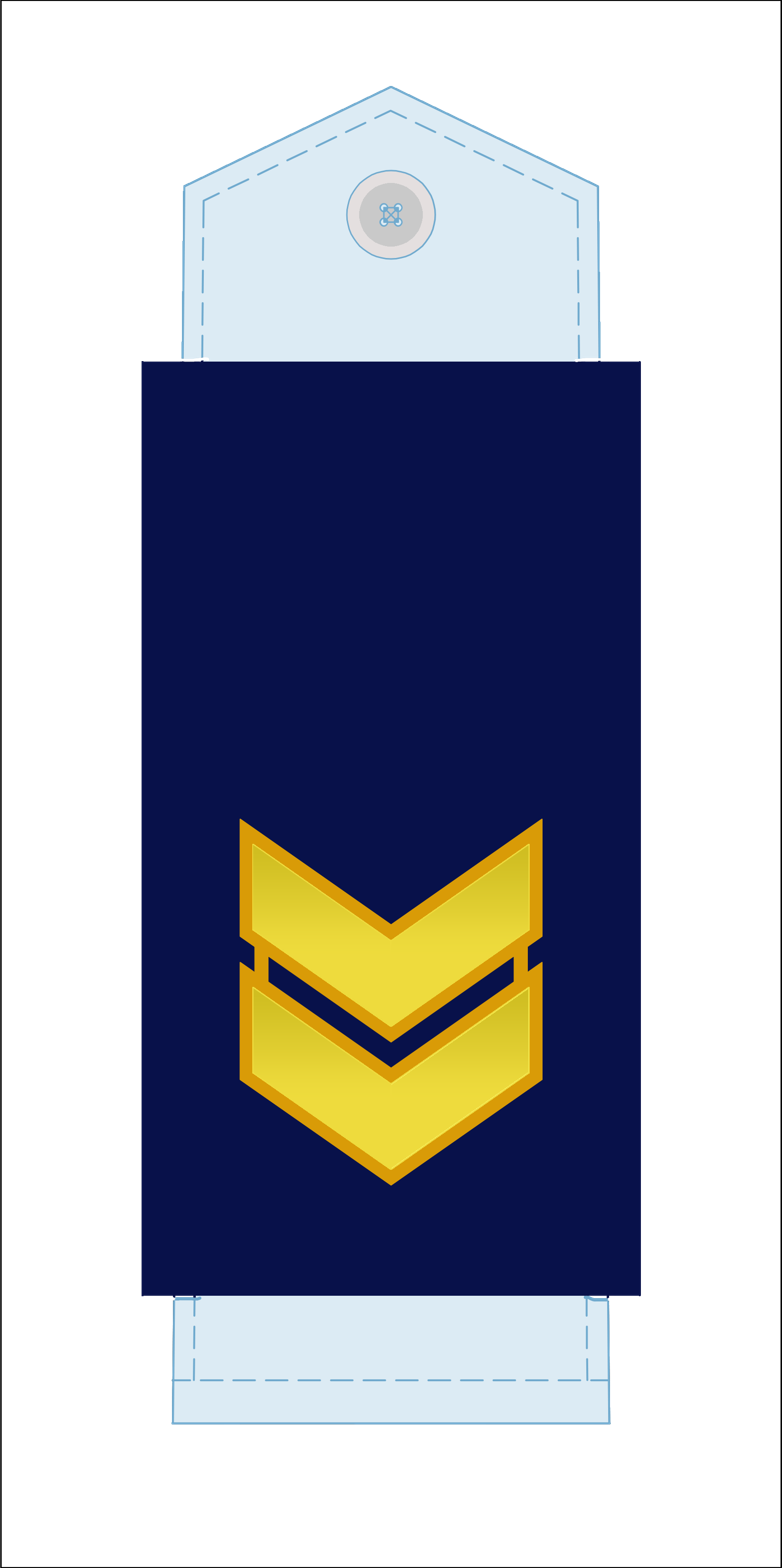
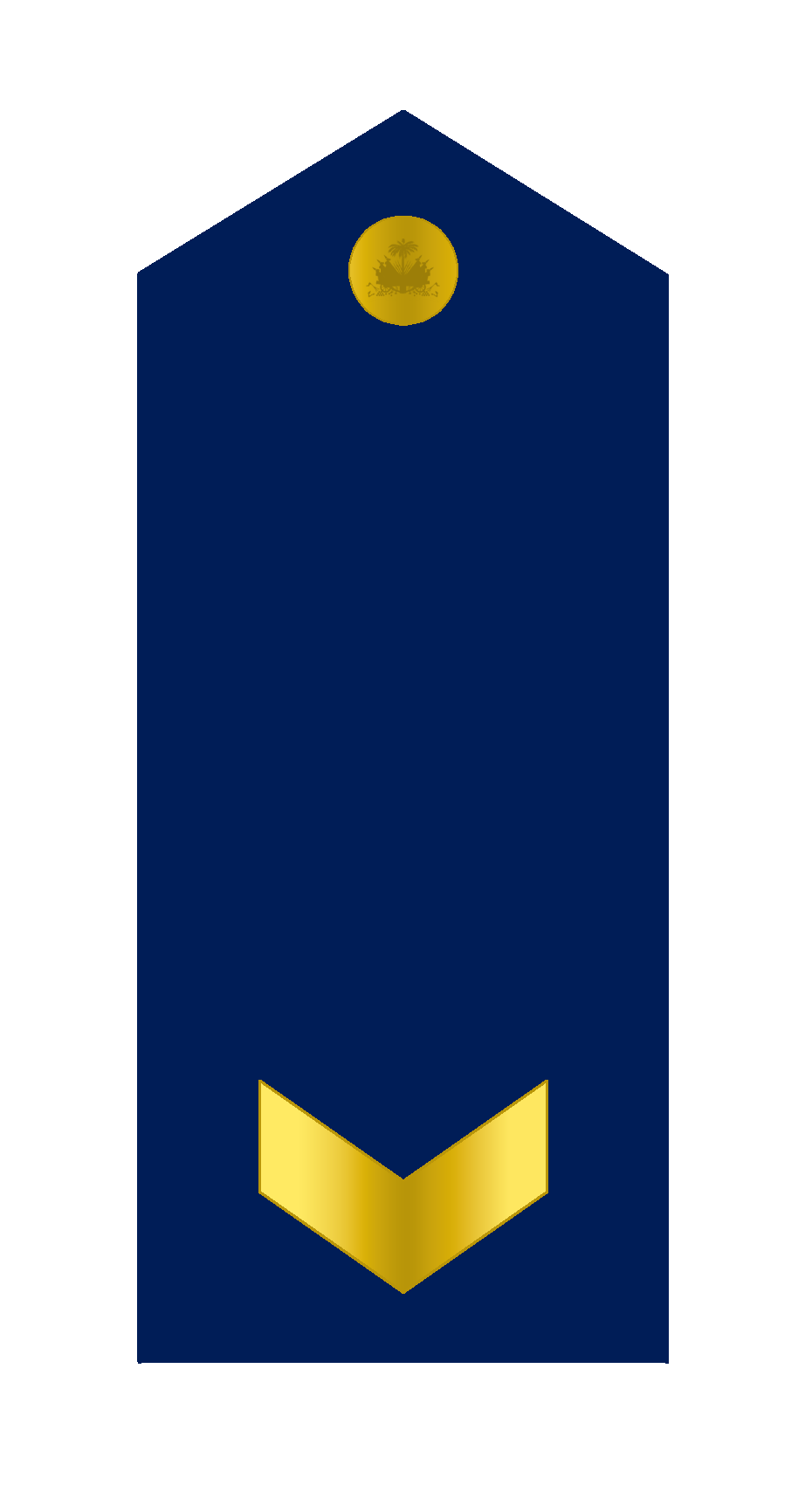
Rank group	General/Flag/Air officers			Senior officers			Junior officers
Haitian Aviation Corps
Haitian Aviation Corps	Lieutenant général	Major général	Général de brigade	Colonel	Lieutenant-colonel	Major	Capitaine	Lieutenant	Sous-lieutenant
Haitian Aviation Corps	Lyetnan jeneral	Majò jeneral	Jeneral brigad	Kolonèl	Lyetnan kolonèl	Majò	Kapitèn	Lyetnan	Soulyetnan

== Equipment ==
There are no aircraft currently in the inventory of the Aviation Corps. After a meeting between Presidents Leslie Voltaire (coordinator of the Transitional Presidential Council at the time) and Emmanuel Macron, a press release informed that France would evaluate the aerial needs of Haitian security forces.

On October 15, 2025, Defense minister Jean-Michel Moïse announced that aerial vehicles were on the way to reinforce the Aviation Corps.

== Notable Haitian Airmen ==
- Col. Edouard Roy (?–1963)
- Maj. Eberle Guilbaud (1920–1959)
- 2nd Lt. Raymond Cassagnol (1920–2023)
- Capt. Alix Pasquet (1919–1958)
- Lt. Ludovic Audant (1911-1974)
- Lt. Pelissier Nicolas
- Col. Serge Bourdeau
- Lt. Col. Gustave Silva

== See also ==
- Armed Forces of Haiti
- Haitian Army
- Haitian Navy
- Military history of Haiti
- Haitian National Police
