= Alix Pasquet =

Tuskegee Airman and coup plotter (1919–1958)

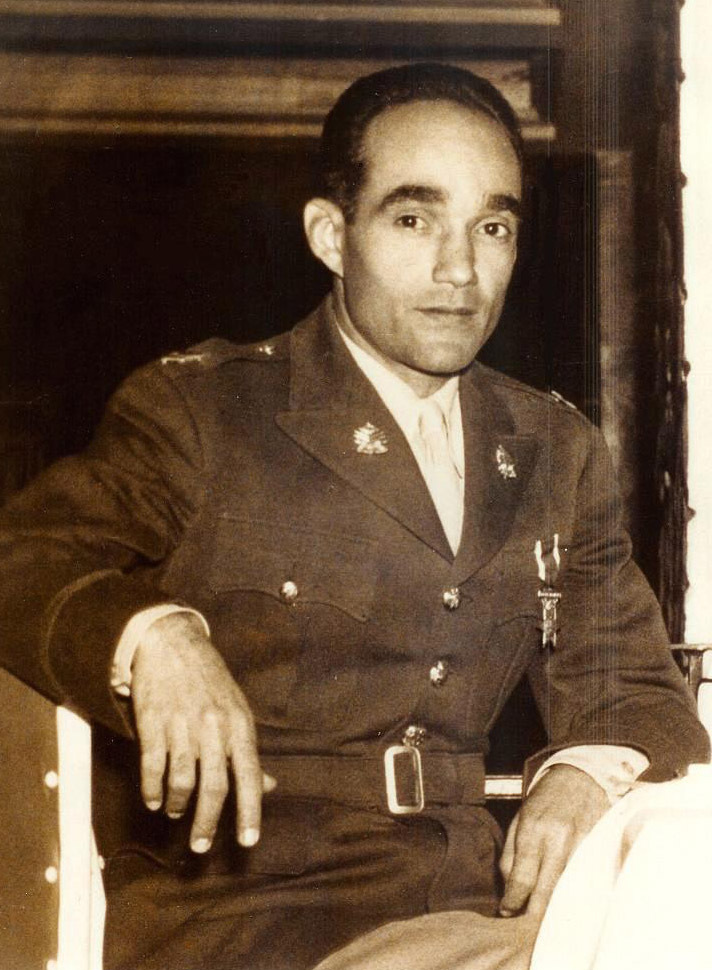
- Born: November 14, 1919; Haiti
- Died: July 29, 1958 (aged 38); Port-au-Prince, Haiti
- Military career
- Allegiance: Haiti; United States
- Branch: United States Army Air Forces; Haitian Air Force
- Rank: Captain
- Conflicts: World War II

Alix Pasquet (November 14, 1919 – July 29, 1958) was a World War II fighter pilot, one of only five Haitian members of the Tuskegee Airmen, a soccer star, and a political revolutionary. He was killed while leading a coup attempt against Haitian President François Duvalier in 1958.

== Fighter pilot ==
In 1942, Haitian President Élie Lescot implemented an aviation corps program and chose 3 men out of 42 corps members to receive pilot training in Tuskegee, Alabama. Alix Pasquet, a law graduate of École Millitaire d'Haiti and an officer in the Haitian army at the time, was one of these three chosen officers.

The U.S. government needed the Haitians to organize a patrol of the Caribbean Sea during World War II and gave the Haitian government six airplanes. These airplanes could carry bombs and could be used to attack German submarines within that area. In February 1943, Pasquet, along with Raymond Cassagnol and Philippe Célestin, traveled from Port-au-Prince to Alabama to begin training at the famed Tuskegee Flight School. The Tuskegee Airmen were renowned for their unmatched record of more than 200 combat missions with few losses. Pasquet's training went through three stages—primary, basic, and advanced—and was extremely rigorous. He was trained by Jimmy Plinton Jr., who was reputed as one of the best trainers in the Tuskegee Air Force program, over the course of a 7-month program.

The Afro-American Newspaper, one of the most widely circulated black newspapers at that time, ran a feature story on Pasquet, Cassagnol, and Célestin in April 1943, and the trio was noted for their aptitude with the English language. Additionally since Pasquet and his compatriots were from Haiti, they were unfamiliar with the pervasive racial segregation and racism in the American South at that time and were forced to ride on Blacks-only transportation or sit in the back of trains. As a result, they rarely ventured off-campus. Pasquet had a bad case of the flu and lost a month of his training, but ultimately graduated in August 1943 as a member of class 43G.

== Political revolutionary ==
After the end of his training, Pasquet returned to Haiti. However, he was exiled in 1957 for supporting Louis Déjoie in the May 1957 Haitian Civil War. From exile in Miami, Pasquet led a political movement to restore stability in his native country and overthrow current ruler François Duvalier. In 1958, he returned to Haiti with Henri Perpignan and Phillipe Dominique as well as five Americans—Arthur Payne, Dany Jones, Levant Kersten, Robert F. Hickey and Joe D. Walker—with the intention of overpowering the capital's army barracks and capturing the ammunition depot within. He gained entry through the barracks' gate by convincing the sentry that he was an officer delivering prisoners, and then quickly seized control of the barracks. However the plot was foiled when an accomplice, Henri Perpignan, sent a prisoner to acquire Haitian-blend cigarettes, who then revealed crucial details to the incumbent government about Pasquet's position.

Pasquet was killed during the attempted coup and buried in Port-au-Prince.

== Personal life ==
Pasquet married Denise Etheart and had three sons: Gilbert Pasquet, Alix Pasquet Jr., and Bernard Pasquet. In 1973 his son, Alix, married Michèle Bennett, who later married François Duvalier's son, Jean-Claude 'Baby Doc' Duvalier.
