= Raymond Cassagnol =

American fighter pilot (1920–2023)

- Born: September 20, 1920; Port au Prince, United States-occupied Haiti
- Died: June 24, 2023 (aged 102); Florida, U.S.
- Occupations: Military officer; fighter pilot

Raymond Cassagnol (September 20, 1920 – June 24, 2023) was a Haitian Air Force officer/flight instructor, alleged Haitian rebel leader, and one of the first Haitian Tuskegee Airmen, "Red Tails," or “Schwartze Vogelmenschen” ("Black Birdmen") or among enemy German pilots. Cassagnol was an aviation classmate and roommate of Daniel James Jr., the first-ever African American four-star general.

Cassagnol was Haiti's first World War II-trained combat fighter pilot in history. A centenarian, Cassagnol became the last surviving Haitian Tuskegee Airmen. He was also the author of the 2004 autobiographical "Mémoires d’un Révolutionaire", published in French.

An alleged Haitian rebel leader and fierce political opponent of former Haitian dictator François Duvalier, Cassagnol is noteworthy for flying a B-25 aircraft over Duvalier's National palace in May 1969 in an attempt to bomb it.

== Early life and family ==
Cassagnol was born on September 20, 1920, in U.S.-occupied Port au Prince, Haiti. The U.S. Marine Corps had occupied Haiti between 1915 and 1934.

In 1937, Cassagnol worked with his two older brothers who were employed as mechanics. A year later, he graduated from high school in Port-au-Prince, Haiti. Unable to afford college in Haiti, Cassagnol applied to the Haitian military.

On December 23, 1943, Cassagnol married his childhood sweetheart, Valentine Marie Therese Cassagnol (1921–2021) at the “Paroisse du Sacre Coeur” – Parish of the Sacred Heart. Valentine played a significant role in the founding of the Girl Scouts in Haiti (known there as the "Guides"). Cassagnol and Valentine were married for 77 years until her death in April 2021. The couple had several children: Mireille Cassagnol, Dominique Cassagnol Ballacchino, Jose Cassagnol, Claude Cassagnol and Raymond Cassagnol Jr. They also had 15 grandchildren and 10 great-grandchildren.

== Military service, Tuskegee Airmen ==
In 1942, the United States military bequeathed to Haiti six (6) armed Douglas O-38E observation planes costing $12,000 each to patrol the Caribbean Sea for Nazi German submarines regularly surfacing around Haiti. Soon after, Haiti built the Bowen Field airstrip in Port-au-Prince, Haiti. Though Haiti commissioned officers to fly these observation planes, all lacked formal flight training, leading to unnecessary aircraft accidents and wreckage.

In July 1942, Cassagnol responded to a Haitian government-sponsored newspaper ad seeking 40 airmen recruits. The ad resulted in pandemonium in Port-Au-Prince, Haiti on official selection day, attracting 800 frenzied airmen candidates and their families. The recruiters selected 42 candidates, including Cassagnol who almost missed his name being called, saved for a friend. He was also selected because he spoke four languages: French, Spanish, Creole and English. After returning home briefly to pack, Cassagnol left for Bowen Field for a three-week recruit boot camp as a new enlistee in the Haitian Army.

By 1943, Cassagnol became a sergeant and an aircraft mechanic within the maintenance department of the newly formed Haitian Air Force or Corps d’Aviation, created by then-Haitian President Elie Lescot in 1942. He regularly worked on Haiti's aircraft even after duty hours. Considered a high performer, Cassagnol began to attract the attention of pilot Dean Eshelman, provisional chief of Haiti's air squadron. One evening, Eshelman visited Bowen Airfield and noticed Cassagnol working overtime. When they asked him why he was working overtime, Cassagnol responded: "There is nothing else to do." Intrigued, Cassagnol was asked if he would be interested in becoming a pilot. The following week, the U.S. Embassy selected three Haitians for combat flight training at Tuskegee Army Airfield in Tuskegee, Alabama: Cassagnol, Philippe Celestin and Alix Pasquet. In February 1943, the Haitian government sent the men to the United States, traveling aboard a Douglas DC-3 aircraft from Port-au-Prince through Puerto Rico, Miami, Florida, and Jacksonville, Florida. They collectively became the first Haitians in history to train as combat fighter pilots.

After landing in Miami, Cassagnol received winter clothing, train tickets to Alabama and a substantial pay raise from $40/month for a Haitian sergeant to $80/month for an American sergeant.

Unaccustomed to Jim Crow segregation as a member of a privilege Haitian citizen, Cassagnol made every effort to avoid leaving Tuskegee Army Training Field and Tuskegee Institute's campus, for fear of exposing himself to the humiliation of racial segregation and white southern hostilities. Nonetheless, Cassagnol became fast friends and roommates with fellow aviation classmate Daniel James Jr., who would become the United States' first African American four-star General.

On July 28, 1943, Cassagnol graduated as a member of the Single Engine Section Cadet Class SE-43-G, earning his silver wings and subsequent promotion as a second lieutenant in the Haitian Air Force. A Tuskegee newspaper published an article describing Cassagnol and his two fellow Haitian pilots as a "Triple threat to the Axis." Cassagnol's accomplishment made the radio in Haiti.

After graduation, Cassagnol returned to Haiti to serve in the newly formed Haitian Air Force, becoming its primary flight instructor for Haiti's wartime pilot training program. Flying North American AT-6 Texans, Cassagnol logged over 100 hours of flight time patrolling the island of Hispaniola encompassing both Haiti and the Dominican Republic, defending against Nazi Germany's frequent, at-will submarine incursions in the area. Without the use of radar, Cassagnol and his team successfully nullified the Nazi German submarines, forcing the Germans to discontinue their incursion.

After a three-person military junta led by General Franck Lavaud (1903–1986), Paul Magloire and Antoine Levelt overthrew President Lescot in 1946, Cassagnol resigned from the Haitian military in April 1946. However, General Franck Lavaud denied Cassagnol's resignation on grounds that the Haitian public and Haiti's enemies could perceive Cassagnol's resignation as evidence of a significant rift in the Haitian armed forces. Nonetheless, in July 1946, Cassagnol submmited his resignation again. The military junta accepted it towards an August 9, 1946 effective date.

== Post-military career, fierce opposition to Haitian dictator François Duvalier ==
In 1947, now an entrepreneur in Haiti, Cassagnol obtained a private commercial pilot's license and initially worked as a pilot for the Dauphin Plantation, landing his plane at the Phaeton Airport. In the 1950s, Cassagnol founded a sawmill and lumber construction company in Haiti's Plateau Central. As owner, Cassagnol purchased a BT-13 aircraft. After receiving military clearances from the Cerca-La-Source center, he built an airstrip to quickly travel between worksites and his home in Port-au-Prince, typically a half-hour flight versus a 2-3 day trip by car.

Nonetheless, several high-ranking Army officers at Haiti's Port-au-Prince objected to Cassagnol's flight clearances on grounds that they should be the only ones with the authority to grant clearances. Subsequently, Cassagnol sold his now grounded aircraft to the Aviation Corps of Haiti for transport mail an personnel. Cassagnol abandoned his airfield.

During Haiti President Paul Magloire's administration (1950 - 1956), Cassagnol objected to Magloire and his political favoritism. When Haiti held its presidential election in 1957, a non-partisan Cassagnol objected to president candidate Clement Jumelle, viewing him as a continuation of Paul Magloire’s corrupt politics. Though Cassagnol initially doubted François Duvalier's candidacy, Cassagnol quickly objected to Duvalier after Duvalier won the Haitian presidency and began to systematically target and kill his political enemies. Soon after, Cassagnol became a fierce opponent of Duvalier.

In 1961, Cassagnol met with General Rafael Leónidas Trujillo to devise plans to overthrow Duvalier. Unfortunately, Cassagnol discovered that General Truillo had previously informed Duvalier three years earlier in December 1958 that Truillo had given armaments to Cassagnol and former Haitian senator Louis Dejoie, a fierce opponent of Duvalier. Fearing for his life, Cassagnol and his family fled Haiti on October 8, 1962, entering the Dominican Republic as political asylees. After his arrival in the Dominican Republic, he continued to engage in anti-Duvalier efforts.

In May 1969, Cassagnol flew a B-25 over Duvalier's National palace to bomb it.

Cassagnol and his family later emigrated to the United States. In 1986 after François Duvalier's son Jean-Claude Duvalier was deposed from power, Cassagnol returned to Haiti after 17 years away from his native land. Nonetheless, Cassagnol has not been recognized or welcomed by any of the Haitian government administrations since his 1986 visit. In 1999, Cassagnol deeded 200 acres of land he owned in Haiti to a charitable organization.

In November 2000, at the age of 81, Cassagnol visited Tuskegee, Alabama and Tuskegee University after a 57-year absence.

In 2002, it was noted that, after living in Orlando, Florida for 20 years, Cassagnol had moved to Mobile, Alabama.

Cassagnol died in Florida on June 24, 2023, at the age of 102.

== Honors ==
- In April 2010, Cassagnol received a replica Congressional Gold Medal from Florida U.S. Representative Suzanne Kosmas at a special ceremony in his honor. He previously missed the 2007 Tuskegee Airmen Congressional Gold Medal ceremony in Washington, DC.
- In 2009, President of the United States Barack Obama invited Cassagnol as a special guest of the January 20, 2009 U.S. Presidential Inauguration.
- On October 27, 2020, the Seminole County board of commissioners in Florida honored Cassagnol with a proclamation highlighting his service during World War II.
- On May 20, 2021, the New York General Assembly honored the contribution of Cassagnol and other Haitians for New York's Haitian Unity Day, in conjunction with its observance of Haitian Heritage Month.

== See also ==
- Tuskegee Airmen
- List of Tuskegee Airmen Cadet Pilot Graduation Classes
- List of Tuskegee Airmen
- Military history of African Americans
- Dogfights (TV series)
- Executive Order 9981
- The Tuskegee Airmen (movie)
