= Jean Joseph Maurice Dartigue =

Haitian public official and educational reformer

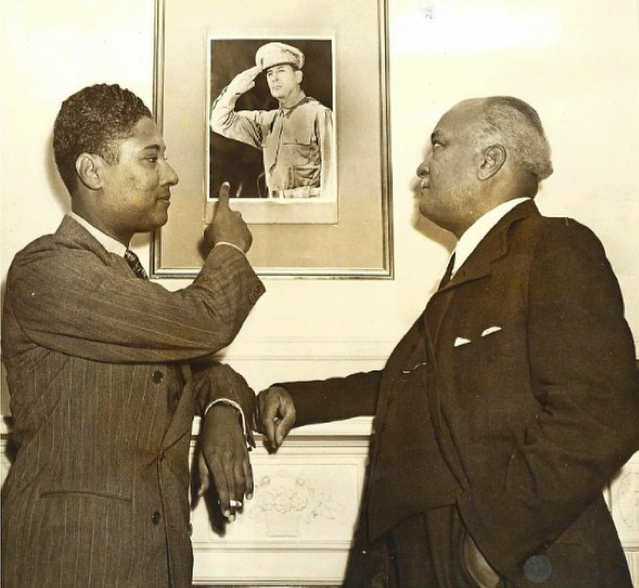
Dartigue (left) and Élie Lescot (right), c. 1942

Jean Joseph Maurice Dartigue (1903–1983) was a Haitian public official and educational reformer. He believed the cause of problems in Haiti was the nation's poor educational system. He continued his work with UNESCO in Africa until the end of his career.

== Early life ==
Maurice Dartigue was born in Les Cayes, Haiti in 1903. His father was Jean Baptiste Dartigue, a lawyer, député, and Governor of the South. Maurice had two sisters and a brother.

Dartigue attended the Petit Séminaire Collège Saint-Martial. In 1924, he attended Haiti's Faculty of Law. However, he dropped out of law school after his first year. He then enrolled in the École Centrale d'Agriculture (Central School of Agriculture) and graduated in 1926. From 1927 through 1928, he traveled to the United States to begin working towards a master's degree at Teachers College, Columbia University. It was here that he met his future wife, Esther Reithoffer.

== Career ==
In 1926 Dartigue was hired as an assistant to the Director of Rural Education. In 1928, he began working as a teacher in education and social studies. That year he became the director of an agricultural boarding school. He was brought back to the School of Agriculture to supervise their experimental farm plots in 1930. He returned to Columbia University in 1930, and he completed his master's degree in rural education in 1931.

In 1934, the final year of the United States occupation of Haiti, Dartigue was named Director of Rural Education. He remained in the position from 1934 until 1941. In 1941, he became Minister of Public Instruction, Labor, and Agriculture, a role he retained until 1945. In this role, Dartigue served as vice president for the corporate entity Société haitiano-américaine de développement agricole. This was a joint venture between the United States of America and Haiti during World War II to expand wartime production of rubber in the Haitian countryside.

As a minister, Dartigue was partially successful in implementing reforms for primary and vocational schools, but failed to restructure secondary schools before the Haitian Revolution of 1946.

Dartigue sought asylum in the United States after Élie Lescot was overthrown. He moved to New York to work with the United Nations as a specialist in education. In 1956, he moved to Paris for a position with UNESCO. Here, he supervised the Major Latin American Project (LAMP). He joined the UNESCO mission to the Congo from 1960 to 1961. In 1962, he was appointed by UNESCO to be Chief of the African Division. He was heavily involved in overseeing educational reform in Africa until his retirement in 1971.

Dartigue died in Paris in 1983.

== Legacy ==
The Jean Joseph Maurice Dartigue Papers, consisting of records pertaining to the Société haitiano-américaine de développement agricole, are indexed by the Library of Congress.

His son, John Dartigue, was an executive and vice president of publicity at Warner Brothers. He died in 2022.
