= Jacques Roumain =

Haitian writer and politician (1907–1944)

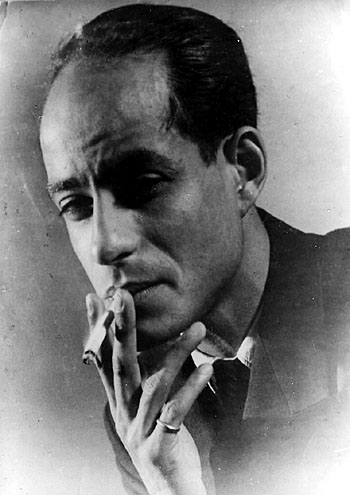
- Roumain in 1942
- Born: June 4, 1907; Port-au-Prince, Haiti
- Died: August 18, 1944 (aged 37); Port-au-Prince, Haiti
- Occupations: Writer, politician, poet
- Notable work: Gouverneurs de la Rosée (Masters of the Dew)
- Political party: Haitian Communist Party

Jacques Roumain (French pronunciation: [ʒak ʁumɛ̃]; June 4, 1907 – August 18, 1944) was a Haitian writer and politician, considered one of the most prominent figures in Haitian literature. Ideologically a Marxist and communist, Roumain helped establish a number of leftist organizations, foremost the Haitian Communist Party, which he led until his exile in 1936.

Langston Hughes translated some of Roumain's works, including Gouverneurs de la Rosée (Masters of the Dew), which was also adapted to film.

== Life ==
Roumain was born on June 4, 1907, in Port-au-Prince to wealthy mulatto parents. His grandfather, Tancrède Auguste, served as the President of Haiti from 1912 to 1913. He was educated in Catholic schools in Port-au-Prince, and later in Belgium, Switzerland, France, Germany, and Spain. At twenty years old, he returned to Haiti and formed La Revue Indigene: Les Arts et La Vie (The Indigenous Review: Arts and Life), along with Philippe Thoby-Marcelin, Carl Brouard, and Antonio Vieux.

He was active in the struggle against the United States' occupation of Haiti. Roumain founded the Anti-Imperialist League with fellow communist Georges Petit in 1934. A few months later in the summer of 1934, Roumain and other young communists founded the Haitian Communist Party (abbreviated as PCH, from French) in Port-au-Prince. Roumain became the party's leader and co-authored the party's program, The Schematic Analysis, 1932–1934, (Note: Original French title: L'Analyse schématique 32–34) with Étienne Charlier, a core party member who had been educated in Paris. The program offered the first Marxist critique of Haitian society.

The establishment of the PCH alarmed the Haitian authorities, who began a crackdown on leftists in August 1934. Roumain was arrested and charged with treason; his case rested largely on a letter in which he requested "matériel" from a Haitian communist living in New York City. The authorities interpreted "matériel" to mean explosives, but Roumain had in fact been asking for purchased literature related to the convictions of the Scottsboro Boys of Alabama, whose release he had been supporting. Roumain protested his detention, stating that brochures were not explosives and communists were not terrorists. International leftist and black organizations also pressed for his release. The court nonetheless convicted him and sentenced him to three years in prison. In 1936, President Sténio Vincent pardoned Roumain and other leftists because he no longer felt threatened by the left; in the previous year, he extended his presidential powers and tenure through a successful popular referendum. Roumain subsequently left Haiti on 15 August, making his way to Europe for what would become a five-year-long self-exile.

During his years in exile, Roumain worked with and befriended many prominent pan-African writers and poets of the time, including Langston Hughes. During this time he was also affiliated with Columbia University in New York City, where he conducted ethnographical research. With a change in government in Haiti, Roumain was allowed to return to his native country. Upon returning, he founded the Office of Ethnology. In 1943, President Élie Lescot appointed him chargé d'affaires in Mexico, where his newly found creative freedom permitted him to complete two of his most influential books, the poetry collection Bois D'ébène (Ebony Wood) and the novel, Gouverneurs de la Rosée (Masters of the Dew). He also published that year the seminal paper "Lithic Workshop of the Ciboney of Haiti", and as a result is regarded as the father of Haitian archaeology.

Much of Roumain's work expresses the frustration and rage of people who have been downtrodden for centuries. He included the mass of the people in his writing and called on the poor to unite to move against privation.

== Death and legacy ==
On August 18, 1944, Roumain died of unknown causes at age 37. Roumain created some of the most colorful, dynamic, and moving poetry of his generation. His writings continue to influence and shape Haitian culture and the pan-African world of today.

By the time of his death, Roumain had become an acclaimed writer in the Caribbean, Latin America, and Europe. His novel, Gouverneurs de la Rosée, has achieved a place among Caribbean and Latin American literature. It is a novel that is still studied at universities, read by new generations, and acted out by theatrical groups.

== Selected works ==
From the collection of the Library of Congress, Washington, DC:

- Oeuvres Complètes, Léon-François Hoffman, Ed. ALLCA XX (Coll. Archivos), Paris, 2003.
- A propos de la campagne "anti-superstitieuse". Port-au-Prince, Impr. de l'État [1944?]
- Analyse schématique 1932–1934. [Haiti]: Editions idées nouvelles, idées prolétariennes, 1999.
- Bois-d’ébène. Port-au-Prince, Haiti: Imp. H. Deschamps [c1945]
- Ebony wood. Bois-d’ébène. Poems. The French text with a translation by Sidney Shapiro. New York: Interworld Press [1972] ISBN 0-912956-00-3
- Les fantoches [Port-au-Prince?] 1931.
- Gouverneurs de la rosée, roman. [Port-au-Prince: Imprimerie de l'état, 1944]
- Sar ha-telalim. Translated into Hebrew. [Merhavya, 1948]
- Governadores del rocío. Translated into Spanish. Habana: Impr. Nacional de Cuba [1961]
- Zotër të vesës (roman). Translated into Albanian. [Tiranë]: Shtépia Botonjése Naim Frashéri [1968]
- Gouverneurs de la rosée: roman. Fort-de-France [Martinique]: Désormeaux, [1979], c1977 (1983 printing)
- Gouverneurs de la rosée: roman. Unité de Réghaïa, Algérie: ENAG, c1989.
- Gouverneurs de la rosée. Coconut Creek, Fla.: Educa Vision Inc., [1999]. ISBN 1-58432-054-0
- Masters of the Dew. Gouverneurs de la rosée, translated by Langston Hughes and Mercer Cook. New York: Reynal & Hitchcock, c1947.
- Masters of the Dew. Gouverneurs de la rosée, translated by Langston Hughes and Mercer Cook. Oxford; Portsmouth, NH: Heinemann, [1997?], c1978. ISBN 0-435-98745-3
- La montagne ensorcelée. [Port-au-Prince: S.N.E.P.] 1931.
- La montagne ensorcelée. Paris: Messidor, c1987. ISBN 2-209-05922-4
- La montagne ensorcelée. Paris: Éditeurs français réunis [1972]
- La montagne ensorcelée: roman 4th ed. Montréal, QC: Mémoire d'encrier, 2005. ISBN 2-923153-33-2
- Poèmes Port-au-Prince, Haïti: Editions des Antilles, [1993]
- Poemas de una isla y de dos pueblos. With Pedro Mir, Jacques Viau. La Habana, Cuba: Casa de las Américas, 1974.
- Poésies; Griefs de l'homme noir; La proie et l'ombre; La montagne ensorcelée (récit paysan) Port-au-Prince, Haïti: Editions fardin, 1998.
- La proie et l'ombre Port-au-Prince, Haïti: Éditions "La Presse" [1930]
