= July 1958 Haitian coup attempt =

Attempted overthrow of François Duvalier

July 1958 Haitian coup d'état attempt
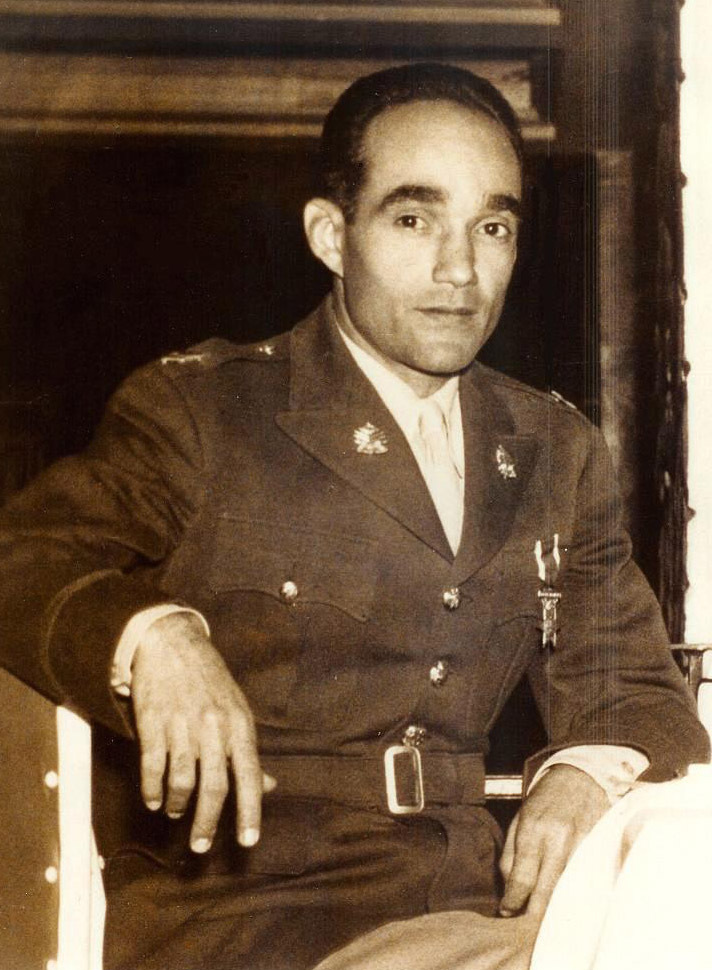
- Coup leader Alix Pasquet, date unknown.
Date	28–29 July 1958
Location	Port-au-Prince, Haiti
Status	Coup attempt failed, Pasquet killed in combat

Belligerents
(Haiti) Haitian government	(Haiti) Haitian Armed Forces

Commanders and leaders
(Haiti) François Duvalier	(Haiti) Alix Pasquet †

On 28–29 July 1958, Alix "Sonson" Pasquet, accompanied by two fellow Haitian military officers and five American mercenaries, attempted to overthrow Haitian President François Duvalier by seizing an army barracks in Port-au-Prince and rallying like-minded troops for an attack on the Presidential palace. Hoped-for support failed to materialize and all eight of the insurgents were killed by troops loyal to Duvalier.

Contemporary newspaper articles sometimes referred to the coup attempt as 'Pasquet's Invasion' or 'the Sheriffs Invasion' (as some of the Americans involved were former sheriff's deputies).

== Background ==
François 'Papa Doc' Duvalier was elected President of Haiti in September 1957. A doctor and former Minister of Health, he was initially seen by many Haitians as a populist reformer; however, he soon began to display behavior typical of an autocrat. Rival political parties were banned, and independent newspapers were shut down. Mixed-race mulattoes, who formed much of Haiti's upper class – and who were a source of much of the opposition to Duvalier – were frequently harassed, arrested, or forced into exile.

Among those exiled were three former officers in the Haitian Army: Captain Alix "Sonson" Pasquet, Lt. Phillipe "Fito" Dominique, and Lt. Henri "Riquet" Perpignan.

Pasquet was an aviator who had trained and served in combat with the Tuskegee Airmen during the Second World War. He was from a prominent mulatto family, and had also been a star player on Haiti's national football team. Dominique and Perpignan were also mulatto army officers. Dominique was Pasquet's brother-in-law.

From exile in Miami, Florida, Pasquet led a political movement to overthrow Duvalier and restore Haiti's traditional social order. At the same time, he, Dominique, and Perpignan began plotting a direct strike against the Duvalier government. Although the U.S. government was tepidly supportive of the anti-communist Duvalier, the exiles befriended five Americans who were willing to accompany them on a mission to Haiti. The Americans – Arthur Payne, Dany Jones, Levant Kersten, Robert F. Hickey, and Joe D. Walker – were intrigued by the promise of adventure and a possibly very lucrative outcome. A yacht captained by Walker, the Molly C, would take them to Haiti.

Pasquet's plan was to land near the Haitian capital of Port-au-Prince, seize the Casernes Dessalines (an army barracks near the National Palace), and from there summon old friends in military units he had served with. He knew the area well and felt confident that many officers and troops would quickly rally to the anti-Duvalier cause. Using the large cache of weapons and ammunition stored in the Casernes Dessalines, they would then seize the Palace and other key facilities.

The eight well-armed invaders left Miami aboard the Molly C on or about 25 July 1958.

== The coup attempt ==
On the afternoon of 28 July 1958 the insurgents' yacht arrived off Montrouis, in an area known as Déluge, about forty-five miles north of Port-au-Prince. The three Haitians, in military uniform, and the five Americans, dressed as tourists, began transferring weapons and supplies from the Molly C to a small beach cabin. They were observed by local peasants, who alerted the headquarters of the St. Marc's military district. That evening, a Haitian officer and three soldiers who arrived in a jeep to investigate were fired on by the rebels; one soldier was killed on the spot, and the other three wounded, all later dying. One of the Americans, Arthur Payne, a former Miami-Dade County sheriff's deputy, was wounded in the leg. Taking the jeep, Pasquet and his men began driving to Port-au-Prince.

Duvalier during July 1958 coup attempt.

En route to the capital the rebels flagged down and commandeered a passing tap tap, one of the brightly decorated mini-bus taxis common in Haiti. Arriving at the Dessalines barracks about 10 p.m., Pasquet bluffed his way past sentries, saying he was delivering prisoners. Before long, however, the tap tap and its occupants attracted the attention of the garrison, and firing broke out. Three Haitian soldiers were shot, and about 50 more – most of whom had been sleeping – were placed under guard, with officers tied to chairs.

Pasquet was disappointed to learn that there was no enthusiasm among the soldiers for a rising against Duvalier, and that most of the arms usually stored at Casernes Dessalines had recently been transferred to the National Palace. Rather than lead an immediate assault on the palace, he entered the commandant's office and began making phone calls to friends in the army – none of whom, to his growing consternation, showed any interest in joining him.

The gunfire – and Pasquet's phone calls – had alerted Duvalier that trouble was afoot at the barracks, but initially he had no idea of the scope of the uprising, and reportedly prepared his family for evacuation to the Liberian embassy. Calling the commandant of the Dessalines barracks, he instead got Pasquet, who infuriated Duvalier by demanding that he surrender immediately.

In a story of uncertain veracity which was later widely reported, one of the plotters (usually identified as Perpignan) was so eager to enjoy his favorite blend of local tobacco that he gave some money to a mulatto soldier and sent him to a nearby store to buy a packet of "Splendide" cigarettes. The soldier – reportedly Duvalier's personal driver – immediately ran to the National Palace, where he informed the Presidential Guard that the rebels were only eight in number, one of them wounded. The small size of the rebel force was confirmed by other soldiers who had managed to escape from the barracks.

While Pasquet frantically called around for help, President Duvalier donned uniform, helmet, and pistol-belt and began rallying his supporters; meanwhile, several Army officers had already begun surrounding and sealing off the Casernes Dessalines, placing heavy machine guns at key positions around the facility.

At daybreak on 29 July the Haitian army's counterattack began, with Pasquet reportedly killed by a grenade blast while still using the phone in the commandant's office. Perpignan was killed while attempting to flee out the back of the building; the wounded American, Arthur Payne, allegedly tried to claim he was an American journalist before being shot, and Levant Kersten may have briefly succeeded in blending into the growing crowd of civilians before being spotted and killed. Dominique and the tattooed captain of the Molly C, Joe Walker, were found in the barracks riddled with bullets. All eight of the rebels were killed.

== Aftermath ==
Pasquet and his men had badly miscalculated the mood of the Haitian public and the military. While Duvalier's dictatorial tendencies were becoming increasingly plain, he was still seen, after a long period of political turmoil, as a strong force for stability and unity. The bodies of some of the coup plotters were dragged through the streets of Port-au-Prince to cheering crowds, and Duvalier was photographed in uniform and hailed in the Haitian press as having led the counterattack on the coup plotters himself.

Pasquet's was the first of many coup attempts against Duvalier's government. It had the effect of deepening Duvalier's fear of any dissent, and inspired him to create a paramilitary and secret police force completely loyal to him. This group, the National Security Volunteers (Les Volontaires de la Sécurité Nationale) or the VSN – the infamous "Tonton Macoutes" – would terrorize Haiti for decades to come.

After the Duvalier era, 'Sonson' Pasquet came to be seen in Haiti as both a foolish and gallant figure. In 1973 his son, also named Alix Pasquet, married and had two children with Michèle Bennett, who later married and had two children with François Duvalier's son, Jean-Claude 'Baby Doc' Duvalier, making 'Sonson' and 'Papa Doc's grandchildren half siblings.
