= Haitian Workers' Party =

Communist party in Haiti

- Haitian Creole name: Pati travayè ayisyen
- French name: Parti des travailleurs haïtiens
- Abbreviation: PTA / PTH
- Founded: 1966
- Ideology: Communism; Marxism–Leninism; Anti-revisionism
- Political position: Far-left

The Haitian Workers' Party (Note: Haitian Creole: Pati travayè ayisyen; French: Parti des travailleurs haïtiens) was an anti-revisionist, Marxist–Leninist communist party in Haiti, founded in 1966. It was relatively well-organized, had a strong presence among agricultural workers, and had extensive links to communists in the neighboring Dominican Republic. The party promoted itself as the only real alternative to the regime of François Duvalier, and attempted to weaken the influence of other opposition groups, particularly the Unified Party of Haitian Communists.

The party had close relations with the Party of Labour of Albania and received financial and operational support from the Albanian communists.
