= 1946 Haitian parliamentary election =

Parliamentary elections were held in Haiti on 12 May 1946. They followed the overthrow of President Élie Lescot's government by Paul Magloire on 11 January.

== Campaign ==
Over 200 candidates contested the 37 seats in the Chamber of Deputies and 21 seats in the Senate. The elections were the first in Haiti to have a significant number of left-wing candidates, and the Haitian Communist Party staged a large demonstration in Port-au-Prince on 1 May.

== Conduct ==
Left-wing candidates claimed that the Ministry of the Interior, headed by coup leader Magloire, had rigged the results. This view was supported by the American embassy after the discovery of the mass sale of electoral cards in the week preceding the elections. An outbreak of violence two days after the elections left five people dead.

== Aftermath ==
On 16 August Dumarsais Estimé was elected President by both houses of Parliament, which had convened to form the National Assembly, defeating Communist Party leader Félix d'Orléans Juste Constant and Démosthènes Pétrus Calixte (the candidate of a coalition including the Worker Peasant Movement) in a second round of voting.

This was the last President who was elected by members of the Chamber of Deputies. The next President would be elected by public vote in 1950.
