= Carl Brouard =

Haitian poet

Carl Brouard (5 December 1902 – November 1965) was a Haitian poet. He is best known for his compilation of poems entitled Ecrit sur du Ruban Rose.

Brouard was born in Port-au-Prince, Haiti. In 1927, Brouard along with Jacques Roumain, Émile Roumer and others formed La Revue Indigene: Les Arts et La Vie (The Indigenous Review: Arts and Life). Following the breakup of the review, Brouard and other former contributors who had begun to embrace what later became known as Noirism, including François Duvalier, began holding political meetings in the home of like-minded law-student Lorimer Dennis. In 1938, Brouard served as co-director of the Noiriste quarterly paper "Les Griots" run by Duvalier and Dennis. Soon after, he converted formally to what he had for so long promoted the value of: Haitian vodou. Deeply depressed and suffering from alcoholism, Brouard left vodou and broke fully from the Noiriste movement in 1942. He became a devout Catholic and remained so until his death in 1965 from complications related to alcoholism.
