= Sténio Vincent =

28th President of Haiti from 1930 to 1941

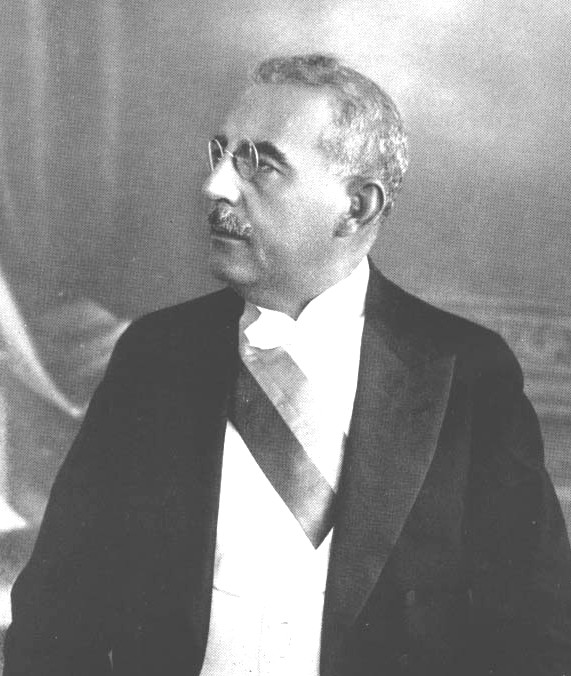

28th President of Haiti
- In office November 18, 1930 – May 15, 1941
- Preceded by: Louis Eugène Roy
- Succeeded by: Élie Lescot

Minister of Interior and Public Works
- In office August 8, 1916 – April 17, 1917
- President: Philippe Sudré Dartiguenave
- Preceded by: Constant Vieux
- Succeeded by: Osmin Cham (Interior); Etienne Magloire (Public Works)

Mayor of Port-au-Prince
- In office January 17, 1907 – January 25, 1909
- Preceded by: Adolphe Sambour
- Succeeded by: Cyrille Liautaud

Personal details
- Born: February 22, 1874 Port-au-Prince, Haiti
- Died: September 3, 1959 (aged 85) New York City, United States
- Parents: Benjamin Vincent (father); Iramène Brea (mother)
- Profession: Lawyer

Sténio Joseph Vincent (French pronunciation: [stenjo ʒozɛf vɛ̃sɑ̃]; February 22, 1874 – September 3, 1959) was a lawyer and Haitian politician who acted as President of Haiti from November 18, 1930, to May 15, 1941. He previously served as Mayor of Port-au-Prince from 1907 to 1909.

== Biography ==
Sténio Vincent was born in Port-au-Prince, Haiti. His parents were Benjamin Vincent and Iramène Brea, who belonged to the mulatto elite.

On January 17, 1907, local elected officials of Port-au-Prince met to form the Communal Council. Elected first councilor, Sténio Vincent was appointed by his peers as mayor of the capital for a 3-year term, alongside deputy mayors E. Séjourné, St-Léger Fortin, and Eugène Paul. Vincent's mayoralty lasted only two years, ending with his resignation on January 25, 1909. His resignation was accepted by the Communal Council, which replaced him with Cyrille Liautaud.

== Presidency ==
In October 1930, while still under occupation by the United States, Haitians elected representatives to the national assembly for the first time since 1918. It elected Vincent as President of Haiti. Sténio Vincent and his team installed themselves in power by exploiting the anti-American sentiment of the popular masses. He had graduated from law school at age 18 before ascending to head of Haiti's Chamber of Deputies by 1915. He supported Haitian nationalism and ran a nationalist campaign for the presidency based on his fierce opposition to the United States occupation of Haiti.

From 1915 to 1934, Haiti was occupied by U.S. Marines; the United States had intervened after the murder of President Vilbrun Guillaume Sam. In August 1934 U.S. President Franklin D. Roosevelt withdrew the Marines; however, the United States maintained direct fiscal control until 1941 and indirect control over Haiti until 1947.

In 1935, Vincent conducted a plebiscite about extending his term in office, receiving a favorable vote to extend it to 1941. The plebiscite also approved an amendment to the constitution so that future presidents would be elected by popular vote.

In 1936, the Haitian Communist Party was disbanded by Vincent.

In October 1937, troops and police from the Dominican Republic massacred thousands of Haitian labourers living near the border in the Parsley Massacre. Vincent had enjoyed a cooperative relationship with and financial support from the government of Dominican President Rafael Trujillo. After two years of relative quiet in Port-au-Prince, Vincent's failure to press for justice for the slain workers prompted protests in the capital. United States president Franklin D. Roosevelt took the case to the Dominican government, which agreed in 1938 to compensate the slain workers’ relatives the following year.

In 1941, Vincent declared his intention to step down. The presidency was peacefully transitioned to his successor, Élie Lescot.

Political offices
Preceded by Louis Eugène Roy	President of Haïti; 1930–1941	Succeeded by Élie Lescot
