= Élie Lescot =

29th President of Haiti from 1941 to 1946

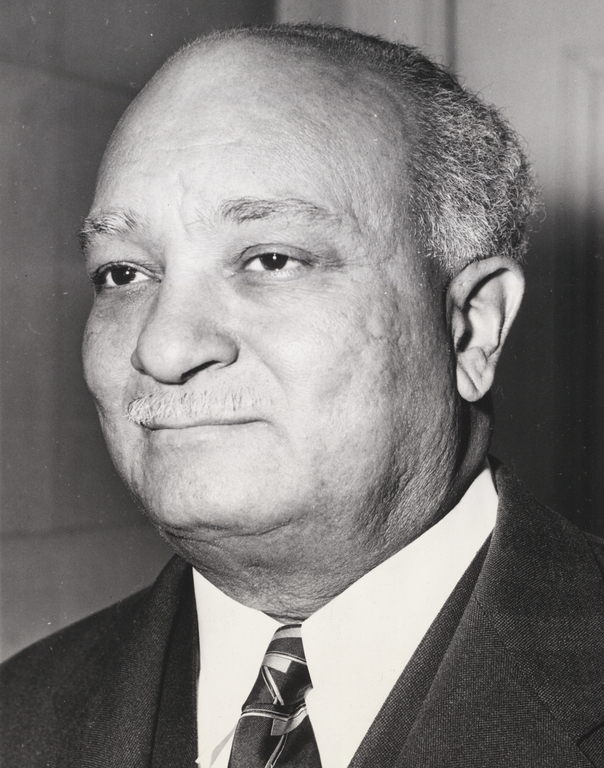

29th President of Haiti
- In office May 15, 1941 – January 11, 1946
- Preceded by: Sténio Vincent
- Succeeded by: Franck Lavaud (Chairman of the Military Executive Committee)

Minister of Interior
- In office September 20, 1933 – May 15, 1934
- President: Sténio Vincent
- Preceded by: Himself
- Succeeded by: Joseph Titus

Minister of Interior and Justice
- In office May 17, 1932 – September 20, 1933
- President: Sténio Vincent
- Preceded by: Emmanuel Rampy
- Succeeded by: Himself (Interior); Joseph Titus (Justice)

Minister of National Education, Agriculture and Labor
- In office January 27, 1930 – April 22, 1930
- President: Louis Borno
- Preceded by: Hannibal Price IV
- Succeeded by: Louis Edouard Rousseau

Personal details
- Born: Antoine Louis Léocardie Élie Lescot; December 9, 1883 Saint-Louis-du-Nord, Haiti
- Died: October 20, 1974 (aged 90) Laboule, Haiti
- Party: Liberal Party
- Other political affiliations: Haitian Republican Party
- Spouse(s): Corinne Jean-Pierre, Georgina Saint-Aude (1892–1984)
- Children: Andrée Lescot
- Profession: Pharmacist

Antoine Louis Léocardie Élie Lescot (French pronunciation: [ɑ̃twan lwi leokaʁdi eli lɛsko]; December 9, 1883 – October 20, 1974) was the President of Haiti from May 15, 1941 to January 11, 1946. He was a member of the country's mixed-race elite. He used the political climate of World War II to sustain his power and ties to the United States of America, Haiti's powerful northern neighbor. His administration presided over a period of economic downturn and harsh political repression of dissidents. He was the last Haitian head of state to have been born in the 19th century.

== Early life ==
Lescot was born in Saint-Louis-du-Nord to a middle-class mixed-race family, descended from free persons of color in the colonial era. He traveled to Port-au-Prince to study pharmacy after completing his secondary education in Cap-Haïtien. He settled in Port-de-Paix to work in the export-import business.

After his first wife died in 1911, Lescot entered politics. He was elected to the Chamber of Deputies two years later. After a four-year stay in France during the United States occupation of Haiti (1915 to 1934), he returned and held posts in the Louis Borno and Sténio Vincent administrations. Four years later he was named ambassador to the neighboring Dominican Republic, where he forged an alliance with President Rafael Trujillo. He moved to Washington, D.C., after being appointed ambassador to the United States.

== Wartime election ==
His close political and economic ties to the United States helped lay the groundwork for his ascendancy to Haiti's presidency, and he received the State Department's tacit backing for his campaign to succeed Sténio Vincent in 1941. Prominent members of the Chamber of Deputies opposed his candidacy, arguing Haiti needed a black president from a majority African ancestry. Taking the advantage of Trujillo's influence, Lescot was said to buy his way into power. He won 56 out of 58 votes cast by legislators. Deputy Max Hudicourt claimed the margin of victory was due to intimidation and beatings of legislators.

Lescot quickly moved to consolidate his control over the state apparatus, naming himself head of the Military Guard and appointing a clique of white and mixed-race members of the elite to major government posts, including his own sons. This action earned him great disdain among Haiti's large majority of ethnic Africans.

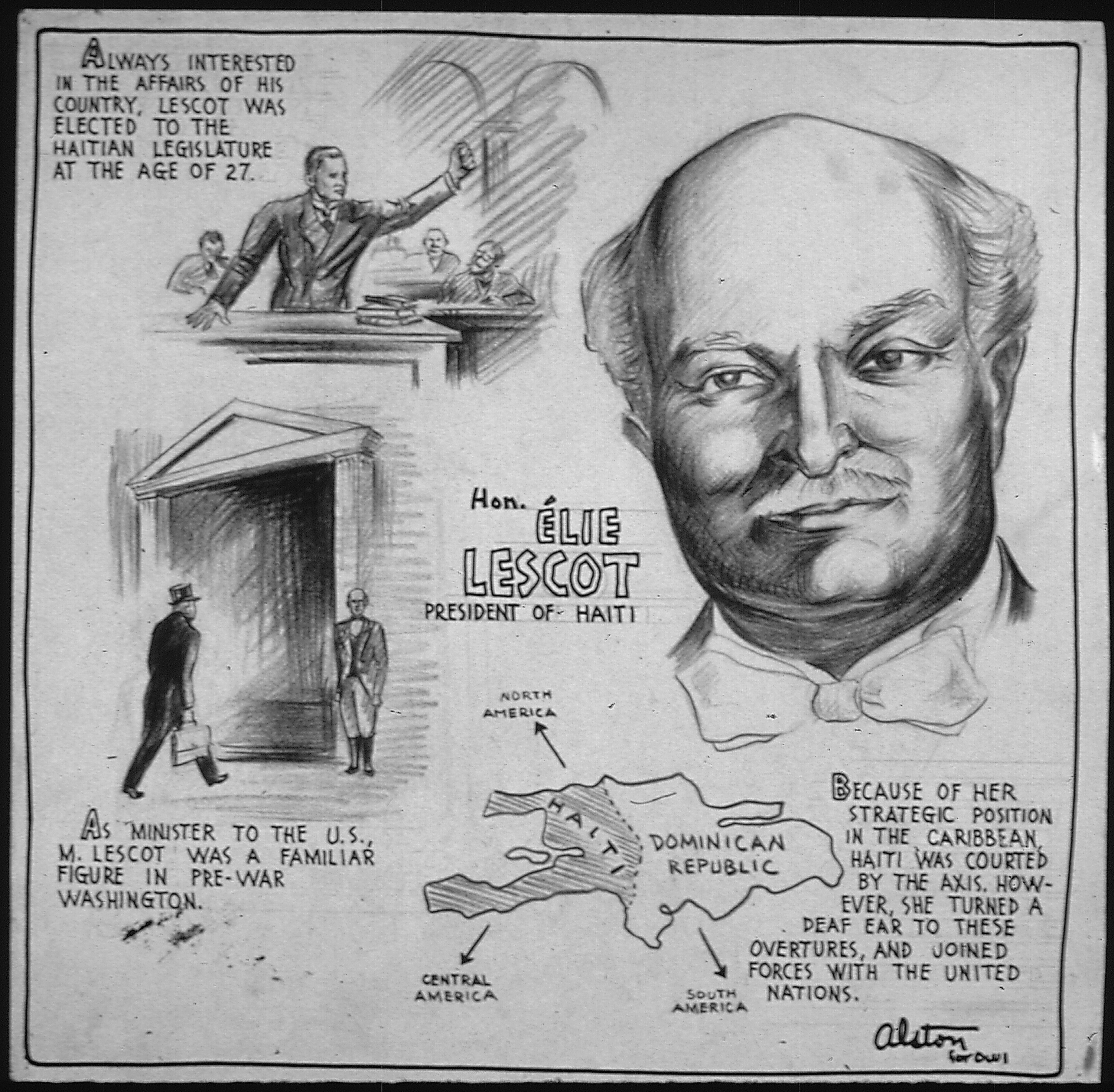
Poster from U.S. Office of War Information. Domestic Operations Branch. News Bureau, 1943

After the bombing of Pearl Harbor, Lescot declared war on the Axis Powers and pledged all necessary support to the Allied war effort. His government offered refuge to European Jews on Haitian soil in cooperation with Trujillo. In 1942 Lescot claimed the war required the suspension of the constitution and had the parliament give him unlimited executive powers. Political opponents were subject to physical harassment and surveillance by security forces.

== Failed rubber cultivation program ==
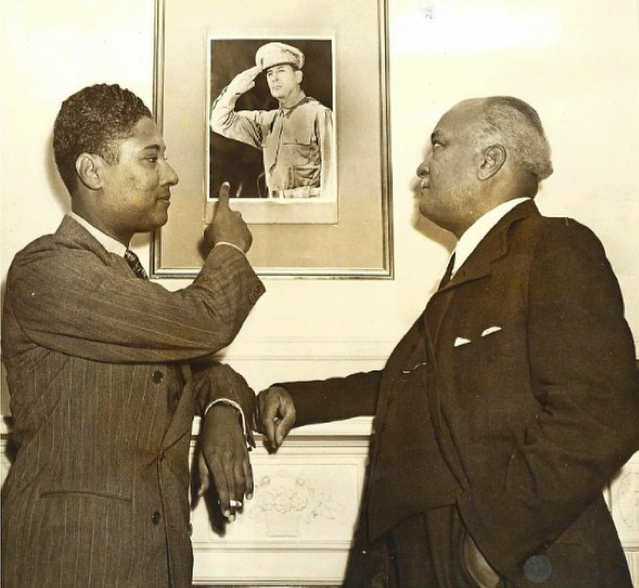
Lescot (right) with Maurice Dartigue (left), the vice president of SHADA

As an Axis blockade cut off rubber supplies from the East, Lescot's administration began an ambitious program, in cooperation with the United States, to expand wartime production of rubber in the Haitian countryside. The Export-Import Bank in Washington granted $5 million in 1941 for the development of rubber plants in Haiti. The program was called the Société Haïtiano-Américane de Développement Agricole (SHADA) and managed by American agronomist Thomas Fennell.

SHADA began production in 1941 with the provision of ample military support per contract with the US government. By 1943, an estimated 47,177 acres (190.92 km^{2}) were cleared for the planting of cryptostegia vine, which was considered to yield high amounts of latex. The program eventually claimed over 100,000 hectares of land. Farmers in Haiti's northern countryside were lured from food crop cultivation to meet increasing demand for rubber.

Lescot energetically campaigned on SHADA's behalf, arguing the program would modernize Haitian agriculture. The United States also promoted the project with a robust public relations campaign. Peasant families were forcibly removed from Haiti's most arable tracts of land. After nearly a million fruit-bearing trees in Jérémie were cut down and peasant houses invaded or razed, the Haitian Minister of Agriculture, Maurice Dartigue, wrote to Fennell asking him to respect "the mentality and legitimate interests of the Haitian peasant and city-dwellers." But yields did not meet expectations, and insufficient amounts of rubber were produced to generate significant exports. Droughts contributed to poor harvests.

"The worst thing that can be said of SHADA is that they are doing [their operations] at considerable expense to the American taxpayer and in a manner that does not command the respect of the Haitian people", concluded a survey by the US military. The US government offered $175,000 as compensation to displaced peasants after recommending the program's cancellation.

Lescot feared SHADA's termination would add the burden of higher unemployment (at its height it employed over 90,000 people) to a sinking economy and hurt his public image. He asked the Rubber Development Corporation to extend its closing of the program gradually until the end of the war, but was refused.

== Decline and exile ==
With his government near bankruptcy and struggling with a flagging economy, Lescot pleaded unsuccessfully with the United States for an extension on debt repayments. Relations between Lescot and Trujillo in the Dominican Republic broke down. In Haiti he expanded the corps of the Military Guard, including a core of light-skinned commanding officers. A system of rural police chiefs, known as chefs de section, ruled by force and intimidation. In 1944 low-ranking black soldiers plotting rebellion were caught, and seven of them were executed without court-martial.

That same year Lescot extended his presidential term from five years to seven. In late 1945, an anti-Lescot student newspaper called La Ruche published its first issue in Port-au-Prince. The newspaper eschewed race-based politics and equated Lescot with Mussolini. Lescot also got accused to be a fascist, similar to Borno, which also got seen as a fascist. By 1946, his attempts to muzzle the opposition press sparked fierce student demonstrations; a revolt broke out in Port-au-Prince. Black-empowerment noirists, Marxists, and populist leaders joined forces in opposition. Crowds protested outside the National Palace, workers went on strike, and the homes of authorities were ransacked. Lescot's mulatto-dominated government was highly resented by Haiti's predominantly black military Garde.

Lescot tried to order the Military Guard to break up the demonstrations, but was rebuffed. Convinced their lives were in danger, Lescot and his cabinet fled into exile. A three-person military junta took power in his place and pledged to organize elections. In the immediate aftermath of Lescot's exile, an independent radio and print press flourished and long-repressed dissident groups expressed optimism about Haiti's future. Dumarsais Estimé eventually succeeded Lescot as head of the republic, becoming Haiti's first black president since the US occupation.

Political offices
Preceded by Sténio Vincent	President of Haïti; 1941–1946	Succeeded by Franck Lavaud
