= Puerto Rico =

U.S. territory in the Caribbean

- Unincorporated and organized territory
- Commonwealth of Puerto Rico (Note: The definition of Commonwealth according to U.S. State Department policy (as codified in the department's Foreign Affairs Manual) reads: "The term 'Commonwealth' does not describe or provide for any specific political status or relationship."); Estado Libre Asociado de Puerto Rico (Spanish)
- Flag Coat of arms
- Nickname(s): "La Isla del Encanto" (Spanish) ('The Island of Enchantment')
- Motto: Joannes est nomen ejus (Latin) ('John is his name')
- Anthem: "La Borinqueña" (Spanish) ('The Song of Borinquen')
- Sovereign state: United States (Note: Neither a sovereign state nor a U.S. state, Puerto Rico is a self-governing unincorporated U.S. territory subject to the constitutional and territorial sovereignty of the U.S. federal government. Specifically, the U.S. Congress has plenary authority or unlimited power over the archipelago and island through the Territorial Clause in Article IV of the U.S. Constitution, which applies selectively in Puerto Rico, as it is not incorporated into the United States. As such, it operates as an administrative division and dependent territory belonging to, but not an integral part of, the United States, namely the 50 states and the federal District of Columbia. See Government of Puerto Rico and Insular Cases for more information.) Establishment: Invasion and annexation (July 25, 1898); Acquisition (October 18, 1898); Cession (December 10, 1898); Civil governance (May 1, 1900); Self-governance (July 25, 1952)
- Preceding state: Spanish Empire Establishment: First landing (November 19, 1493); Colonization (August 12, 1508); Governorate (1508–1582); Captaincy General (1582–1898); Autonomous Province (1898)
- Capital and largest municipality: San Juan; 18°24′23″N 66°03′50″W
- Largest metro area: San Juan
- Official languages: Spanish; English
- Ethnic groups (2020): 49.78% Mixed; 25.51% Other; 17.06% White; 6.96% Black; 0.54% Native; 0.12% Asian; 0.02% Pacific Islander
- Religion (2020): 88.9% Christian; 10% unaffiliated; <1% other
- Demonym(s): Puerto Rican; Boricua (Note: Puerto Rican or Puertorriqueño -a (Spanish) is the official demonym for Puerto Ricans, while boricua is a widely used colloquial demonym for Puerto Ricans. Other colloquial names are borinqueño -a, borincano -a, and puertorro -a. The name boricua is gender-neutral, whereas the names puertorriqueño, borinqueño, borincano, and puertorro are male-specific when ending in «o» and female-specific when ending in «a».)
- Government: Devolved presidential constitutional dependency
  - President: Donald Trump (R)
  - Governor: Jenniffer González (PNP)(R)
  - Secretary of State: Rosachely Rivera (PNP)(D)
- Legislature: Legislative Assembly
  - Upper house: Senate
  - Lower house: House of Representatives

United States Congress
  - Resident Commissioner: Pablo Hernández (PPD)(D)

Area (Note: The area of the island of Puerto Rico, the main island of the archipelago of the same name, is 5,325 square miles (13,792 km^{2}). The land and internal costal water area of the island is 3,513 sq mi (9,100 km^{2}), with land covering 3,424 sq mi (8,868 km^{2}) and internal costal waters 89 sq mi (232 km^{2}). The territorial sea of the island stretches for 1,812 sq mi (4,692 km^{2}). Including the islands of Vieques with a land area of 51 sq mi (132 km^{2}), Mona with 22 sq mi (56 km^{2}), Culebra with 12 sq mi (31 km^{2}), Caja de Muertos with 0.62 sq mi (1.62 km^{2}), and Desecheo with 0.56 sq mi (1.45 km^{2}), the entire archipelago of Puerto Rico has a land area of at least 3,510 sq mi (9,090 km^{2}). The exclusive economic zone of the archipelago covers 68,605 sq mi (177,327 km^{2}).)
  - Total: 13,792 km^{2} (5,325 sq mi)
  - Land: 8,868 km^{2} (3,424 sq mi)(186th)
  - Water: 4,924 km^{2} (1,901 sq mi)
  - Water (%): 35.6

Dimensions
  - Length: 177 (Note: Puerto Rico, the main island of the archipelago of the same name, is 178 kilometers long (110 statute miles; 96 nautical miles) and 65 kilometers wide (40 statute miles; 35 nautical miles). Boricuas often refer to Puerto Rico as 100x35 (Spanish: 100por35), a direct reference to the island's size in nautical miles.) km (110 mi)
  - Width: 65 km (40 mi)
- Highest elevation (Cerro de Punta): 1,338 m (4,390 ft)
- Lowest elevation (Atlantic Ocean): 0 m (0 ft)

Population (Note: Puerto Rico is the 4th most populated island in the Caribbean, 27th most populated island in the world, and 135th most populated country or dependency in the world. Within the United States, it is the 33rd most populous state or territory.)
  - 2025 estimate: ▼3,184,195 (135th)
  - 2020 census: ▼3,285,874
  - Density: 358.9/km^{2} (929.5/sq mi) (37th)
- GDP (PPP): 2026 estimate
  - Total: ▲$171.634 billion (92nd)
  - Per capita: ▲$53,917 (39th)
- GDP (nominal): 2026 estimate
  - Total: ▲$133.222 billion (64th)
  - Per capita: ▲$41,851 (27th)
- Gini (2024): 58 high
- HDI (2022): ▲0.868 very high · 47th
- Currency: U.S. dollar ($) (USD)
- Time zone: UTC−04:00 (AST)
- Date format: dd/mm/yyyy; mm/dd/yyyy
- Driving side: Right
- Calling code: +1
- USPS abbreviation: PR
- ISO 3166 code: PR; US-PR
- Internet TLD: .pr
- Website: pr.gov

Puerto Rico (Note: English pronunciation: /ˌpɔːrtoʊ ˈriːkoʊ, ˌpwɛərtoʊ -, -tə -/ POR-toh REE-koh, PWAIR-toh -, -tə - Spanish pronunciation: [ˈpweɾto ˈriko], locally (in rural areas) [ˈpwelto ˈχiko, - ˈʀ̥iko] Taino: Borikén or Borinquen) (abbreviated PR), officially the Commonwealth of Puerto Rico, (Note: Spanish: Estado Libre Asociado de Puerto Rico, lit. 'Free Associated State of Puerto Rico') is a self-governing Caribbean archipelago and island organized as an unincorporated territory of the United States under the designation of commonwealth. Located about 1,000 miles (1,600 km) southeast of Miami, Florida, between the Dominican Republic in the Greater Antilles and the U.S. Virgin Islands in the Lesser Antilles, it consists of the eponymous main island and numerous smaller islands, including Vieques, Culebra, and Mona. With approximately 3.2 million people, it is divided into 78 municipalities, of which the most populous is the capital municipality of San Juan, followed by those within the San Juan metropolitan area. Spanish and English are the official languages of its government, though Spanish predominates, as it is culturally part of Latin America.

Puerto Rico was settled by a succession of Indigenous peoples of the Americas beginning 2,000 to 4,000 years ago; these included the Ortoiroid, Saladoid, and Taíno. It was claimed by Spain following the arrival of Christopher Columbus in 1493 and subsequently colonized by Juan Ponce de León in 1508. Puerto Rico was contested by other European powers into the 18th century but remained a Spanish possession for the next 400 years. The decline of the Indigenous population, followed by an influx of Spanish settlers—primarily from the Canary Islands and Andalusia—and African slaves vastly changed the cultural and demographic landscape. Within the Spanish Empire, Puerto Rico played a strategically significant role. By the late 19th century, a distinct Puerto Rican identity began to emerge, centered on a fusion of European, African, and Indigenous elements. In 1898, following the Spanish–American War, Puerto Rico was acquired by the United States. (Note: Puerto Rico was acquired along with Guam and the Philippines via the 1898 Treaty of Paris ending the Spanish–American War. The Philippines became independent via the 1946 Treaty of Manila; Puerto Rico and Guam remain U.S. territories today.)

Puerto Ricans have been U.S. citizens since 1917 and can move freely between the archipelago and the U.S. Residents of Puerto Rico are disenfranchised from federal elections and pay federal taxes and Puerto Rico income taxes; most are exempt from federal income tax on personal income earned in Puerto Rico. (Note: See the Political status of Puerto Rico article for more information.) Puerto Rico sends a nonvoting representative to the U.S. Congress, called a resident commissioner, and participates in presidential primaries; as it is not a state, Puerto Rico does not have a vote in the U.S. Congress, which oversees it under the Puerto Rico Federal Relations Act of 1950. Congress approved a territorial constitution in 1952, allowing residents to elect a governor in addition to a senate and house of representatives. The political status of Puerto Rico is an ongoing debate.

Beginning in the mid-20th century, the U.S. government, together with the Puerto Rico Industrial Development Company, launched a series of economic projects to develop Puerto Rico into an industrial high-income economy. It is classified by the International Monetary Fund as a developed jurisdiction. It ranks 47th on the Human Development Index. The major sectors of the economy are manufacturing, primarily pharmaceuticals, petrochemicals, and electronics, followed by services, namely tourism and hospitality.

== Etymology ==
Puerto Rico is Spanish for 'rich port'. Puerto Ricans often call the island Boricua, derived from the Indigenous term Boriquen (or Borinquen), which is popularly said to mean 'Land of the Valiant Lord'. The terms boricua, borinqueño, and borincano are commonly used to identify someone of Puerto Rican heritage, and derive from the term Boriquen/Borinquen. The island is popularly known in Spanish as La Isla del Encanto, meaning "the island of enchantment".

Christopher Columbus named the island San Juan Bautista in honor of Saint John the Baptist, while the capital city was named Ciudad de Puerto Rico ("Rich Port City"). Eventually traders and other maritime visitors came to refer to the entire island as Puerto Rico, while San Juan became the name used for the main trading/shipping port and the capital city. (Note: Proyecto Salón Hogar (in Spanish) "Los españoles le cambiaron el nombre de Borikén a San Juan Bautista y a la capital le llamaron Ciudad de Puerto Rico. Con los años, Ciudad de Puerto Rico pasó a ser San Juan, y San Juan Bautista pasó a ser Puerto Rico. The Spaniards changed the name of Borikén to San Juan Bautista and called the capital Ciudad de Puerto Rico. Over time, Ciudad de Puerto Rico came to be called San Juan, and San Juan Bautista came to be called Puerto Rico.")

The name was changed to Porto Rico by the United States after the Treaty of Paris of 1898. The anglicized name was used by the U.S. government and private enterprises. The name was changed back to Puerto Rico in 1931 by a joint resolution in Congress introduced by Félix Córdova Dávila. (Note: In 1932, the U.S. Congress officially back-corrected the former anglicization of Porto Rico into the Spanish name Puerto Rico. It had been using the former spelling in its legislative and judicial records since it acquired the archipelago. Patricia Gherovici states that both Porto Rico and Puerto Rico were used interchangeably in the news media and documentation before, during, and after the U.S. conquest of the island in 1898. The Porto spelling, for instance, was used in the Treaty of Paris, but Puerto was used by The New York Times that same year. Nancy Morris clarifies that "a curious oversight in the drafting of the Foraker Act caused the name of the island to be officially misspelled". However, Gervasio Luis Garcia traces the Anglicized spelling to a National Geographic article from 1899, after which the spelling was kept by many agencies and entities because of the ethnic and linguistic pride of the English-speaking citizens of the American mainland.)

The official name in Spanish is Estado Libre Asociado de Puerto Rico ("Free Associated State of Puerto Rico"), while its official English name is Commonwealth of Puerto Rico. The Spanish official name was suggested by its architect Luis Muñoz Marín and adopted by a constitutional assembly on July 25, 1952. Some authorities have called it a euphemism and have charged that the official name in English of "Commonwealth" constitutes a fig leaf, i.e., associated with the covering up of an act that is actually embarrassing or distasteful with something of innocuous appearance. Puerto Rico remains a colony of the United States, exercising substantial internal self-government but subordinated to the U.S. Constitution in areas such as foreign affairs or defense. For this reason, it is not considered to be a full-fledged associated state under either international or U.S. domestic law.

== History ==
=== Early settlement and European conquest ===
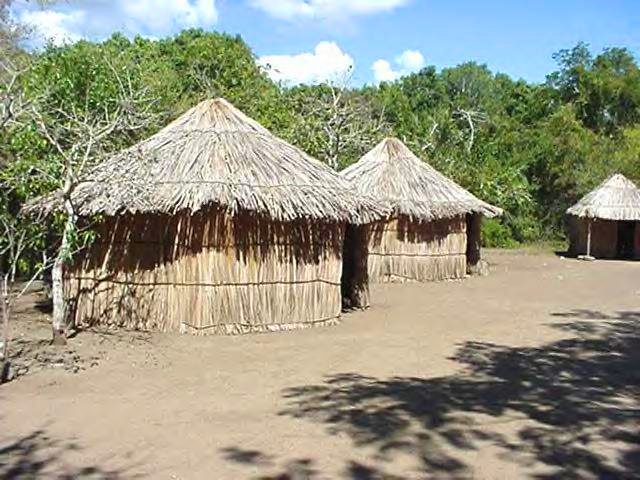
A 20th-century reconstruction of an 8th-century Taíno village, located at the spot in which their remains were discovered in 1975, in the aftermath of Hurricane Eloise

The history of Puerto Rico began with the settlement of the Ortoiroid culture, an Archaic population characterized by a hunter-gatherer subsistence strategy and a pre-ceramic material culture. Archaeological evidence suggests that these early populations may have been present in Puerto Rico as early as c. 4000 years before present.

Around 500–200 BC, Saladoid populations originating from the Orinoco River basin migrated to Puerto Rico, introducing sedentary agriculture and ceramics. Genetic evidence suggests that this migration was associated with a major demographic transition in which Saladoid-related ancestry became predominant in later Ceramic Age populations that developed into the Taíno.

At the time of Columbus's arrival in the New World in 1493, the dominant indigenous peoples were the Taíno. The Taíno population declined significantly during the 16th century due to introduced infectious diseases, exploitation by Spanish settlers, and warfare.

Located in the northeastern Caribbean, Puerto Rico formed a key part of the Spanish Empire from the early years of the exploration, conquest and colonization of the New World. The island was a major military post during many wars between Spain and other European powers for control of the region in the 16th, 17th and 18th centuries.

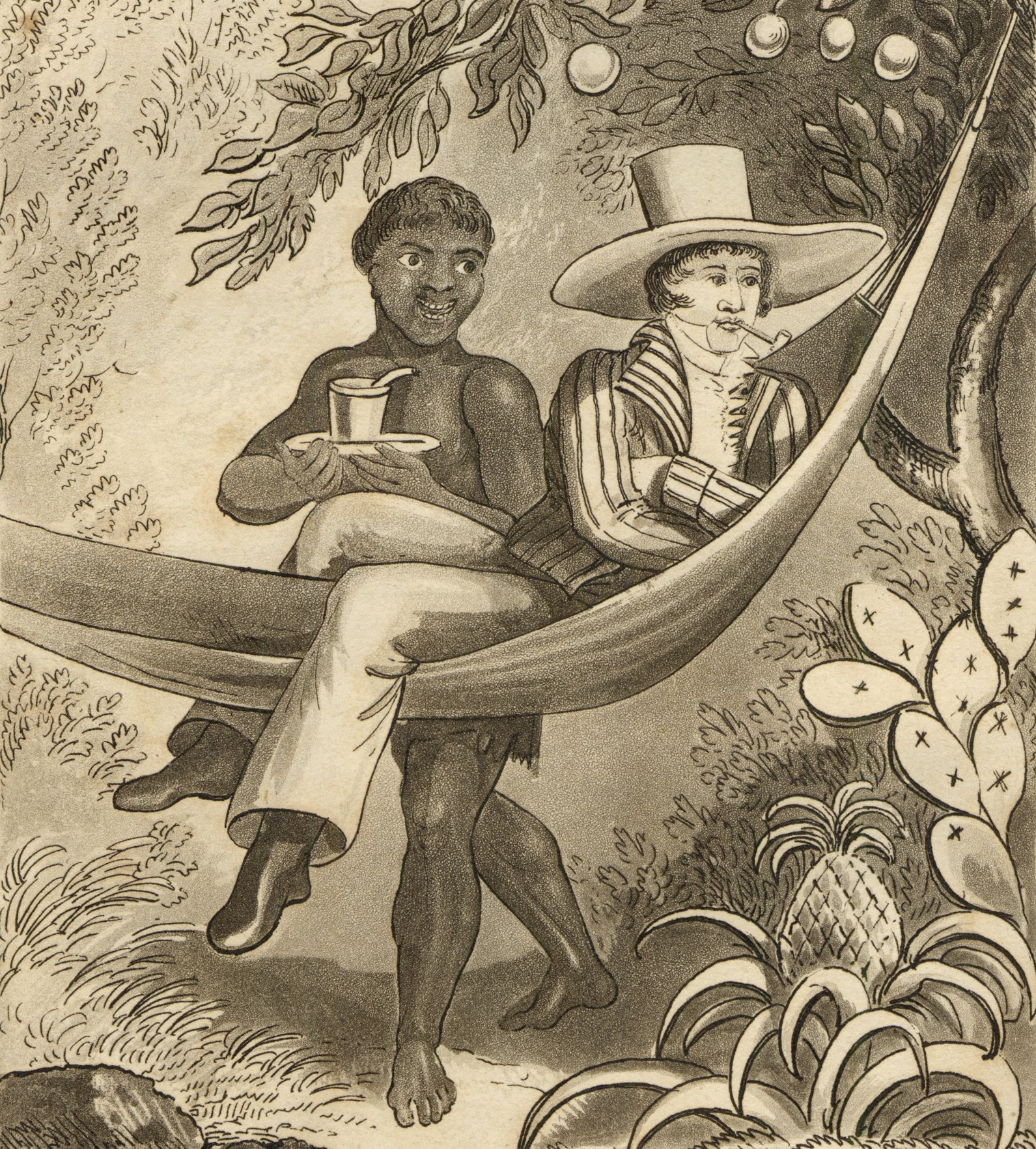
Spanish Planter of Puerto Rico with House Slave, ca.1808

In 1593, Portuguese soldiers, sent from Lisbon by order of Phillip II, composed the first garrison of the San Felipe del Morro fortress in Puerto Rico. Some brought their wives, while others married Puerto Rican women, and today there are many Puerto Rican families with Portuguese last names. The smallest of the Greater Antilles, Puerto Rico was a stepping-stone in the passage from Europe to Cuba, Mexico, Central America, and the northern territories of South America.

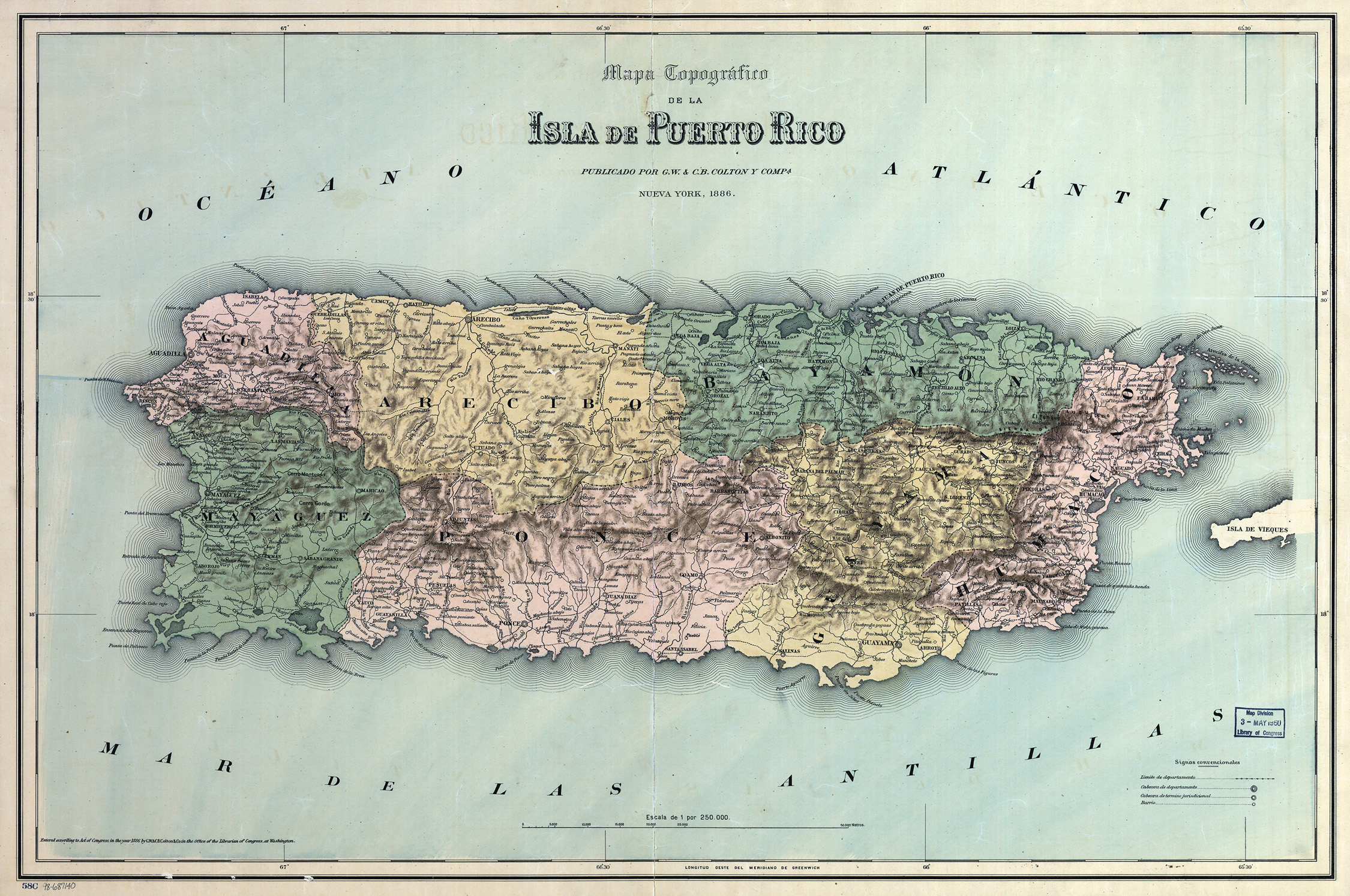
Map of the departments of Puerto Rico during Spanish provincial times (1886)

Throughout most of the 19th century until the conclusion of the Spanish–American War, Puerto Rico and Cuba were the last two Spanish colonies in the New World; they served as Spain's final outposts in a strategy to regain control of the American continents. Realizing that it was in danger of losing its two remaining Caribbean territories, the Spanish Crown revived the Royal Decree of Graces of 1815. The decree was printed in Spanish, English and French in order to attract Europeans, with the hope that the independence movements would lose their popularity and strength with the arrival of new settlers. Free land was offered to those who wanted to populate the islands on the condition that they swear their loyalty to the Spanish Crown and allegiance to the Catholic Church.

=== U.S. era ===
In 1898, during the Spanish–American War, Puerto Rico was invaded and subsequently became a possession of the U.S. The first years of the 20th century were marked by the struggle to obtain greater democratic rights from the U.S.

The Foraker Act of 1900 established a civil government, ending rule by American generals and the Department of War. A 1906 U.S. Supreme Court ruling, Ortega v. Lara, 202 U.S. 339, 342, (Note: Text of Ortega v. Lara, 202 U.S. 339, 342 (1906) is available from: Cornell Findlaw Internet Archive (docket files) Justia OpenJurist) involving the Foraker Act and referring to the island as "the acquired country", affirmed that the U.S. Constitution applied within its territory and that any domestic Puerto Rican laws which did not conflict with it remained in force.

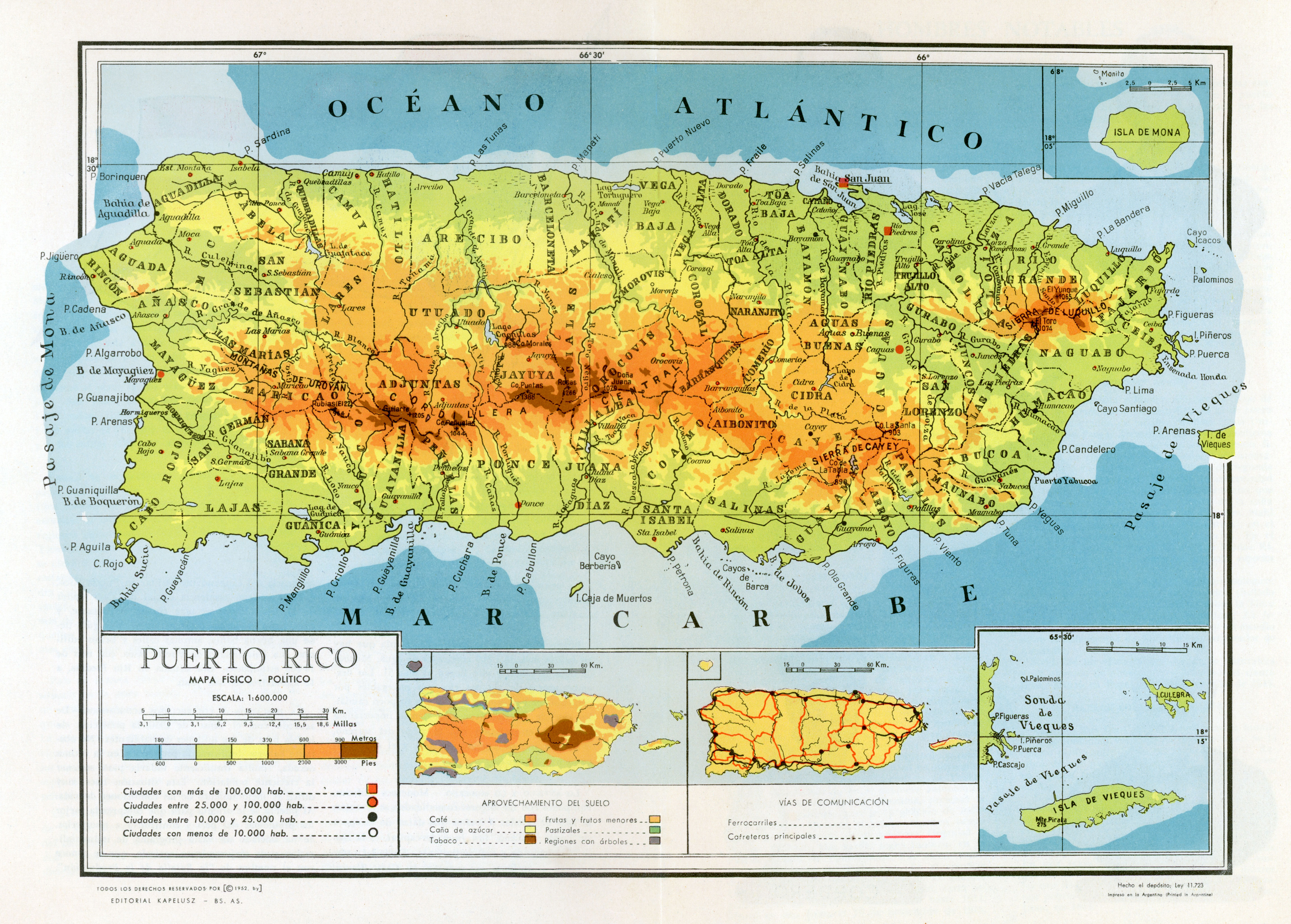
Map of Puerto Rico from 1952

The Jones–Shafroth Act of 1917 made Puerto Ricans U.S. citizens. The act paved the way for the drafting of Puerto Rico's Constitution and its approval by Congress and Puerto Rican voters in 1952. During the Cold War period, Puerto Rican politics continued to be shaped by debates over political status-particularly independence and the meaning of the commonwealth arrangement established in 1952. In the early commonwealth years, pro-independence organizing continued but it faced significant legal and policing restrictions, including the 1948 Ley de la Mordaza (Law 53), which curtailed a range of political expression associated with the independence movement. The period also included high-profile nationalist actions intended to draw attention to independence demands, including the 1950 uprisings and the 1954 attack in the U.S. House of Representatives. During this time, the constitution took effect after congressional review required amendments as a condition of approval, most notably the removal of Article II, Section 20 (a social and economic rights provision), before Puerto Rico's constitutional convention accepted the revisions and put into effect the final text. Puerto Ricans also served in U.S. military operations; the 65th Infantry Regiment (the "Borinqueneers") fought in the Korean War between 1950 and 1953. Puerto Rico is one of five territories with less representation in the federal government, along with Washington, D.C.

=== 21st century ===
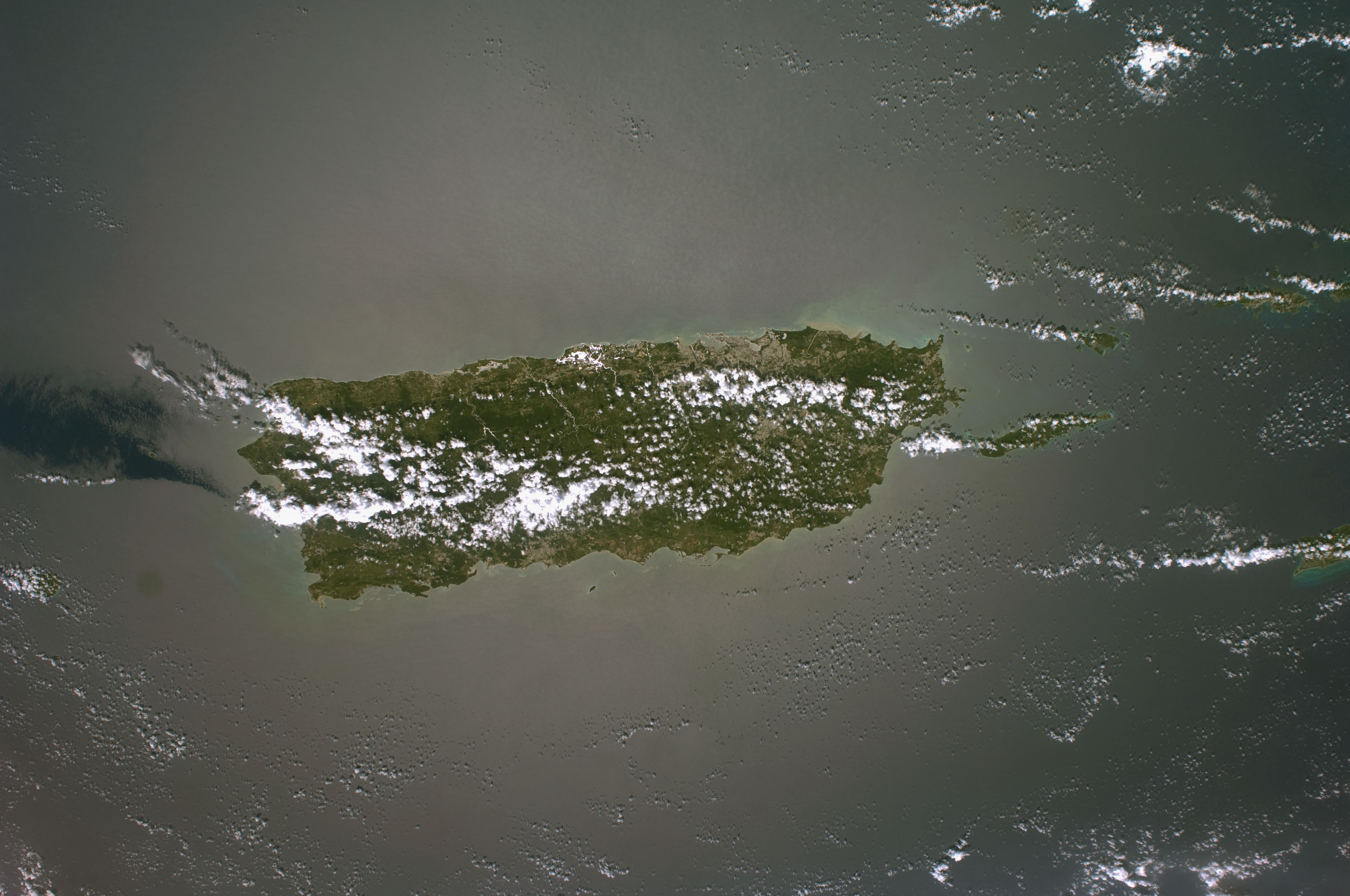
Puerto Rico from space, 2008

In 2009 the United Nations Special Committee on Decolonization approved a draft resolution calling on the U.S. government to expedite a process that would allow the Puerto Rican people to exercise fully their inalienable right to self-determination and independence. In 2012, a two-question referendum took place, simultaneous with the general elections. The first question, voted on in August, asked voters whether they wanted to maintain the current status under the territorial clause of the U.S. Constitution. 54% voted against the status quo, effectively approving the second question to be voted on in November. The second question posed three alternate status options: statehood, independence, or free association. 61.16% voted for statehood, 33.34% for a sovereign free-associated state, and 5.49% for independence. A 2017 status referendum also indicated a desire for statehood, although voter turnout was meager.

The 2016 Puerto Rico Oversight, Management, and Economic Stability Act established a financial oversight board to oversee debt restructuring in response to the Puerto Rican government-debt crisis. In particular, the authority to establish the control board derives from the federal government's constitutional power to "make all needful rules and regulations" regarding U.S. territories. By May 2017, with $123 billion in debt owed by the Puerto Rican government and its corporations, the board requested the appointment of a federal judge to resolve the "largest bankruptcy case in the history of the American public bond market."

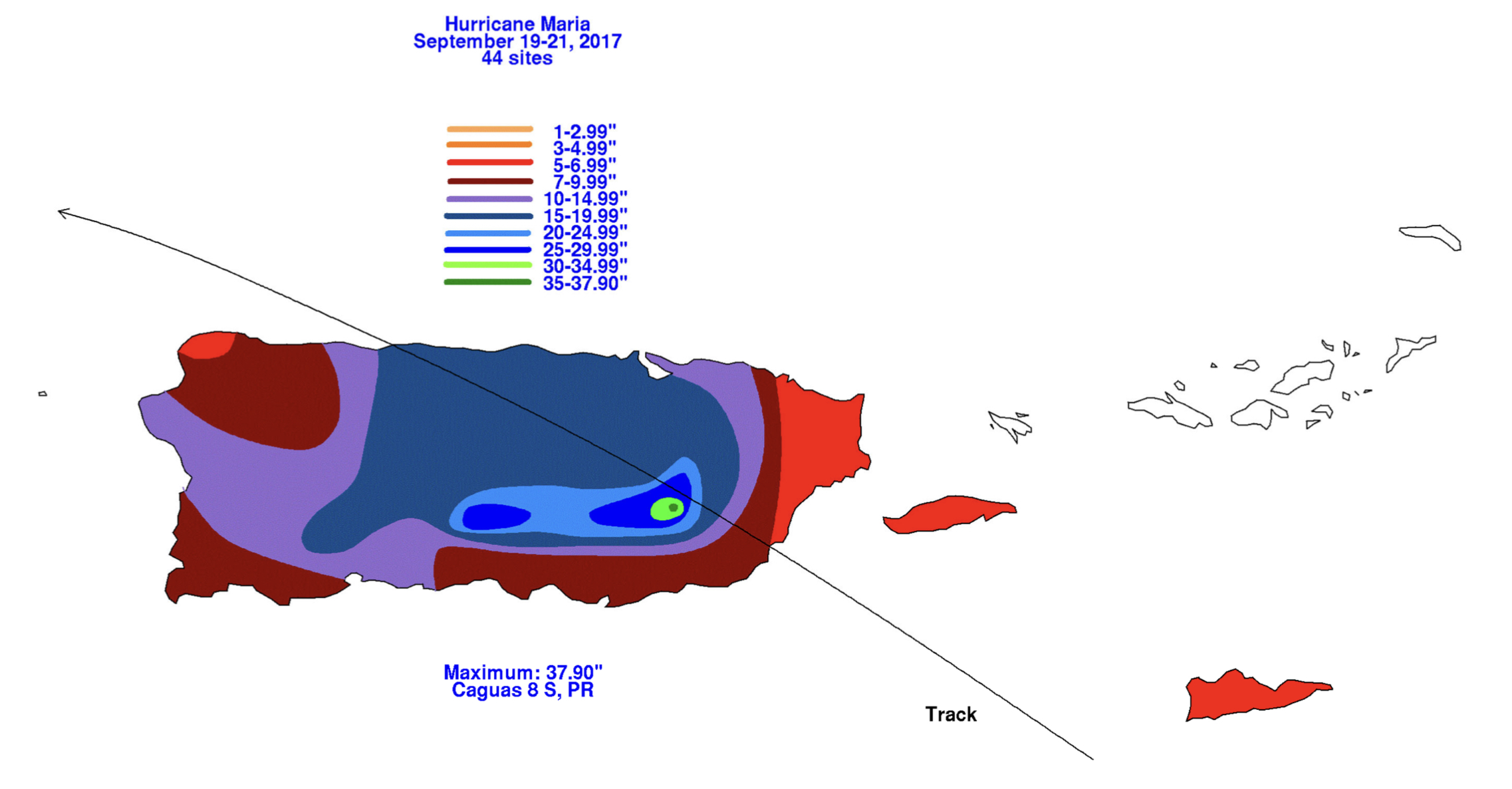
Rainfall totals from Hurricane Maria

In 2017, Puerto Rico suffered back-to-back large hurricanes: the Category 5 Hurricane Irma and the Category 4 Hurricane Maria. The storms caused an extreme amount of damage to the island: all power was knocked out, 95% of cell service, 43% of waste water treatment plants, 40,000 land slides, 97% of roads blocked, 28% of health facilities damaged, leading to over 90% of the population applying for assistance after the storms.

A combination of the debt crisis and two major hurricanes in the late 2010s caused further departures from the island. Overall, the population has decreased by about half a million in the 21st century, with many seeking better opportunities on the mainland.

Puerto Rico held its statehood referendum during the November 3, 2020, general elections; the ballot asked one question: "Should Puerto Rico be admitted immediately into the Union as a State?" The results showed that 52 percent of Puerto Rico voters answered yes. In the United States in the early 2020s, the Puerto Rico Status Act was being worked on by Congress, and H.R. 8393 passed the House in 2022—though it did not pass the Senate. In the November 5, 2024, elections, Puerto Ricans again voted for statehood. Jenniffer González-Colón, who is pro-statehood, won the office of governor with nearly 40% of the vote.

== Geography ==
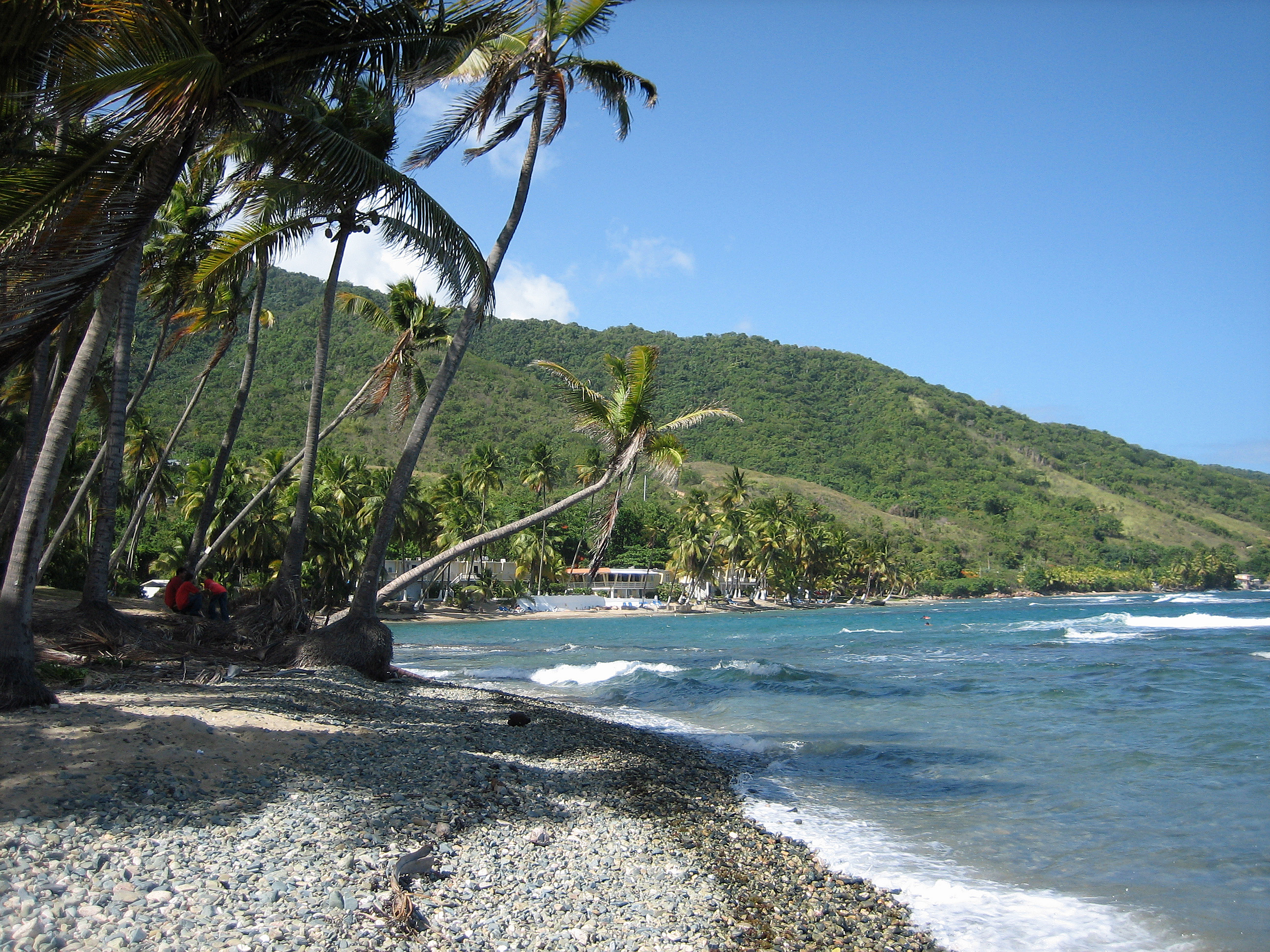
Beach and coastline at Patillas, in southeast Puerto Rico

Puerto Rico consists of the main island and various smaller islands, including Vieques, Culebra, Mona, Desecheo, and Caja de Muertos. Of these, only Culebra and Vieques are inhabited year-round. Mona, which has played a key role in maritime history, is uninhabited most of the year except for employees of the Puerto Rico Department of Natural Resources. There are many other islets, like Monito, located near Mona, and Isla de Cabras and La Isleta de San Juan, both located on the San Juan Bay. The latter is the only inhabited islet with communities like Old San Juan and Puerta de Tierra, which are connected to the main island by bridges.

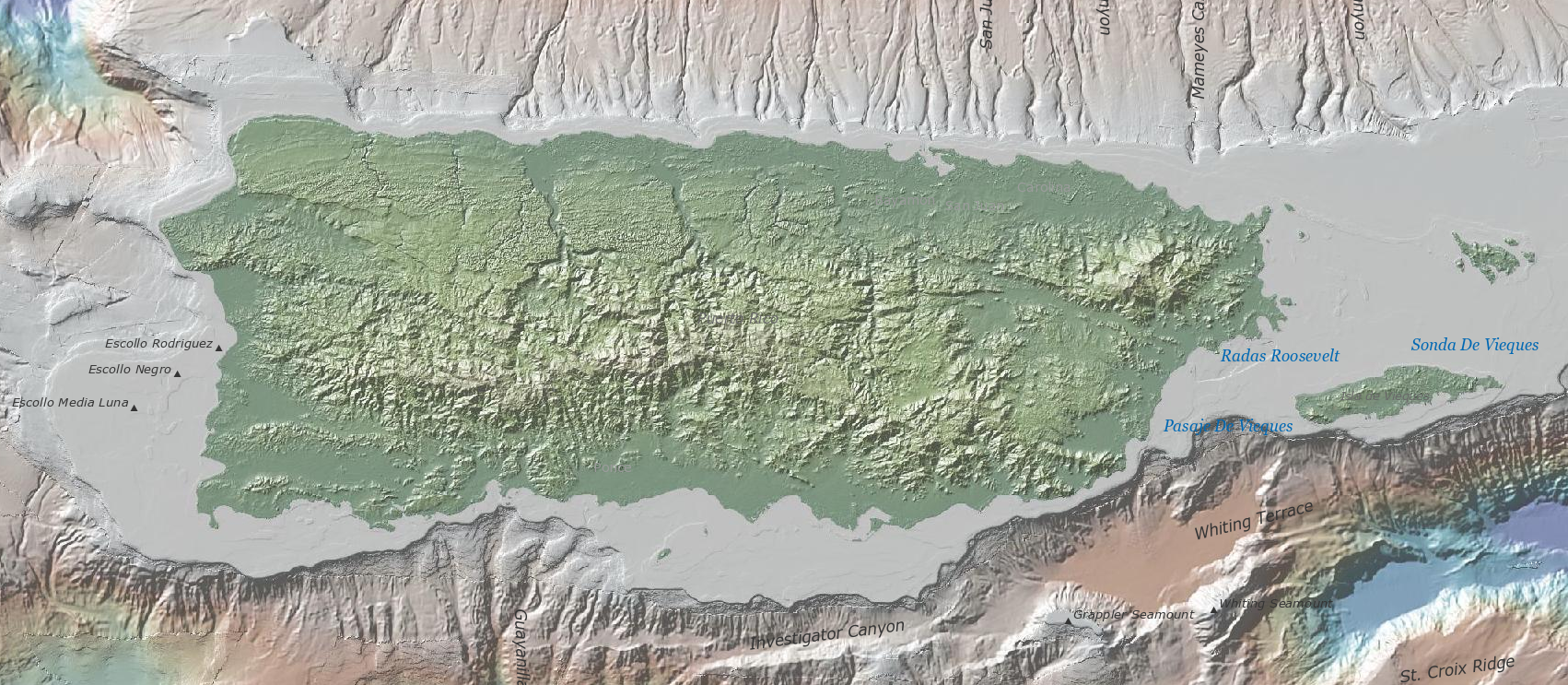
NOAA Bathymetry Image of Puerto Rico (2020)

The Commonwealth of Puerto Rico has an area of 3,515 square miles (9,100 km^{2}), of which 3,459 sq mi (8,960 km^{2}) is land and 56 sq mi (150 km^{2}) is water. The maximum length of the main island from east to west is 110 mi (180 km), and the maximum width from north to south is 40 mi (64 km). Puerto Rico is the smallest of the Greater Antilles.

The topography is mostly mountainous with large flat areas in the northern and southern coasts. The main mountain range that crosses the island from east to west is called the Cordillera Central. The highest elevation, Cerro de Punta 4,390 feet (1,340 m), is located in this range. Another important peak is El Yunque, one of the highest in the Sierra de Luquillo at the El Yunque National Forest, with an elevation of 3,494 ft (1,065 m).

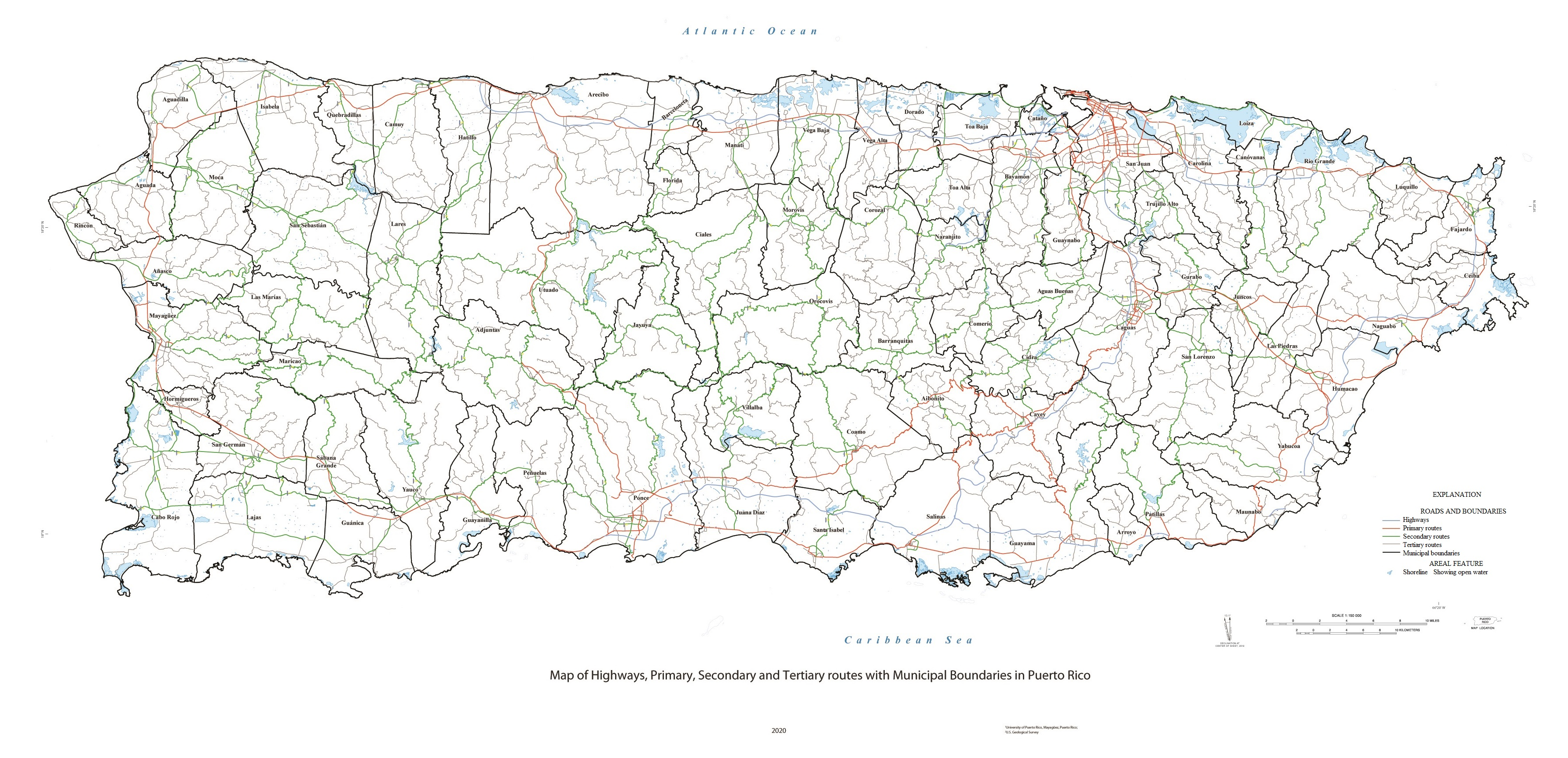
Map by USGS

Puerto Rico has 17 lakes, all man-made, and more than 50 rivers, most of which originate in the Cordillera Central. Rivers in the north are typically longer and of higher water flow rates than those of the south, since the south receives less rain than the central and northern regions.

Puerto Rico is composed of Cretaceous to Eocene volcanic and plutonic rocks, overlain by younger Oligocene and more recent carbonates and other sedimentary rocks. Most of the caverns and karst topography on the island occurs in the northern region. The oldest rocks are approximately 190 million years old (Jurassic) and are located at Sierra Bermeja in the southwest. They may represent part of the oceanic crust and are believed to come from the Pacific Ocean realm.

Puerto Rico lies at the boundary between the Caribbean and North American plates and is being deformed by the tectonic stresses caused by their interaction. These stresses may cause earthquakes and tsunamis. These seismic events, along with landslides, represent some of the most dangerous geologic hazards in the island and in the northeastern Caribbean. The 1918 San Fermín earthquake had an estimated magnitude of 7.5 on the Richter scale. It originated off the northern coast and was accompanied by a tsunami. It caused extensive property damage and widespread losses, damaging infrastructure, especially bridges. It resulted in an estimated 116 deaths and $4 million in property damage. The failure of the government to move rapidly to provide for the general welfare contributed to political activism by opponents and eventually to the rise of the Puerto Rican Nationalist Party. On January 7, 2020, the island experienced its largest earthquake since 1918, estimated at magnitude 6.4. Economic losses were estimated to be more than $3.1 billion.

The Puerto Rico Trench, the largest and deepest trench in the Atlantic, is located about 71 mi (114 km) north of Puerto Rico at the boundary between the Caribbean and North American plates. It is 170 mi (270 km) long. At its deepest point, named the Milwaukee Deep, it is almost 27,600 ft (8,400 m) deep. The Mona Canyon, located in the Mona Passage between Puerto Rico and the Dominican Republic, is another prominent oceanic landform with steep walls measuring between 1.25 and 2.17 miles (2.01 and 3.49 km) in height from bottom to top.

=== Climate ===
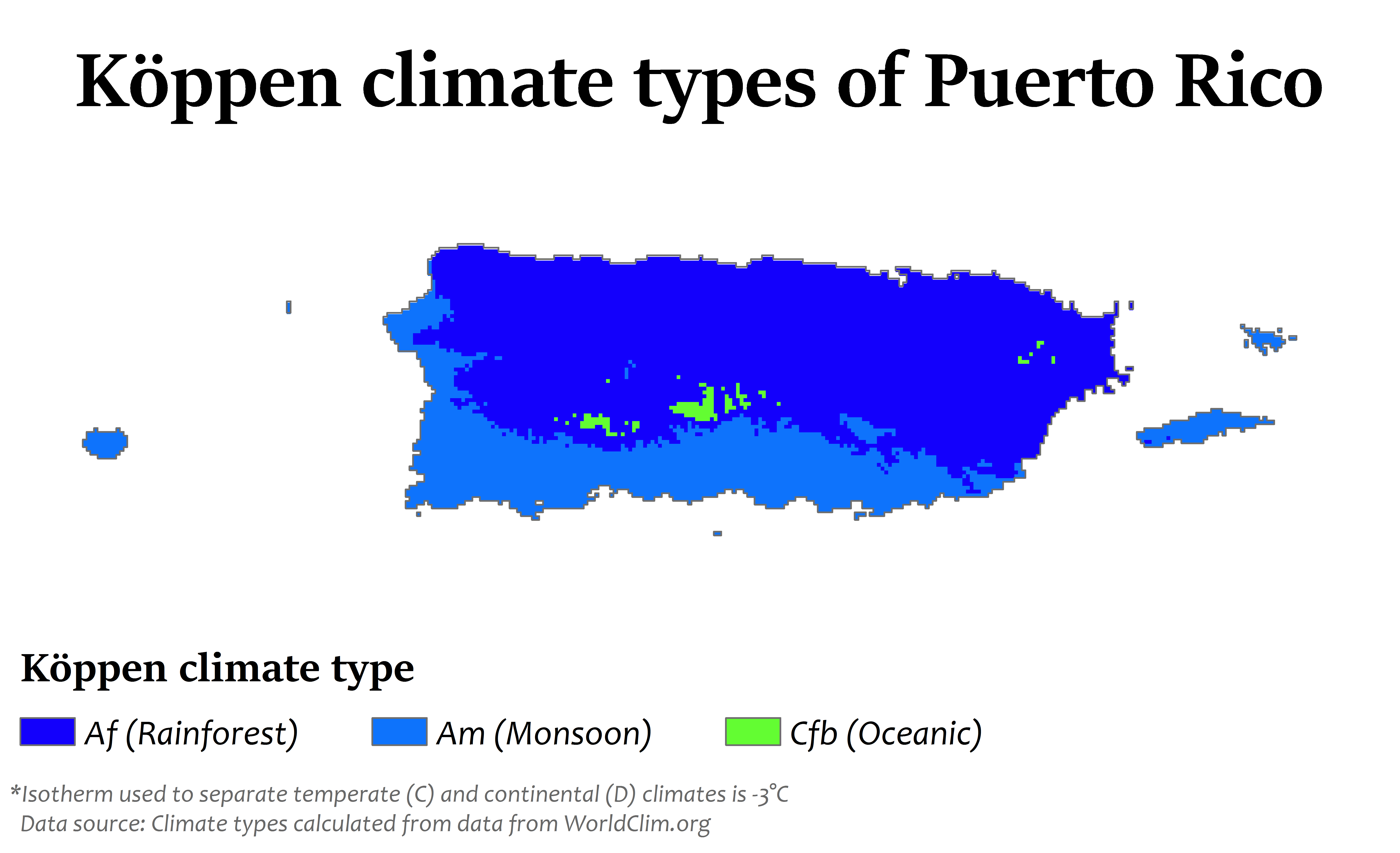
Köppen climate types in Puerto Rico indicating that the island primarily has rainforest and monsoon climate types

The climate of Puerto Rico in the Köppen climate classification is mostly tropical rainforest. Temperatures are warm to hot year round, averaging near 85 °F (29 °C) in lower elevations and 70 °F (21 °C) in the mountains. Easterly trade winds pass across the island year round. The wet season stretches from April into November, and the dry season occurs from December to March. The mountains of the Cordillera Central create a rain shadow and are the main cause of the variations in the temperature and rainfall that occur over very short distances. The mountains can also cause wide variation in local wind speed and direction due to their sheltering and channeling effects, adding to the climatic variation. Daily temperature changes seasonally are quite small in the lowlands and coastal areas.

Between the dry and wet seasons, there is a temperature change of around 6 °F (3.3 °C). This change is due mainly to the warm waters of the tropical Atlantic Ocean, which significantly modify cooler air moving in from the north and northwest. Coastal water temperatures during the year are about 75 °F (24 °C) in February and 85 °F (29 °C) in August. The highest recorded temperature was 110 °F (43 °C) at Arecibo, while the lowest temperature was 40 °F (4 °C) in the mountains at Adjuntas, Aibonito, and Corozal. The average yearly precipitation is 66 in (1,676 mm). Climate change in Puerto Rico has had a large impact on the ecosystems and landscapes.

Puerto Rico experiences the Atlantic hurricane season, similar to the rest of the Caribbean Sea and North Atlantic Ocean. On average, a quarter of its annual rainfall is contributed from tropical cyclones, which are more prevalent during periods of La Niña than El Niño. On average, a cyclone of tropical storm strength passes near Puerto Rico every five years, and a hurricane passes in its vicinity every seven years. Since 1851, the Lake Okeechobee Hurricane (also known as the San Felipe Segundo hurricane in Puerto Rico) of September 1928 is the only hurricane to make landfall as a Category 5 hurricane. In 2017, Puerto Rico was affected by Category 5 Hurricane Irma and Category 4 Hurricane Maria, causing widespread and devastating impacts, particularly to the electric grid.

=== Biodiversity ===
Puerto Rico is home to three terrestrial ecoregions: Puerto Rican moist forests, Puerto Rican dry forests, and Greater Antilles mangroves; two biosphere reserves are recognized by the UNESCO Man and the Biosphere Programme: Luquillo Biosphere Reserve represented by El Yunque National Forest and the Guánica Biosphere Reserve.

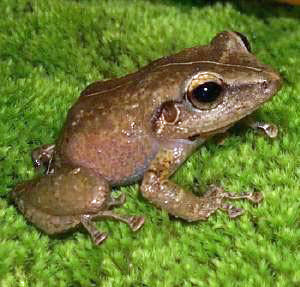
Common coquí

Endemic species include 239 plants, 16 birds, and 39 amphibians/reptiles. Most of these are found on the main island. The most recognizable endemic species and a symbol of Puerto Rican pride is the coquí, a small frog easily identified by the sound of its call, from which it gets its name. Most coquí species (13 of 17) live in the El Yunque National Forest, the only tropical rainforest in the U.S. Forest Service system, located in the northeast of the island. El Yunque is home to more than 240 plants, 26 of which are endemic to the island. It is also home to 50 bird species, including the critically endangered Puerto Rican amazon.

The moist forest ecoregion is represented by protected areas such as the Maricao and Toro Negro state forests. These areas are home to endangered endemic species such as the Puerto Rican boa (Chilabothrus inornatus), the Puerto Rican sharp-shinned hawk (Accipiter striatus venator), the Puerto Rican broad-winged hawk (Buteo platypterus brunnescens) and the elfin woods warbler (Setophaga angelae). The Northern Karst Belt is home to one of the remaining rainforest tracts in the island, with the Río Abajo State Forest being the first focus for the reintroduction of the highly endangered Puerto Rican amazon.

In the southwest, the Guánica State Forest and Biosphere Reserve contains over 600 uncommon species of plants and animals, including 48 endangered species and 16 endemic species, and is considered a prime example of the Puerto Rican dry forest ecoregion and the best-preserved dry forest in the Caribbean. Other protected dry forests can be formed within the Caribbean Islands National Wildlife Refuge complex at the Cabo Rojo, Desecheo, Culebra and Vieques National Wildlife Refuges, and in the Caja de Muertos and Mona and Monito Islands Nature Reserves. Examples of endemic species found in this ecoregion are the higo chumbo (Harrisia portoricensis), the Puerto Rican crested toad (Peltophryne lemur), and the Mona ground iguana (Cyclura stejnegeri), the largest land animal native to Puerto Rico.

Puerto Rico has three of the seven year-long bioluminescent bays in the Caribbean: Laguna Grande in Fajardo, La Parguera in Lajas and Puerto Mosquito in Vieques. These are unique bodies of water surrounded by mangroves that are inhabited by the dinoflagellate Pyrodinium bahamense. However, tourism, pollution, and hurricanes have highly threatened these unique ecosystems.

== Government and politics ==
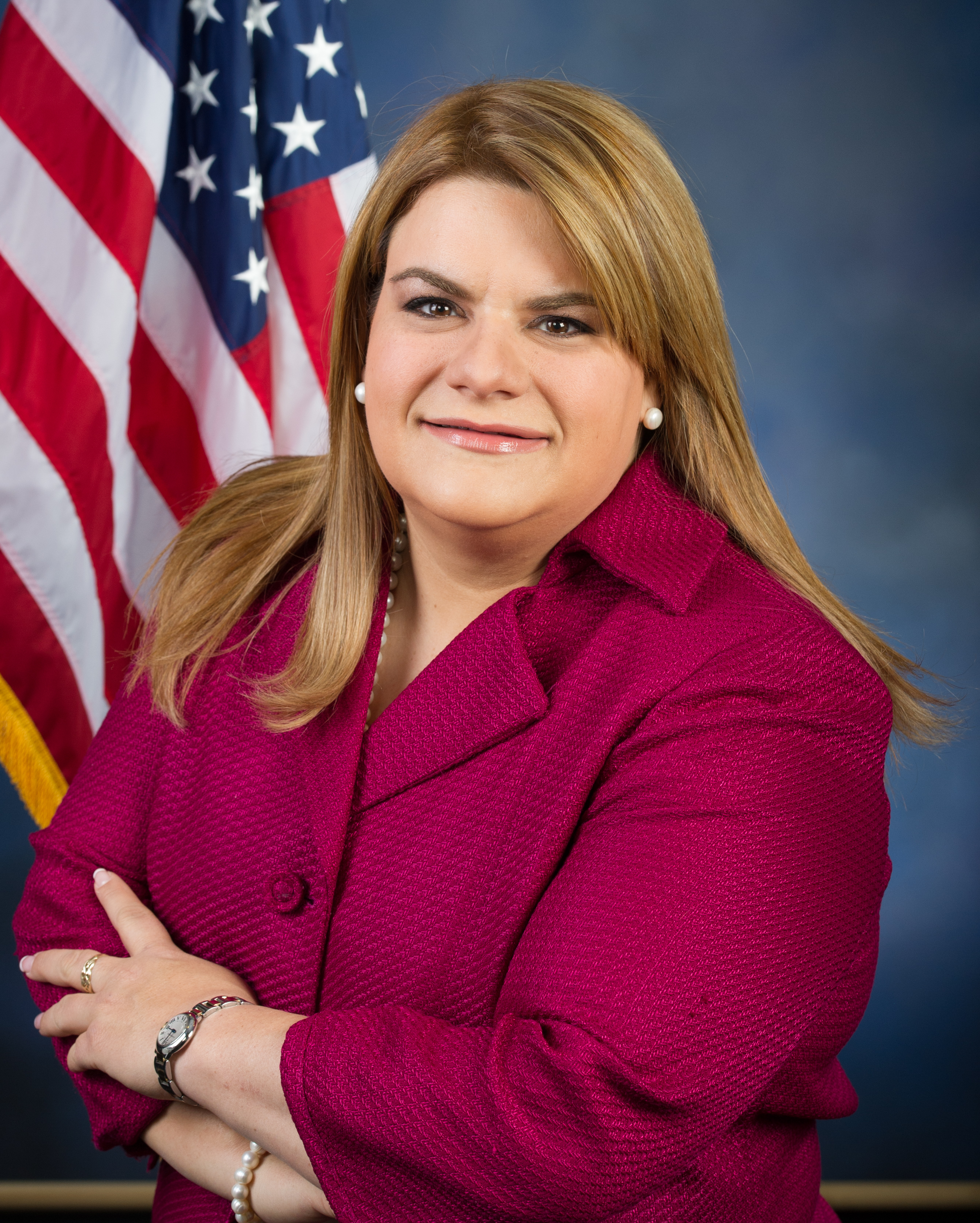
Jenniffer González-Colón
Governor

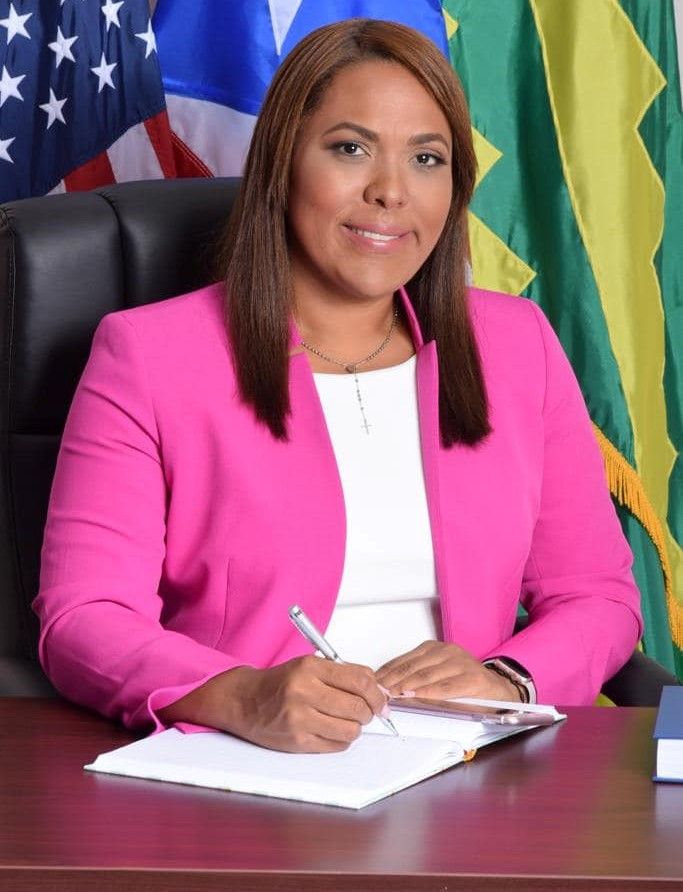
Rosachely Rivera
Secretary of State

Puerto Rico has a republican form of government based on the American model, with separation of powers subject to the jurisdiction and sovereignty of the United States. All governmental powers are delegated by the United States Congress, with the head of state being the President of the United States. As an unincorporated territory, Puerto Rico lacks full protection under the U.S. Constitution.

The government is composed of three branches. The executive is headed by the governor, currently Jenniffer González-Colón. The legislative branch consists of the bicameral Legislative Assembly, made up of a Senate as its upper chamber and a House of Representatives as its lower chamber; the Senate is headed by a president, currently Thomas Rivera Schatz, while the House is headed by the speaker of the House, currently Carlos "Johnny" Méndez. The governor and legislators are elected by popular vote every four years, with the last election held in November 2024. The judicial branch is headed by the chief justice of the Supreme Court of Puerto Rico, currently Maite Oronoz Rodríguez. Members of the judiciary are appointed by the governor with the advice and consent of the Senate.

Puerto Rico is represented in the U.S. Congress by a nonvoting delegate to the House of Representatives, the resident commissioner, currently Pablo Hernández Rivera. Current congressional rules have removed the commissioner's power to vote in the Committee of the Whole, but the commissioner can vote in committee.

Puerto Rican elections are governed by the Federal Election Commission and the State Elections Commission of Puerto Rico. Residents of Puerto Rico, including other U.S. citizens, cannot vote in U.S. presidential elections but can vote in primaries. Puerto Ricans who become residents of a U.S. state or Washington, D.C. can vote in presidential elections.

Puerto Rico has eight senatorial districts, 40 representative districts, and 78 municipalities; there are no first-order administrative divisions as defined by the U.S. government. Municipalities are subdivided into barrios. Each municipality has a mayor and a municipal legislature elected for a four-year term. The municipality of San Juan is the oldest, founded in 1521.

=== Political parties and elections ===
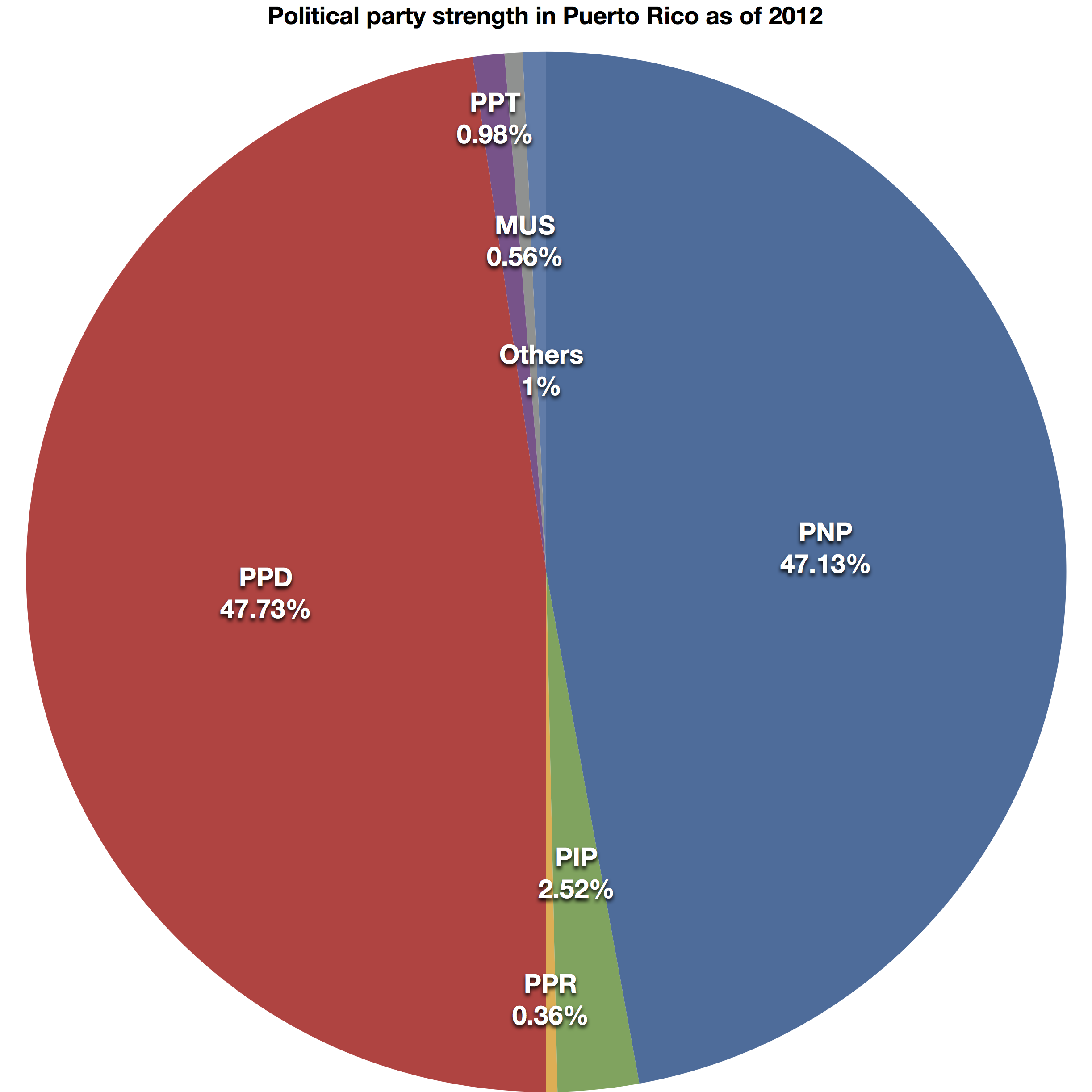
The difference between the incumbent party, the PPD, and its opponent, the PNP, was a mere 0.6% in the last election. This difference is common as the political landscape experiences political cycles between both parties, with the PPD ruling all branches of government for 36 of the past 64 years. The PNP, on the other hand, has ruled both the executive and legislative branch concurrently for 16 years. The other 12 years experienced a divided government.

Since 1952, Puerto Rico has had three main political parties: the Popular Democratic Party (PPD), the New Progressive Party (PNP) and the Puerto Rican Independence Party (PIP). The three parties stand for different political status. The PPD, for example, seeks to maintain the island's status with the U.S. as a commonwealth, while the PNP seeks to make Puerto Rico a U.S. state. Meanwhile, the PIP seeks to make Puerto Rico a sovereign nation free from U.S. authority. In terms of party strength, the PPD and PNP usually hold about 47% of the vote each while the PIP holds about 5%.

After 2007, other parties emerged on the island. The first, the Puerto Ricans for Puerto Rico Party was registered that same year. The party claims that it seeks to address the islands' problems from a status-neutral platform. But it ceased to remain as a registered party when it failed to obtain the required number of votes in the 2008 general election. Four years later, the 2012 election saw the emergence of the Movimiento Unión Soberanista (Sovereign Union Movement) and the Partido del Pueblo Trabajador (Working People's Party) but none obtained more than 1% of the vote. Other non-registered parties include the Puerto Rican Nationalist Party, the Socialist Workers Movement, and the Hostosian National Independence Movement.

=== Political status ===
The nature of Puerto Rico's political relationship with the U.S. is the subject of ongoing debate in Puerto Rico, the U.S. Congress, and the United Nations. Specifically, the basic question is whether Puerto Rico should remain an unincorporated territory of the U.S., become a U.S. state, or become an independent country.

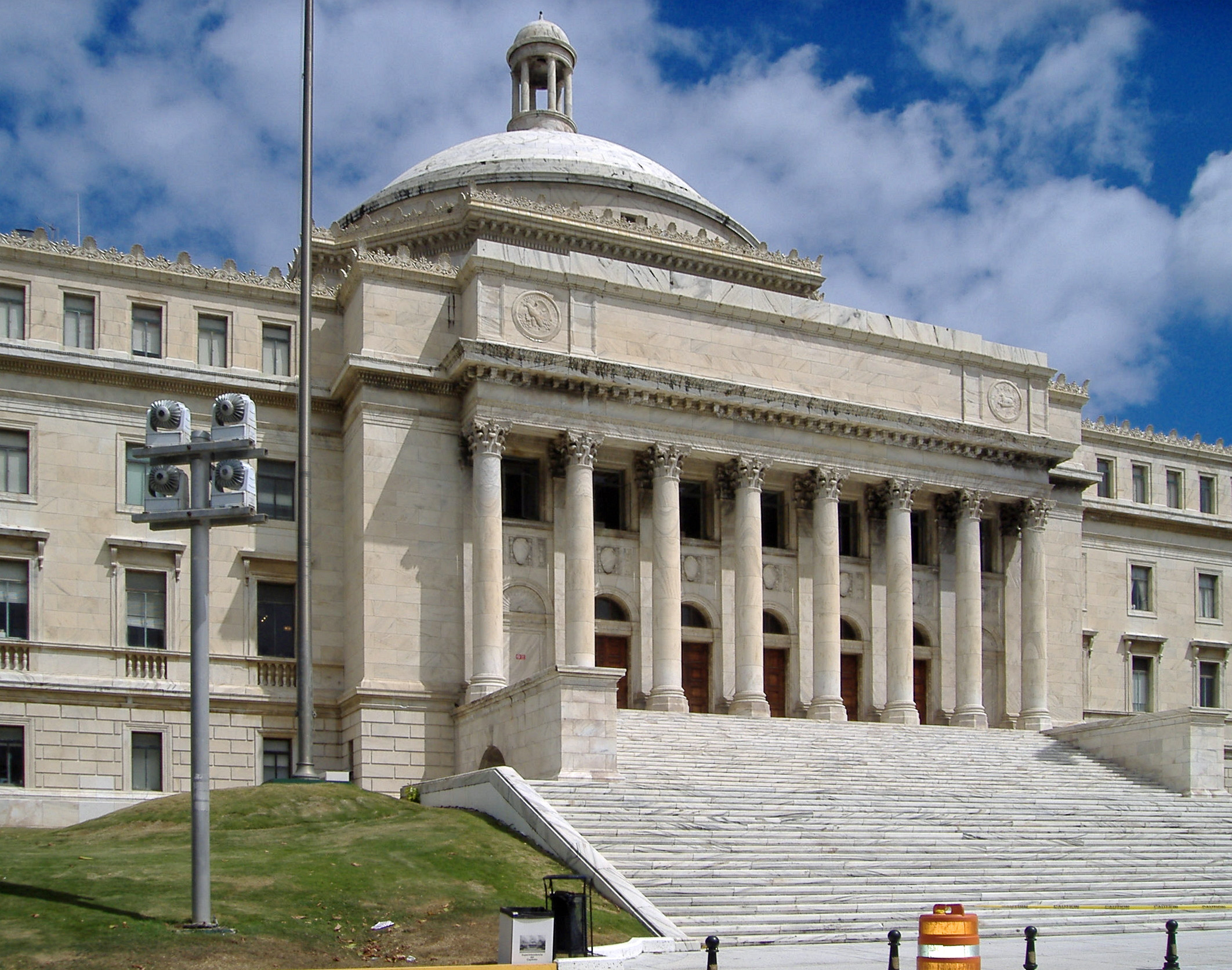
The Capitol of Puerto Rico, home of the Legislative Assembly in Puerto Rico

Constitutionally, Puerto Rico is subject to the plenary powers of the U.S. Congress under the territorial clause of Article IV of the U.S. Constitution. Laws enacted at the federal level in the U.S. apply to Puerto Rico as well, regardless of its political status. Their residents do not have voting representation in the U.S. Congress. Puerto Rico lacks "the full sovereignty of an independent nation", for example, the power to manage its "external relations with other nations", which is held by the U.S. federal government. The U.S. Supreme Court has indicated that once the U.S. Constitution has been extended to an area (by Congress or the courts), its coverage is irrevocable.

Puerto Ricans were collectively made U.S. citizens in 1917 as a result of the Jones–Shafroth Act. U.S. citizens residing in Puerto Rico cannot vote in U.S. presidential elections, though both major parties, Republican and Democratic, hold primary elections in Puerto Rico to choose delegates to vote on the parties' presidential candidates. Since Puerto Rico is an unincorporated territory and not a U.S. state, the U.S. Constitution does not fully enfranchise U.S. citizens residing in Puerto Rico. Fundamental rights under the constitution and adjudications are applied to Puerto Ricans. Various other U.S. Supreme Court decisions have held which rights apply in Puerto Rico and which ones do not. Puerto Ricans have a long history of service in the U.S. Armed Forces and have been included in the U.S. compulsory draft when it has been in effect.

Though the commonwealth government has its own tax laws, residents of Puerto Rico, contrary to a popular misconception, do pay U.S. federal taxes: customs taxes (which are subsequently returned to the Puerto Rico Treasury), import/export taxes, federal commodity taxes, social security taxes, etc. Residents pay federal payroll taxes, such as Social Security and Medicare, as well as Commonwealth of Puerto Rico income taxes. All federal employees, those who do business with the federal government, Puerto Rico-based corporations that intend to send funds to the U.S., and some others, such as Puerto Rican residents that are members of the U.S. military, and Puerto Rico residents who earned income from sources outside Puerto Rico also pay federal income taxes. In addition, because the cutoff point for income taxation is lower than that of the U.S. IRS code, and because the per-capita income in Puerto Rico is much lower than the average per-capita income on the mainland, more Puerto Rico residents pay income taxes to the local taxation authority than if the IRS code were applied to the island. This occurs because "the Commonwealth of Puerto Rico government has a wider set of responsibilities than do U.S. State and local governments."

In 2009, Puerto Rico paid $3.742 billion into the U.S. Treasury. Residents are eligible for Social Security benefits upon retirement. They are excluded from the Supplemental Security Income, and the island receives a smaller fraction of the Medicaid funding it would receive if it were a U.S. state. Also, Medicare providers receive less-than-full state-like reimbursements for services rendered to beneficiaries in Puerto Rico, even though the latter paid fully into the system.

The authority to enact a criminal code derives from Congress and not from local sovereignty as with the states. Thus, individuals committing a crime can only be tried in federal or territorial court, otherwise it would constitute double jeopardy and is constitutionally impermissible.

In 1992, President George H. W. Bush issued a memorandum to heads of executive departments and agencies establishing the current administrative relationship between the federal government and the Commonwealth of Puerto Rico. This memorandum directs all federal departments, agencies, and officials to treat Puerto Rico administratively as if it were a state, insofar as doing so would not disrupt federal programs or operations. Many federal executive branch agencies have significant presence in Puerto Rico, just as in any state, including the Federal Bureau of Investigation, Federal Emergency Management Agency, Transportation Security Administration, Social Security Administration, and others. While Puerto Rico has its own Commonwealth judicial system similar to that of a U.S. state, there is also a U.S. federal district court in Puerto Rico, and Puerto Ricans have served as judges in that court and in other federal courts regardless of their residency status at the time of their appointment. Sonia Sotomayor, a New Yorker of Puerto Rican descent, serves as an associate justice of the U.S. Supreme Court. Puerto Ricans have been appointed to high-level federal positions, including serving as U.S. ambassadors to other nations.

=== Administrative divisions ===
A map of Puerto Rico showing its 78 municipalities; the islands of Vieques and Culebra have their own municipal governments.

Unlike the vast majority of U.S. states, Puerto Rico has no first-order administrative divisions akin to counties but has 78 municipalities or municipios as the secondary unit of administration; for U.S. Census purposes, the municipalities are considered county equivalents. Municipalities are subdivided into barrios. Each municipality has a mayor and a municipal legislature elected for four-year terms, per the Autonomous Municipalities Act of 1991.

=== Foreign and intergovernmental relations ===
Puerto Rico is subject to the Commerce and Territorial Clause of the U.S. Constitution and is thus restricted on how it can engage with other nations, sharing the opportunities and limitations that state governments have albeit not being one. As is the case with state governments, it has established several trade agreements with other nations, particularly with Latin American countries such as Colombia and Panamá. It also established trade promotion offices in many foreign countries, all Spanish-speaking, and within the U.S. itself, including Spain, the Dominican Republic, Panama, Colombia, Washington, D.C., New York City and Florida. Such agreements require permission from the U.S. Department of State; most are simply allowed by existing laws or trade treaties between the U.S. and other nations which supersede trade agreements pursued by Puerto Rico and different U.S. states. Puerto Rico hosts consulates from 41 countries, mainly from the Americas and Europe, with most located in San Juan.

At the local level, Puerto Rico established by law that the international relations which states and territories are allowed to engage must be handled by the Department of State of Puerto Rico, an executive department, headed by the secretary of state of Puerto Rico, who also serves as the unincorporated territory's lieutenant governor. It is also charged to liaise with general consuls and honorary consuls based in Puerto Rico. The Puerto Rico Federal Affairs Administration, along with the Office of the Resident Commissioner, manages all its intergovernmental affairs before entities of or in the U.S. (including the federal government of the U.S., local and state governments of the U.S., and public or private entities in the U.S.). Both entities frequently assist the Department of State of Puerto Rico in engaging with Washington, D.C.-based ambassadors and federal agencies that handle Puerto Rico's foreign affairs, such as the U.S. Department of State, the Agency for International Development, and others. The current secretary of state is Rosachely Rivera from the New Progressive Party, while the current director of the Puerto Rico Federal Affairs Administration is Jennifer M. Stopiran also from the NPP and a member of the Republican Party of the U.S.

The resident commissioner of Puerto Rico, the delegate elected by Puerto Ricans to represent them before the federal government, including the U.S. Congress, sits in the U.S. House of Representatives, serves and votes on congressional committees, and functions in every respect as a legislator except being denied a vote on the final disposition of legislation on the House floor. The current resident commissioner is Jenniffer González-Colón, a member of the New Progressive Party and the Republican Party, elected in 2016. She received more votes than any other official elected in Puerto Rico that year.

Many Puerto Ricans have served as U.S. ambassadors to different nations and international organizations, such as the Organization of American States, mostly but not exclusively in Latin America. For example, Maricarmen Aponte, a Puerto Rican and now an acting assistant secretary of state, previously served as U.S. ambassador to El Salvador.

=== Military ===
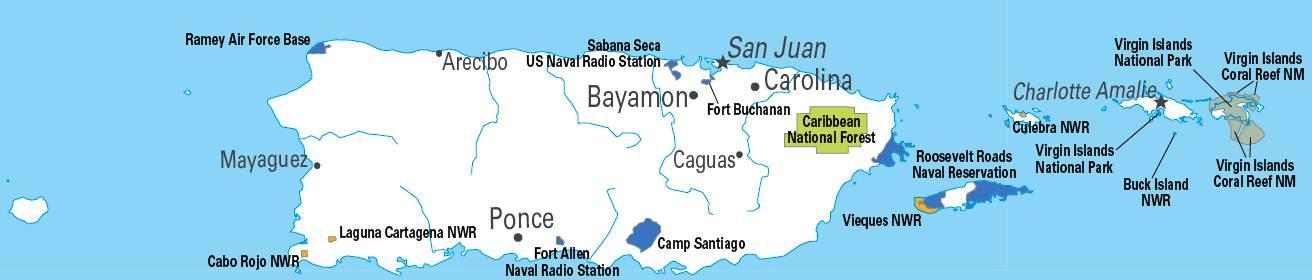
U.S. military installations and other federal lands in Puerto Rico (including the U.S. Virgin Islands) throughout the 20th century

The defense of Puerto Rico is provided by the U.S., under the responsibility of U.S. Northern Command. Puerto Rico has its own National Guard and its own state defense force, the Puerto Rico State Guard, which is under the authority of the Puerto Rico National Guard.

The commander-in-chief of both local forces is the governor of Puerto Rico who delegates his authority to the Puerto Rico adjutant general, currently Major General José J. Reyes. The adjutant general in turn delegates the authority over the state guard to another officer but retains the authority over the Puerto Rico National Guard as a whole.

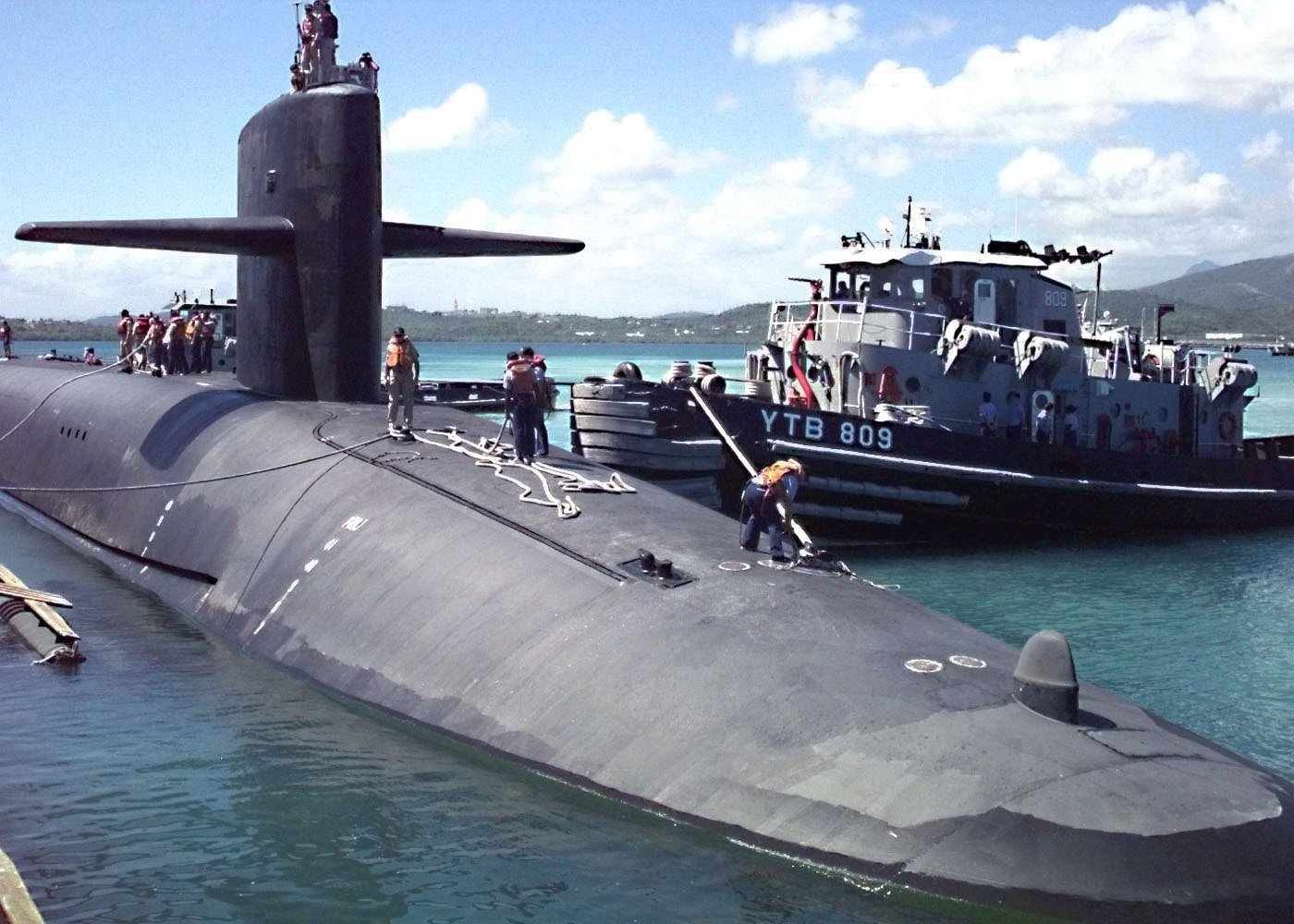
Ohio-class ballistic missile submarine USS Maryland, Roosevelt Roads Naval Station, 1997

Military presence includes the U.S. Navy at Roosevelt Roads Naval Station, U.S. Army at Fort Buchanan, the Puerto Rican Army and Air National Guards, and the U.S. Coast Guard. A branch of the U.S. Army National Guard is stationed in Puerto Rico – known as the Puerto Rico Army National Guard – which performs missions equivalent to those of the Army National Guards of U.S. states, including ground defense, disaster relief, and control of civil unrest. The local National Guard also incorporates a branch of the U.S. Air National Guard – known as the Puerto Rico Air National Guard.

At different times in the 20th century, the U.S. had about 25 military or naval installations in Puerto Rico. The former U.S. Navy facilities at Vieques and Sabana Seca have been deactivated and partially turned over to the local government. Puerto Ricans have participated in many U.S. military conflicts, including the American Revolution, when volunteers from Puerto Rico, Cuba, and Mexico fought the British in 1779 under the command of General Bernardo de Gálvez. They continue to be disproportionately represented in present-day conflicts. The most notable example is the 65th Infantry Regiment of the U.S. Army, nicknamed The Borinqueneers, from the original Taíno name of the island (Borinquen). The all-Puerto Rican regiment participated in World War I, World War II, the Korean War, and the war on terror; in 2014, it was awarded the Congressional Gold Medal for its heroism during the Korean War.

A significant number of Puerto Ricans serve in the U.S. Armed Forces, largely as National Guard members and civilian employees. The size of the overall military-related community is estimated to be 100,000, including retired personnel. Fort Buchanan has about 4,000 military and civilian personnel. In addition, approximately 17,000 people are members of the Puerto Rico Army and Air National Guards, or the U.S. Reserve forces.

=== Law ===
The insular legal system is a blend of civil law and the common law systems. Puerto Rico is the only U.S. jurisdiction whose legal system operates primarily in a language other than American English: namely, Spanish. Title 48 of the United States Code outlines the role of the U.S. Code to U.S. territories and insular areas such as Puerto Rico. After the U.S. government assumed control of Puerto Rico in 1901, it initiated legal reforms resulting in the adoption of codes of criminal law, criminal procedure, and civil procedure modeled after those then in effect in California. Although Puerto Rico has since followed the federal example of transferring criminal and civil procedure from statutory law to rules promulgated by the judiciary, several portions of its criminal law still reflect the influence of the California Penal Code.

The judicial branch is headed by the chief justice of the Puerto Rico Supreme Court, which is the only appellate court required by the Constitution. All other courts are created by the Legislative Assembly of Puerto Rico. There is also a Federal District Court for Puerto Rico, and someone accused of a criminal act at the federal level may not be accused for the same act in a Commonwealth court, and vice versa, since Puerto Rico as an unincorporated territory lacks sovereignty separate from Congress as a state does. The U.S. Supreme Court held in 2016 that such a parallel accusation would constitute double jeopardy.

==== Crime ====
The homicide rate of 19.2 per 100,000 inhabitants was significantly higher than any U.S. state in 2014. Most homicide victims are gang members and drug traffickers with about 80% of homicides in Puerto Rico being drug related.

In 1992, the FBI made armed carjacking a federal crime, and rates decreased per statistics, but as of 2019, the problem continued in municipalities like Guaynabo and others.

== Economy ==
Real GDP per capita development of Puerto Rico

Puerto Rico is classified as a high income economy by the World Bank and International Monetary Fund. It is considered the most competitive economy in Latin America by the World Economic Forum and ranks highly on the Human Development Index. According to World Bank, gross national income per capita in Puerto Rico in 2020 was $21,740. Puerto Rico's economy is mainly driven by manufacturing (primarily pharmaceuticals, textiles, petrochemicals and electronics) followed by services (primarily finance, insurance, real estate and tourism); agriculture represents less than 1% of GNP. (Note: pr.gov (in Spanish) "La manufactura es el sector principal de la economía de Puerto Rico.") (Note: pr.gov (in Spanish) "Algunas de las industrias más destacadas dentro del sector de la manufactura son: las farmacéuticas, los textiles, los petroquímicos, las computadoras, la electrónica y las compañías dedicadas a la manufactura de instrumentos médicos y científicos, entre otros.") In recent years, it has also become a popular destination for MICE (meetings, incentives, conferencing, exhibitions), with a modern convention center district overlooking the Port of San Juan.

Responsibility for San Juan port inspections lies with PPQ. So high is the volume of cargo traffic that between 1984–2000 the San Juan PPQ station recorded 7.74% of all interceptions, #4 in the country, #2 for insects and #3 for pathogens. Most species are originally from South America or elsewhere in the Caribbean due to Puerto Rico's position as an intermediary on the way to the mainland. This is one of the worst locations for cut flowers and other plant parts – both in terms of number of problems and diversity of species – for insects in plant parts in baggage, and for pathogens in plant parts in baggage and cargo. Pathogen interceptions were dramatically (17%) higher 1999–2000 than in 1985–1986.

Puerto Rico's geography and political status are both determining factors for its economic prosperity, primarily due to its relatively small size; lack of natural resources and subsequent dependence on imports; and vulnerability to U.S. foreign policy and trading restrictions, particularly concerning its shipping industry.

Puerto Rico experienced a recession from 2006 to 2011, interrupted by four quarters of economic growth, and entered into recession again in 2013, following growing fiscal imbalance and the expiration of the IRS Section 936 corporate incentives that the U.S. Internal Revenue Code had applied to Puerto Rico. This IRS section was critical to the economy, as it established tax exemptions for U.S. corporations that settled in Puerto Rico and allowed their insular subsidiaries to send their earnings to the parent corporation at any time, without paying federal tax on corporate income. Puerto Rico has been able to maintain relatively low inflation in the past decade while maintaining a GDP per capita (adjusted for purchasing power parity) higher than 80% of the rest of the world.

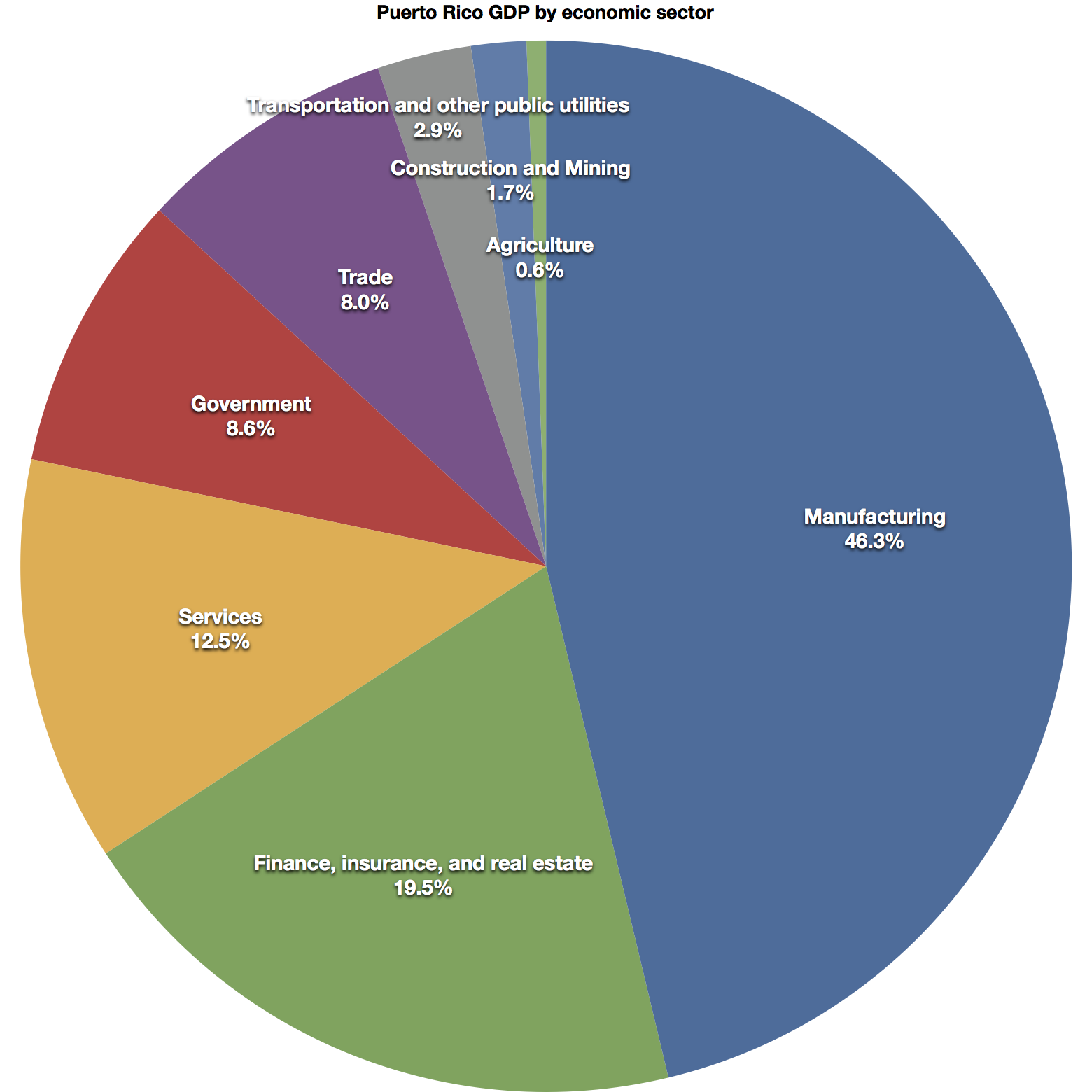
Puerto Rico's GDP by economic sector

Academically, most of its economic woes stem from federal regulations that expired, have been repealed, or no longer apply to Puerto Rico; its inability to become self-sufficient and self-sustainable throughout history; (Note: Torrech San Inocencio (2011; in Spanish) "Con los más de $1,500 millones anuales que recibimos en asistencia federal para alimentos podríamos desarrollar una industria alimentaria autosuficiente en Puerto Rico.") its highly politicized public policy which tends to change whenever a political party gains power; (Note: Millán Rodriguez (2013; in Spanish) "Los representantes del Pueblo en la Junta de Gobierno de la Autoridad de Energía Eléctrica [...] denunciaron ayer que la propuesta del Gobernador para hacer cambios en la composición del organismo institucionaliza la intervención político partidista en la corporación pública y la convierte en una agencia del Ejecutivo..") as well as its inefficient local government (Note: Vera Rosa (2013; in Spanish) "Aunque Puerto Rico mueve entre el sector público y privado $15 billones en el área de salud, las deficiencias en el sistema todavía no alcanzan un nivel de eficiencia óptimo.") (Note: Vera Rosado (2013; in Spanish) "Para mejorar la calidad de servicio, que se impacta principalmente por deficiencias administrativas y no por falta de dinero[...]") which has accrued a public debt equal to 68% of its gross domestic product throughout time. (Note: González (2012; in Spanish) "[...] al analizarse la deuda pública de la Isla contra el Producto Interno Bruto (PIB), se ubicaría en una relación deuda/PIB de 68% aproximadamente.") (Note: Bauzá (2013; in Spanish) "La realidad de nuestra situación económica y fiscal es resultado de años de falta de acción. Al Gobierno le faltó creatividad, innovación y rapidez en la creación de un nuevo modelo económico que sustentara nuestra economía. Tras la eliminación de la Sección 936, debimos ser proactivos, y no lo fuimos.")

By American standards, Puerto Rico is underdeveloped: It is poorer than Mississippi, the poorest state of the U.S., with 41% of its population below the poverty line. (Note: Quintero (2013; in Spanish) "Los indicadores de una economía débil son muchos, y la economía en Puerto Rico está sumamente debilitada, según lo evidencian la tasa de desempleo (13.5%), los altos niveles de pobreza (41.7%), los altos niveles de quiebra y la pérdida poblacional.") However, it has the highest GDP per capita in Latin America. Puerto Rico's main trading partners are the United States, Ireland, and Japan, with most products coming from East Asia, mainly China, Hong Kong, and Taiwan. Dependency on oil for transportation and electricity generation, as well as dependency on food imports and raw materials, makes Puerto Rico volatile and highly reactive to changes in the world economy.

=== Tourism ===
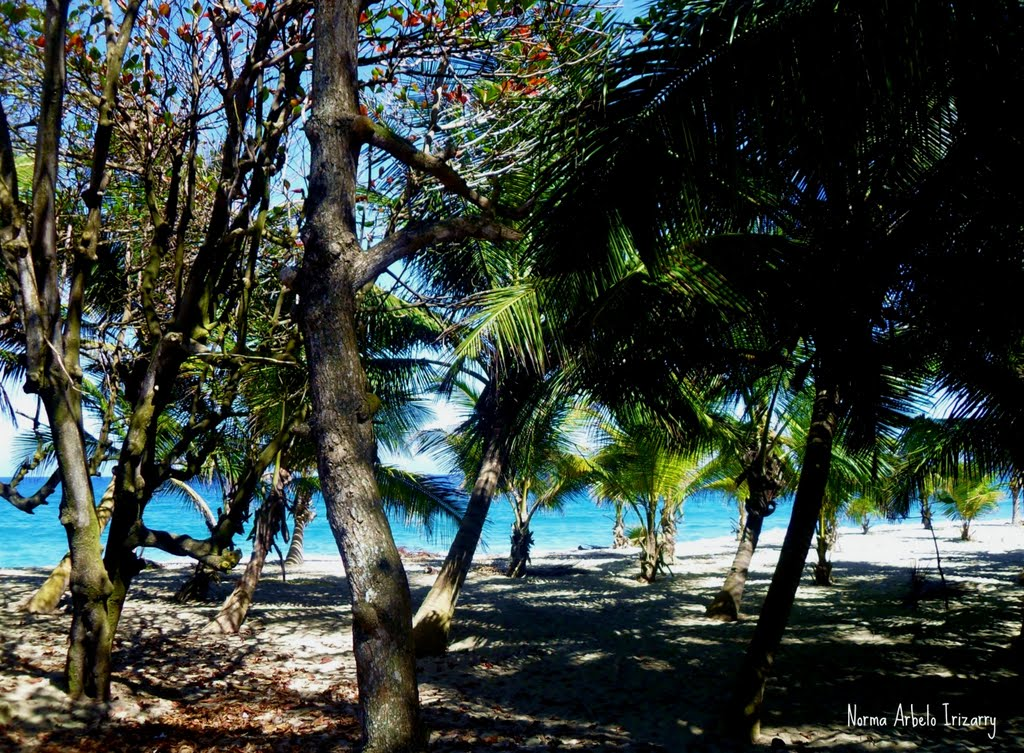
Beach in Coto, Isabela

In 2017, Hurricane Maria caused severe damage to the island and its infrastructure, disrupting tourism for many months. The damage was estimated at $100 billion. An April 2019 report indicated that by that time, only a few hotels were still closed, that life for tourists in and around the capital had, for the most part, returned to normal. By October 2019, nearly all of the popular amenities for tourists, in the major destinations such as San Juan, Ponce and Arecibo, were in operation on the island and tourism was rebounding. This was important for the economy, since tourism provides up to 10% of GDP, according to Discover Puerto Rico.

A tourism campaign was launched by Discover Puerto Rico in 2018 intended to highlight the culture and history, branding it distinct and different from other Caribbean destinations.

=== Pharmaceutical manufacturing ===
The pharmaceutical sector is a significant driver of the Puerto Rican economy. Puerto Rico boasts the second largest pharmaceutical manufacturing output in the United States, second to Indiana.

=== Fiscal debt ===
In early 2017, the Puerto Rican government-debt crisis posed serious problems for the government which was saddled with outstanding bond debt that had climbed to $70 billion. The debt had been increasing during a decade-long recession.

The Commonwealth had been defaulting on many debts, including bonds, since 2015. With debt payments due, the governor was facing the risk of a government shutdown and failure to fund the managed health care system. "Without action before April, Puerto Rico's ability to execute contracts for Fiscal Year 2018 with its managed care organizations will be threatened, thereby putting at risk beginning July 1, 2017 the health care of up to 900,000 impoverished U.S. citizens living in Puerto Rico", according to a letter sent to Congress by the Secretary of the Treasury and the Secretary of Health and Human Services. They also said that "Congress must enact measures recommended by both Republicans and Democrats that fix Puerto Rico's inequitable health care financing structure and promote sustained economic growth."

Initially, the oversight board created under PROMESA called for Governor Ricardo Rosselló to deliver a fiscal turnaround plan by January 28. Just before that deadline, the control board gave the Commonwealth government until February 28 to present a fiscal plan (including negotiations with creditors for restructuring debt) to solve the problems. A moratorium on lawsuits by debtors was extended to May 31. It is essential for Puerto Rico to reach restructuring deals to avoid a bankruptcy-like process under PROMESA. An internal survey conducted by the Puerto Rican Economists Association revealed that the majority of Puerto Rican economists reject the policy recommendations of the Board and the Rosselló government, with more than 80% of economists arguing in favor of auditing the debt.

In early August 2017, the island's financial oversight board (created by PROMESA) planned to institute two days off without pay per month for government employees, down from the original plan of four days per month; the latter had been expected to achieve $218 million in savings. Governor Rossello rejected this plan as unjustified and unnecessary. Pension reforms were also discussed including a proposal for a 10% reduction in benefits to begin addressing the $50 billion in unfunded pension liabilities.

=== Public finances ===
Puerto Rico has an operating budget of about U.S.$9.8 billion with expenses at about $10.4 billion, creating a structural deficit of $775 million (about 7.9% of the budget). The practice of approving budgets with a structural deficit has been done for 26 consecutive years starting in 2000. Throughout those years, including present time, all budgets contemplated issuing bonds to cover these projected deficits rather than making structural adjustments. This practice increased Puerto Rico's cumulative debt, as the government had already been issuing bonds to balance its actual budget for four decades beginning in 1973. (Note: Walsh (2013) "In each of the last six years, Puerto Rico sold hundreds of millions of dollars of new bonds just to meet payments on its older, outstanding bonds – a red flag. It also sold $2.5 billion worth of bonds to raise cash for its troubled pension system – a risky practice – and it sold still more long-term bonds to cover its yearly budget deficits.")

The 2012 budget of the government of Puerto Rico

Projected deficits added substantial burdens to an already indebted government which accrued a public debt of $71B or about 70% of Puerto Rico's gross domestic product. This sparked an ongoing government-debt crisis after Puerto Rico's general obligation bonds were downgraded to speculative non-investment grade ("junk status") by three credit-rating agencies. In terms of financial control, almost 9.6%—or about $1.5 billion—of Puerto Rico's central government budget expenses for FY2014 is expected to be spent on debt service. (Note: PRGDB "Financial Information and Operating Data Report to 18 October 2013" p. 142) Harsher budget cuts are expected as Puerto Rico must now repay larger chunks of debts in the coming years.

For practical reasons the budget is divided into two aspects: a "general budget" which comprises the assignments funded exclusively by the Department of Treasury of Puerto Rico, and the "consolidated budget" which comprises the assignments funded by the general budget, by Puerto Rico's government-owned corporations, by revenue expected from loans, by the sale of government bonds, by subsidies extended by the federal government of the United States, and by other funds.

Both budgets contrast each other drastically, with the consolidated budget being usually thrice the size of the general budget; currently $29B and $9.0B respectively. Almost one out of every four dollars in the consolidated budget comes from U.S. federal subsidies while government-owned corporations compose more than 31% of the consolidated budget.

The critical aspects come from the sale of bonds, which comprise 7% of the consolidated budget – a ratio that increased annually due to the government's inability to prepare a balanced budget in addition to being incapable of generating enough income to cover all its expenses. In particular, the government-owned corporations add a heavy burden to the overall budget and public debt, as none is self-sufficient. For example, in FY2011 the government-owned corporations reported aggregated losses of more than $1.3B with the Puerto Rico Highways and Transportation Authority reporting losses of $409M, the Puerto Rico Electric Power Authority reporting losses of $272M, while the Puerto Rico Aqueducts and Sewers Authority reported losses of $112M.

Losses by government-owned corporations have been defrayed through the issuance of bonds compounding more than 40% of Puerto Rico's entire public debt today. Holistically, from FY2000–FY2010 Puerto Rico's debt grew at a compound annual growth rate of 9% while GDP remained stagnant. This has not always provided a long-term solution. In early July 2017 for example, the PREPA power authority was effectively bankrupt after defaulting in a plan to restructure $9 billion in bond debt; the agency planned to seek Court protection.

=== Cost of living ===
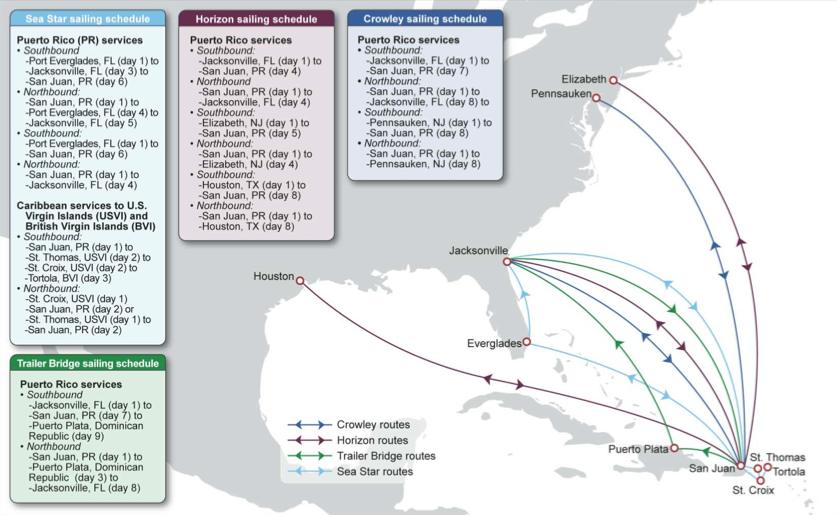
A map of the Jones Act merchant marine shipping routes for Puerto Rico

The cost of living in Puerto Rico is high compared to other non-US territories in the region. (Note: MRGI (2008) "Many female migrants leave their families behind due to the risk of illegal travel and the high cost of living in Puerto Rico.") Compared to the mainland US, overall cost of living is comparable or slightly lower outside of San Juan. Energy and food costs in particular are higher than US average Roughly 85% of groceries sold in Puerto Rico are imported. Cost of living has risen during the 21st century.

Statistics used for cost of living sometimes do not take into account certain costs, such as the high cost of electricity, which has hovered in the 24¢ to 30¢ range per kilowatt-hour, two to three times the national average, increased travel costs for longer flights, additional shipping fees, and the loss of promotional participation opportunities for customers "outside the continental United States". While some online stores do offer free shipping on orders to Puerto Rico, many merchants exclude the U.S. states of Hawaii and Alaska, and territories including Puerto Rico.

In 2024, the household median income was $27,213, compared to US median household income of $81,604. 37.3% of the population is below the national poverty line. In 2011, median home value in Puerto Rico ranged from U.S.$100,000 to U.S.$214,000, while the national median home value was $119,600. (Note: FRBNY (2011) "...home values vary considerably across municipios: for the metro area overall, the median value of owner-occupied homes was estimated at $126,000 (based on data for 2007–09), but these medians ranged from $214,000 in Guaynabo to around $100,000 in some of the outlying municipios. The median value in the San Juan municipio was estimated at $170,000.")

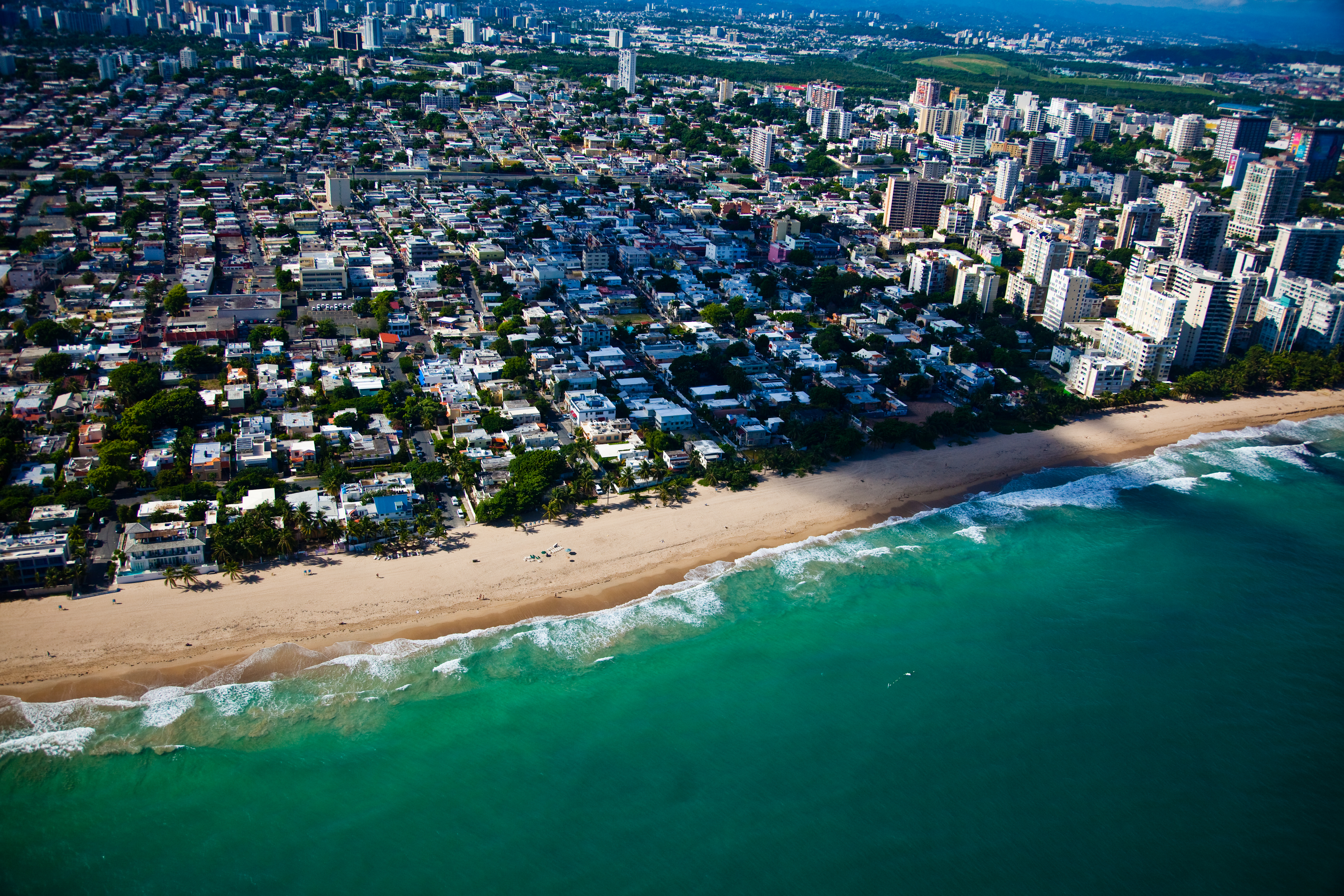
Flying into San Juan

The Merchant Marine Act of 1920 prevents foreign-flagged ships from carrying cargo between two American ports, a practice known as cabotage. Foreign ships inbound with goods from Central and South America, Western Europe, and Africa cannot stop in Puerto Rico, offload Puerto Rico-bound goods, load mainland-bound Puerto Rico-manufactured goods, and continue to U.S. ports. Instead, they must proceed directly to U.S. ports, where distributors break bulk and send Puerto Rico-bound manufactured goods to Puerto Rico across the ocean by U.S.-flagged ships. The local government has requested several times to the U.S. Congress to exclude Puerto Rico from the act restrictions without success. (Note: Santiago (2021) "Local detractors of the Jones Act [...] for many years have unsuccessfully tried to have Puerto Rico excluded from the law's provisions[...]")

In 2013 the Government Accountability Office published a report which concluded that "repealing or amending the cabotage law might cut Puerto Rico shipping costs" and that "shippers believed that opening the trade to non-U.S.-flag competition could lower costs". (Note: JOC (2013) "Repealing or amending the Jones Act cabotage law might cut Puerto Rico shipping costs") (Note: JOC (2013) "The GAO report said its interviews with shippers indicated they [...] believed that opening the trade to non-U.S.-flag competition could lower costs.") Ultimately, the report concluded that "[the] effects of modifying the application of the Jones Act for Puerto Rico are highly uncertain" for both Puerto Rico and the U.S., particularly for the U.S. shipping industry and the military preparedness of the U.S. A 2018 study by economists at Boston-based Reeve & Associates and Puerto Rico-based Estudios Tecnicos has concluded that the 1920 Jones Act has no impact on either retail prices or the cost of living on Puerto Rico.

=== Transportation ===
Puerto Rico interstate highways

Roads, freeways, expressways, and highways are maintained by the Highways and Transportation Authority under the jurisdiction of the U.S. Department of Transportation, and patrolled by the Puerto Rico Police Department. The San Juan metropolitan area is served by a public bus transit system and a metro system called Tren Urbano ('Urban Train'). Other public transport include seaborne ferries and carros públicos (private mini buses).

There are three international airports, the Luis Muñoz Marín International Airport in Carolina, Mercedita International Airport in Ponce, and the Rafael Hernández Airport in Aguadilla, and 27 local airports. The Luis Muñoz Marín International Airport is the largest aerial transportation hub in the Caribbean.

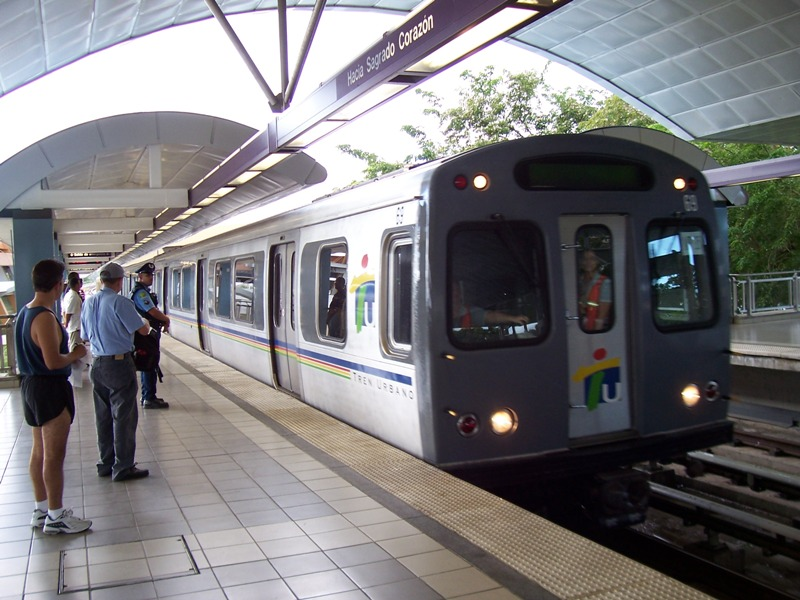
A Tren Urbano train at Bayamón Station

Puerto Rico has nine ports. The San Juan Port is the largest in Puerto Rico, and the busiest port in the Caribbean and the 10th busiest in the United States in terms of commercial activity and cargo movement, respectively. The second largest port is the Port of the Americas in Ponce, currently under expansion to increase cargo capacity to 1.5 million 20-foot containers (TEUs) per year.

=== Utilities ===
==== Electricity ====
The Puerto Rico Electric Power Authority (PREPA, Spanish: Autoridad de Energía Eléctrica, AEE)—is an electric power company and the government-owned corporation of Puerto Rico responsible for electricity generation, power transmission, and power distribution in Puerto Rico. PREPA was, by law, the only entity authorized to conduct such business in Puerto Rico, effectively making it a government monopoly until 2018. PREPA is ruled by a governing board appointed by the governor with the advice and consent of the Senate of Puerto Rico, and is run by an executive director.

On July 20, 2018, Puerto Rico Law 120-2018 (Ley para Transformar el Sistema Eléctrico de Puerto Rico) was signed. This law authorized PREPA to sell infrastructure and services to other providers. As a result, a contract was signed on June 22, 2020, making LUMA Energy the operator of the energy distribution and transmission infrastructure, as well as other areas of PREPA's operations, in effect partially privatizing the Puerto Rican power grid. The takeover was set for June 1, 2021, amidst protests and uncertainty from the point of view of the general public and the former-PREPA workers and union members.

==== Water and sewage ====
Similarly, the Puerto Rico Aqueducts and Sewers Authority (PRASA, Spanish: Autoridad de Acueductos y Alcantarillados, AAA)—is a water company and the government-owned corporation responsible for water quality, management, and supply. It is the only entity authorized to conduct such business in Puerto Rico, effectively making it a government monopoly. Its existence is designated by Law No. 40 of May 1, 1945, including the corresponding amendments.

=== Telecommunications ===
Telecommunications in Puerto Rico includes radio, television, fixed and mobile telephones, and the Internet. Broadcasting in Puerto Rico is regulated by the U.S. Federal Communications Commission (FCC). As of 2007, there were 30 TV stations, 125 radio stations and roughly 1 million TV sets on the island. Cable TV subscription services are available, and the U.S. Armed Forces Radio and Television Service also broadcast on the island. Puerto Rico also has its own amateur radio prefixes, which differ from those of the contiguous United States in that the second letter before the number is always P. The most well-known prefix is KP4, but others separated for use on the archipelago (including Desecheo and Mona) are: KP3/KP4/NP3/NP4/WP3/WP4 (Puerto Rico, Vieques and Culebra) and KP5/NP5/WP5 (Desecheo Island). Amateur radio operators (also known as ham radio operators) are a well-known group in the island and can obtain special vehicle license plates with their callsign on them. They have been a key element in disaster relief.

== Demographics ==
Historical population
Census	Pop.	Note	%±
1800	155,426		—
1860	583,308		—
1900	953,243		—
1910	1,118,012		17.3%
1920	1,299,809		16.3%
1930	1,543,913		18.8%
1940	1,869,255		21.1%
1950	2,210,703		18.3%
1960	2,349,544		6.3%
1970	2,712,033		15.4%
1980	3,196,520		17.9%
1990	3,522,037		10.2%
2000	3,808,610		8.1%
2010	3,725,789		−2.2%
2020	3,285,874		−11.8%
1765–2020 (*1899 shown as 1900)

The population of Puerto Rico reflects influences from initial Amerindian settlement, European colonization, slavery, economic migration, and the archipelago's status as unincorporated territory of the United States. Puerto Ricans are characterized by a high degree of ethnic and cultural diversity, as well as a long history of intermarriage and acculturation among different demographics; racial and ethnic identity is subsequently complex and often nebulous, shaped by the broader attitudes and policies of the Spanish colonial period, 20th century American racial politics, and modern trends in cultural and identity in the 21st century United States.

According to the most recent 2020 United States census, Puerto Rico had 3,285,874 residents, an 11.8% decrease since 2010. The commonwealth's population peaked in 2000, when it was 3,808,610, before declining (for the first time in census history) to 3,725,789 in 2010. Emigration due to economic difficulties and natural disasters, coupled with a low birth rate, have resulted in continued population decline into the 21st century.

=== Population distribution ===
The most populous municipality is San Juan with 342,259 people based on the 2020 Census. Other major cities include Bayamón, Carolina, Ponce, and Caguas. Of the ten most populous cities, eight are located within San Juan's metropolitan area, while the other two are located in the south (Ponce) and west (Mayagüez) of the island.

Largest cities or towns in Puerto Rico 2020 Census
Rank	Name	Metropolitan Statistical Area	Pop.
1	San Juan	San Juan-Caguas-Guaynabo	342,259
2	Bayamón	San Juan-Caguas-Guaynabo	185,187
3	Carolina	San Juan-Caguas-Guaynabo	154,815
4	Ponce	Ponce	137,491
5	Caguas	San Juan-Caguas-Guaynabo	127,244
6	Guaynabo	San Juan-Caguas-Guaynabo	89,780
7	Arecibo	San Juan-Caguas-Guaynabo	87,754
8	Toa Baja	San Juan-Caguas-Guaynabo	75,293
9	Mayagüez	Mayagüez	73,077
10	Trujillo Alto	San Juan-Caguas-Guaynabo	67,740

=== Population makeup ===
Racial groups in Puerto Rico (2020 census)
1. Mixed (49.8%)
2. Whites (17.1%)
3. Blacks (6.96%)
4. Indigenous (0.54%)
5. East Asians (0.12%)
6. Pacific Islanders (0.02%)
7. Others (25.5%)

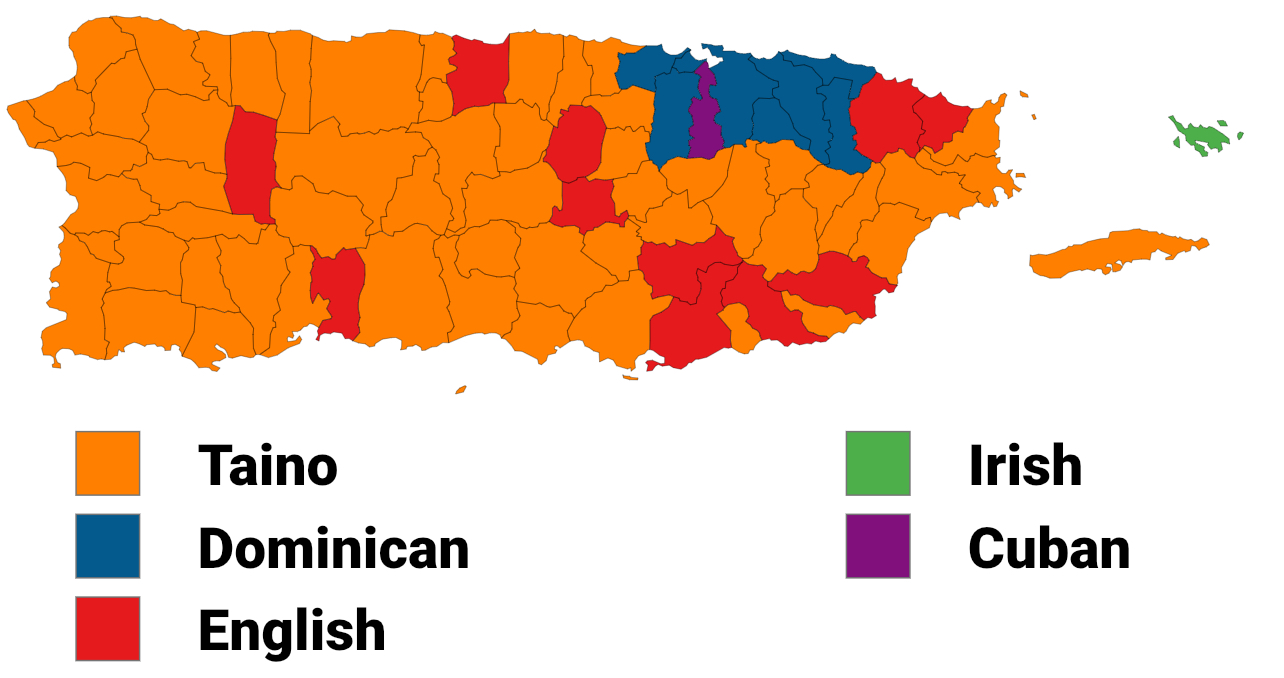
Largest ethnic minority in Puerto Rico by municipio, per the 2020 census

As of 2020, Hispanic or Latinos made up 98.9 percent of the population, of which 95.5 percent were Puerto Rican and 3.4% were Hispanic of non-Puerto Rican origins; 1.1 percent of the population was non-Hispanic. Fewer than one-fifth of people (17.1 percent) identified as "White", a decline of almost 80 percent; by contrast, nearly half of Puerto Ricans (49.8 percent) reported being multiracial—compared to just 3 percent in 2010—while roughly one-quarter chose "some other race alone" (25.5 percent).

Censuses of Puerto Rico were completed by Spain in the 18th and 19th century, yet some of the data remained untabulated and were considered reliable in a 1943 report by Irene Barnes Taeuber, an American demographer at the Office of Population Research at Princeton University. Continuous European immigration and high natural increase helped the population grow from 155,426 in 1800 to almost a million by the end of the 19th century. A census conducted in 1858 gave the following data: 341,015 were free colored; 300,430 were white; and 41,736 were slaves. A census in 1887 found a population of around 800,000, of which 320,000 were black.

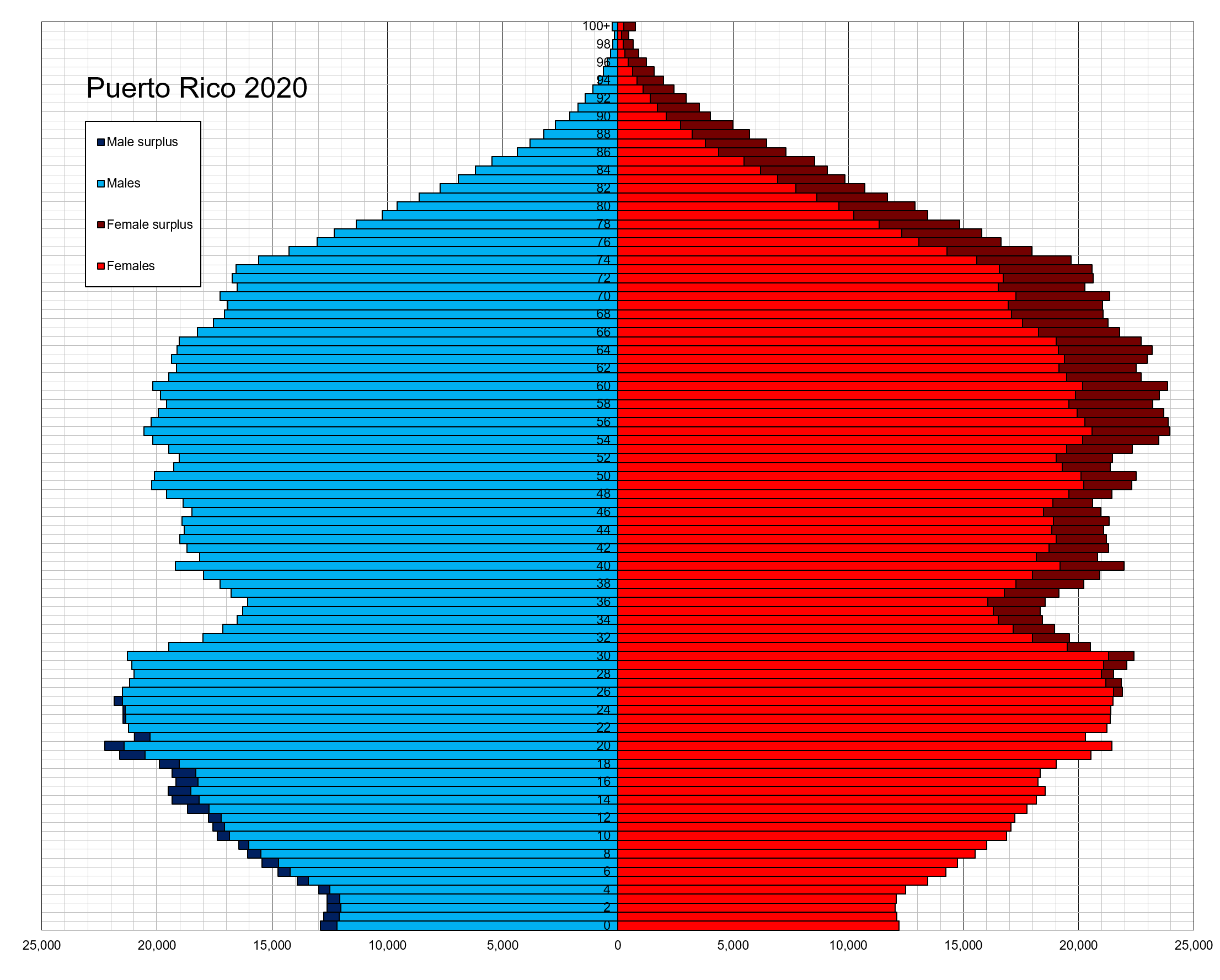
Population age pyramid of Puerto Rico in 2020

During the 19th century, hundreds of families arrived in Puerto Rico, primarily from the Canary Islands and Andalusia, but also from other parts of Spain such as Catalonia, Asturias, Galicia and the Balearic Islands; they were later joined by numerous Spanish loyalists from Spain's former colonies in South America. There were also smaller numbers of settlers from outside Spain, including from Corsica, France, Lebanon, Portugal, Ireland, Scotland, Germany and Italy; this immigration from non-Hispanic countries was largely the result of the Real Cédula de Gracias de 1815 (Royal Decree of Graces of 1815), which provided European Catholics with land allotments in the sparsely inhabited interior of the island, provided they paid taxes and continued to support the Catholic Church.

Between 1960 and 1990, the census questionnaire did not ask about race or ethnicity. The 2000 United States census included a racial self-identification question, according to which most Puerto Ricans identified as white and Latino, and few identified as black or some other race.

Although less than one percent of the population identifies as Indigenous, a large proportion of Puerto Ricans have Native ancestry: A 2003 study by the University of Puerto Rico, which took genetic samples from 800 randomly selected subjects throughout the island, found that 61.1 percent of those surveyed had mitochondrial DNA of Indigenous origin; additionally, 26.4 percent had African markers and 12.5 percent showed European descent. Researchers have attributed the predominance of Indigenous maternal lineages to the early colonial pattern of Spanish male settlers intermarrying with Taíno women. The study reportedly resulted in a resurgence of Indigenous and Taíno identity among Puerto Ricans; in the 2010 census, 19,839 respondents identified as "American Indian or Alaskan Native", an increase of almost 49 percent from 2000 count.

=== Immigration and emigration ===
Racial groups
Year	Population	White	Mixed (mainly biracial white European and black African)	Black	Asian	Other
2000	3,808,610	80.5% (3,064,862)	11.0% (418,426)	8.0% (302,933)	0.2% (7,960)	0.4% (14,429)
2010	3,725,789	75.8% (2,824,148)	11.1% (413,563)	12.4% (461,998)	0.2% (7,452)	0.6% (22,355)
2020	3,285,874	17.1% (560,592)	49.8% (1,636,365)	7.0% (230,011)	0.1% (3,285)	25.5% (837,897)

The vast majority of recent immigrants, both legal and illegal, come from Latin America, over half come from the Dominican Republic. Dominicans represent 53% of non-Puerto Rican Hispanics, about 1.8% of Puerto Rico's population. Some illegal immigrants, particularly from Haiti, Dominican Republic, and Cuba, use Puerto Rico as a temporary stop-over point to get to the U.S. mainland. Other major sources of recent immigrants include Cuba, Colombia, Mexico, Venezuela, Haiti, Honduras, Panama, Ecuador, Spain, and Jamaica. Additionally, there are many non-Puerto Rican U.S. citizens settling in Puerto Rico from the U.S., a majority of which are White Americans and a smaller number are Black Americans. In fact, non-Hispanic people represent 1.1%, and the majority of them are from the U.S. Smaller numbers of U.S. citizens come from the U.S. Virgin Islands. There are also large numbers of Nuyoricans and other stateside Puerto Ricans coming back, as many Puerto Ricans engage in 'circular migration'. Small numbers of non-Puerto Rican Hispanics in Puerto Rico are actually American-born migrants and not recent immigrants. Most recent immigrants settle in and around the San Juan metropolitan area.

Emigration is a major part of contemporary Puerto Rican history. Starting soon after World War II, poverty, cheap airfares, and promotion by the island government caused waves of Puerto Ricans to move to the U.S. mainland, particularly to the northeastern states and nearby Florida. This trend continued even as Puerto Rico's economy improved and its birth rate declined. Puerto Ricans continue to follow a pattern of circular migration, with some migrants returning to the island. In recent years, the population has declined markedly, falling nearly 1% in 2012 and an additional 1% (36,000 people) in 2013 due to a falling birthrate and emigration. The impacts of hurricanes Maria and Irma in 2017, combined with the unincorporated territory's worsening economy, led to its greatest population decline since the U.S. acquired the archipelago.

According to the 2020 U.S. census, the number of Puerto Ricans living outside of Puerto Rico in the U.S. is almost twice as many as those living in Puerto Rico. As those who leave tend to be better educated than those who remain, this accentuates the drain on Puerto Rico's economy.

=== Languages ===
The official languages of the government are Spanish and English. In 2015, the legislature declared Spanish to be the first official language and English the second official language. Spanish is, and has been, the only official language of the entire commonwealth judiciary system, despite a 1902 English-only language law. However, all official business of the U.S. District Court for the District of Puerto Rico is conducted in English. English is the primary language of less than 10% of the population. Spanish is the dominant language of business, education and daily life on the island, spoken by nearly 95% of the population.

Out of people aged five and older, 94.3% speak only Spanish at home, 5.5% speak English, and 0.2% speak other languages. A Pew Research survey indicated an adult literacy rate of 90.4% in 2012 based on data from the United Nations. Public school instruction is conducted almost entirely in Spanish. There have been pilot programs in about a dozen of the over 1,400 public schools aimed at conducting instruction in English only. Objections from teaching staff are common, perhaps because many of them are not fully fluent in English. English is taught as a second language and is a compulsory subject from elementary levels to high school. The languages of the deaf community are American Sign Language and its local variant, Puerto Rican Sign Language.

The Spanish language of Puerto Rico has evolved into a variety with many idiosyncrasies in vocabulary and syntax that differentiate it from Spanish spoken elsewhere. Puerto Rican Spanish utilizes many Taíno words as well as English words. The largest influence on the Spanish spoken in Puerto Rico is that of the Canary Islands. Taíno loanwords are most often used in the context of vegetation, natural phenomena, and native musical instruments. Similarly, words attributed to primarily West African languages were adopted in the contexts of foods, music, and dances, particularly in coastal towns with concentrations of descendants of sub-Saharan Africans.

=== Religion ===
Religious affiliation in Puerto Rico (2014)
1. Catholicism (56.0%)
2. Protestantism (33.0%)
3. Other (3.00%)
4. Irreligious (8.00%)

Christianity is the dominant religion. Catholicism was brought by Spanish colonists and gradually became the prevailing faith. The first dioceses in the Americas, including that of Puerto Rico, were authorized by Pope Julius II in 1511. In 1512, priests were established for the parochial churches. By 1759, there was a priest for each church. Pope John Paul II visited Puerto Rico in 1984. All municipalities in Puerto Rico have at least one Catholic church, most of which are located at the town center, or plaza.

Protestantism, which was suppressed under the Spanish Catholic regime, reemerged under U.S. rule, making contemporary Puerto Rico more interconfessional than in previous centuries, although Catholicism continues to be the dominant religion. The first Protestant church, Iglesia de la Santísima Trinidad, was established in Ponce by the Anglican Diocese of Antigua in 1872. It was the first non-Catholic church in the entire Spanish Empire in the Americas.

Sources differ on the denominational breakdown of the population. Pollster Pablo Ramos stated in 1998 that the population was 38% Catholic, 28% Pentecostal, and 18% independent churches; the total number of Protestants collectively added up to almost two million people, or 46% of the population. Another researcher gave a more conservative assessment of the proportion of Protestants in 1997, finding a Protestant population of 33–38%, the majority of whom are Pentecostal; the report estimated that Puerto Rico would become 75% evangelical by 2022.

A 2014 Pew Research report found that 56% of Puerto Ricans were Catholic, while 33% were Protestant and 8% were unaffiliated; these figures are shared by the CIA World Factbook, which further notes that Protestants are "largely Pentecostal", while other religions make up 2% and atheists 1%. Pew Research from the year before, which surveyed Puerto Ricans living in the mainland United States, found that about 45% of Puerto Rican adults identified themselves as Catholic, 29% as Protestant and 20% as unaffiliated with a religion. By contrast, an Associated Press article in March 2014 stated that "more than 70 percent" of Puerto Ricans identified as Catholic.

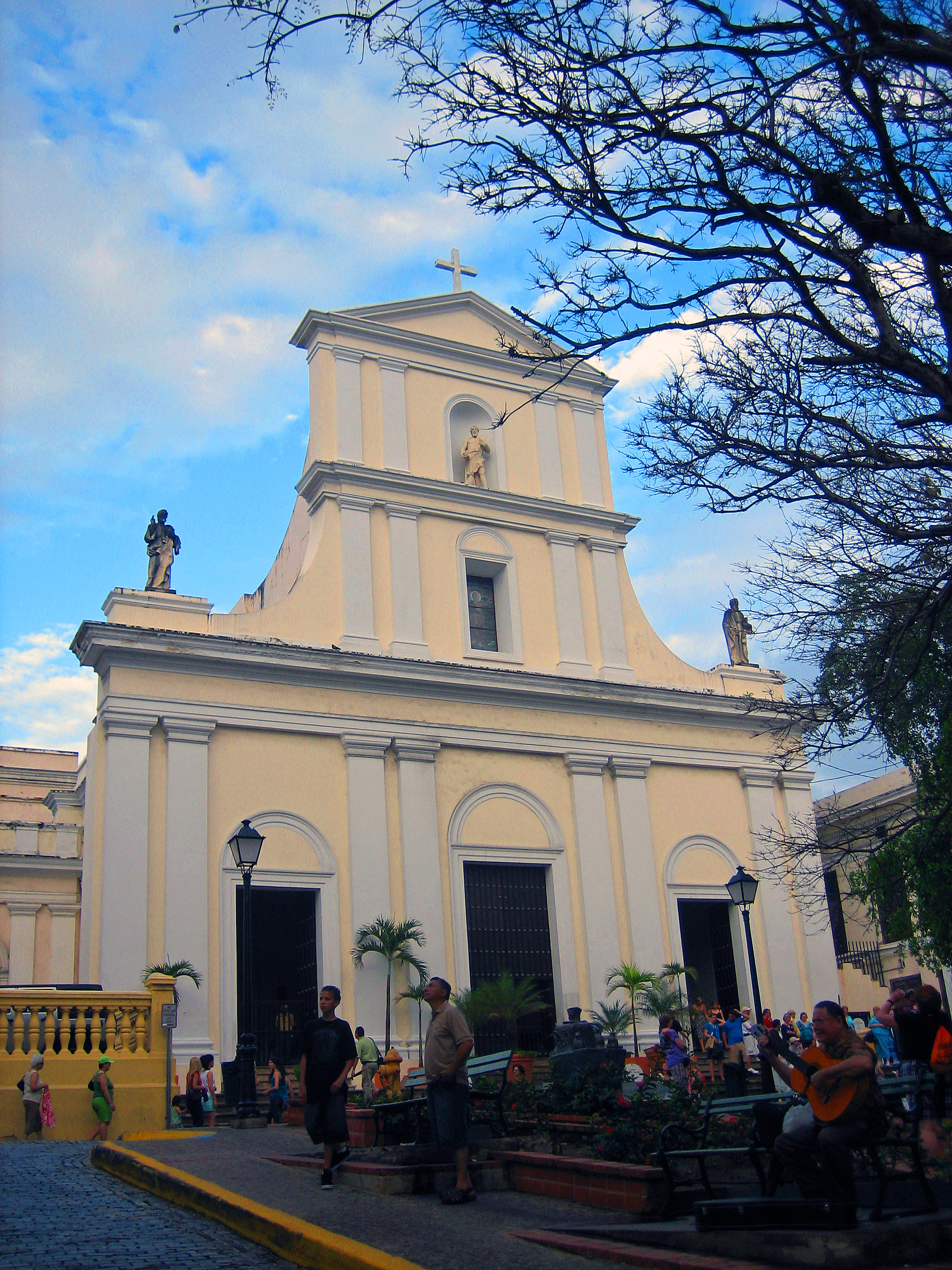
Cathedral of San Juan, built between 1535 and 1802

There is a small Eastern Orthodox community, centered mostly around two churches in the territory: the Russian Orthodox mission of Saint John Climacus in San German and the Saint George Antiochian Orthodox Church in Carolina; both have services in English and Spanish. There is a Syriac Orthodox church in Aguada and an Ethiopian Orthodox Tewahedo Church in Utuado, which represent the only Oriental Orthodox churches on the island. The Roman Catholic Church has a Greek Catholic Church in Trujillo Alto as well. Orthodox Christians accounted for one percent of the population in 2010. In 2017, the first Eastern Catholic Church was established in Puerto Rico.

In 2023, the Church of Jesus Christ of Latter-day Saints dedicated a temple in San Juan, and reported having a membership of approximately 23,000 in the commonwealth. In 2015, the 25,832 Jehovah's Witnesses represented about 0.70% of the population, with 324 congregations. Puerto Rico has the largest Jewish community in the Caribbean, at roughly 3,000, and is the only Caribbean island where Conservative, Reform and Orthodox Jewish movements are all represented. The first synagogue, Sha'are Zedeck, was established in 1952 by American Jews.

In 2007, there were about 5,000 Muslims, representing about 0.13% of the population. Eight mosques are located throughout the island, with most Muslims living in Río Piedras and Caguas; most Muslims are of Palestinian and Jordanian descent. There is also a Baháʼí community. Buddhism is represented with Nichiren, Zen and Tibetan Buddhism, with the New York Padmasambhava Buddhist Center for example having a branch in San Juan. There are several atheist activist and educational organizations, and an atheistic parody religion called the Pastafarian Church of Puerto Rico. An ISKCON temple in Gurabo is devoted to Krishna, with two preaching centers in the San Juan metropolitan area.

Taíno religious practices have been rediscovered and reinvented to some degree by a handful of advocates. Similarly, some aspects of African religious traditions have persisted, as African slaves maintained various ethnic African religious practices associated with different peoples; in particular, the Yoruba beliefs of Santería or Ifá, and the Kongo-derived Palo Mayombe. Some Indigenous and African practices and beliefs are syncretized with Christianity. In 1940, Juanita García Peraza founded the Mita Congregation, the first religion of Puerto Rican origin.

=== Education ===
Education in Puerto Rico is divided in three levels—primary (elementary school grades 1–6), secondary (intermediate and high school grades 7–12), and higher level (undergraduate and graduate studies). As of 2002, the literacy rate was 94.1%. According to the 2000 Census, 60.0% of the population attained a high school degree or higher level of education, and 18.3% has a bachelor's degree or higher. Instruction at the primary school level is compulsory between the ages of 5 and 18. As of 2010, there are 1,539 public schools and 806 private schools.

The first school was the Escuela de Gramática (Grammar School). It was established by Bishop Alonso Manso in 1513, in the area where the Cathedral of San Juan was to be constructed. The school was free of charge and the courses taught were Latin language, literature, history, science, art, philosophy and theology.

The largest and oldest university system is the public University of Puerto Rico with 11 campuses. The largest private university systems are the Sistema Universitario Ana G. Mendez which operates the Universidad del Turabo, Metropolitan University and Universidad del Este. Other private universities include the multi-campus Inter American University, the Pontifical Catholic University, Universidad Politécnica de Puerto Rico, and the Universidad del Sagrado Corazón. Puerto Rico has four schools of medicine and three ABA-approved law schools.

=== Health ===
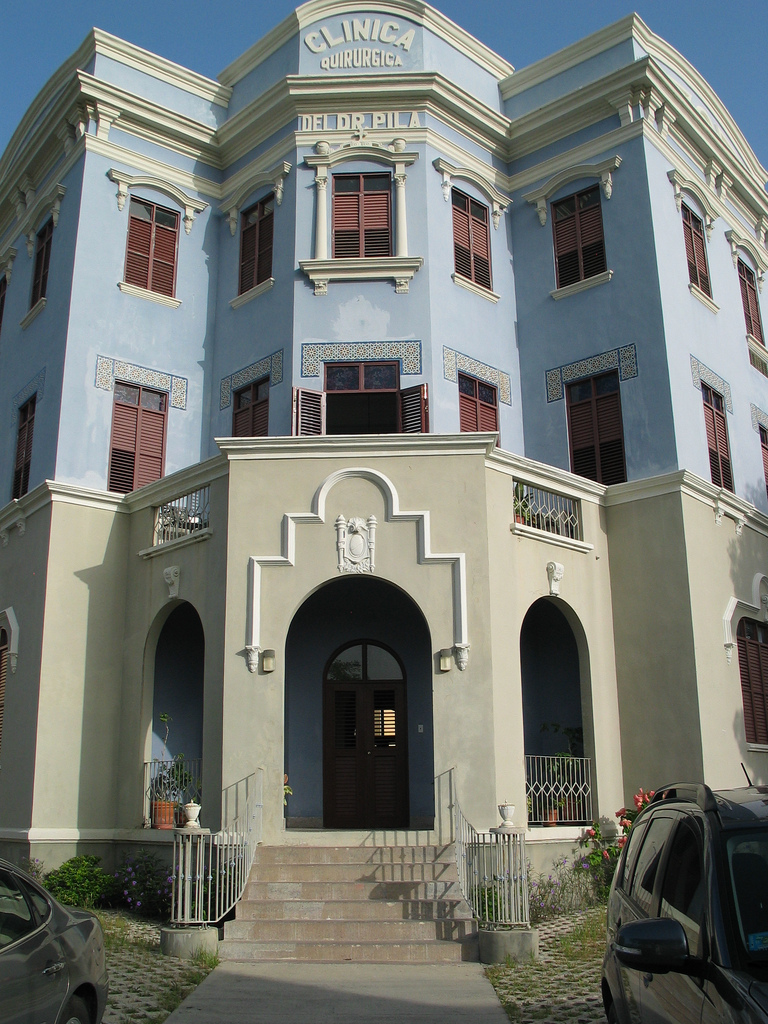
Old Hospital Doctor Pila in Barrio Primero, Ponce city

In 2017, there were 69 hospitals. As of 2021, average life expectancy is approximately 82.1 years according to the CIA World Factbook, an improvement from 78.7 years in 2010.

Reforma de Salud de Puerto Rico (Puerto Rico Health Reform) – locally referred to as La Reforma ('The Reform') – is a government-run program which provides medical and health care services to the indigent and impoverished, by means of contracting private health insurance companies, rather than employing government-owned hospitals and emergency centers. The Reform is administered by the Puerto Rico Health Insurance Administration.

== Culture ==
Modern Puerto Rican culture is a unique mix of cultural antecedents: including European (predominantly Spanish, Italian, French, German and Irish), African, and, more recently, some North American and many South Americans. Many Cubans and Dominicans have relocated to the island in the past few decades.

From the Spanish, Puerto Rico received the Spanish language, the Catholic religion, and the vast majority of their cultural and moral values and traditions. The United States added English-language influence, the university system, and the adoption of some holidays and practices. Much of the culture centers on the influence of music and has been shaped by other cultures combining with local and traditional rhythms. Early in the history of Puerto Rican music, the influences of Spanish and African traditions were most noticeable. The cultural movements across the Caribbean and North America have played a vital role in the more recent musical influences which have reached Puerto Rico.

Puerto Rico has many symbols, but only the Flor de Maga has been made official. Other popular, traditional, or unofficial symbols of Puerto Rico are the Puerto Rican spindalis, the kapok tree, the coquí frog, the jíbaro, the Taíno Indian, and Cerro Las Tetas with its jíbaro culture monument.

=== Architecture ===
The architecture of Puerto Rico demonstrates a broad variety of traditions, styles and national influences accumulated over four centuries of Spanish rule, and a century of American rule. Spanish colonial architecture, Ibero-Islamic, art deco, post-modern, and many other architectural forms are visible throughout the island. From town to town, there are also many regional distinctions.

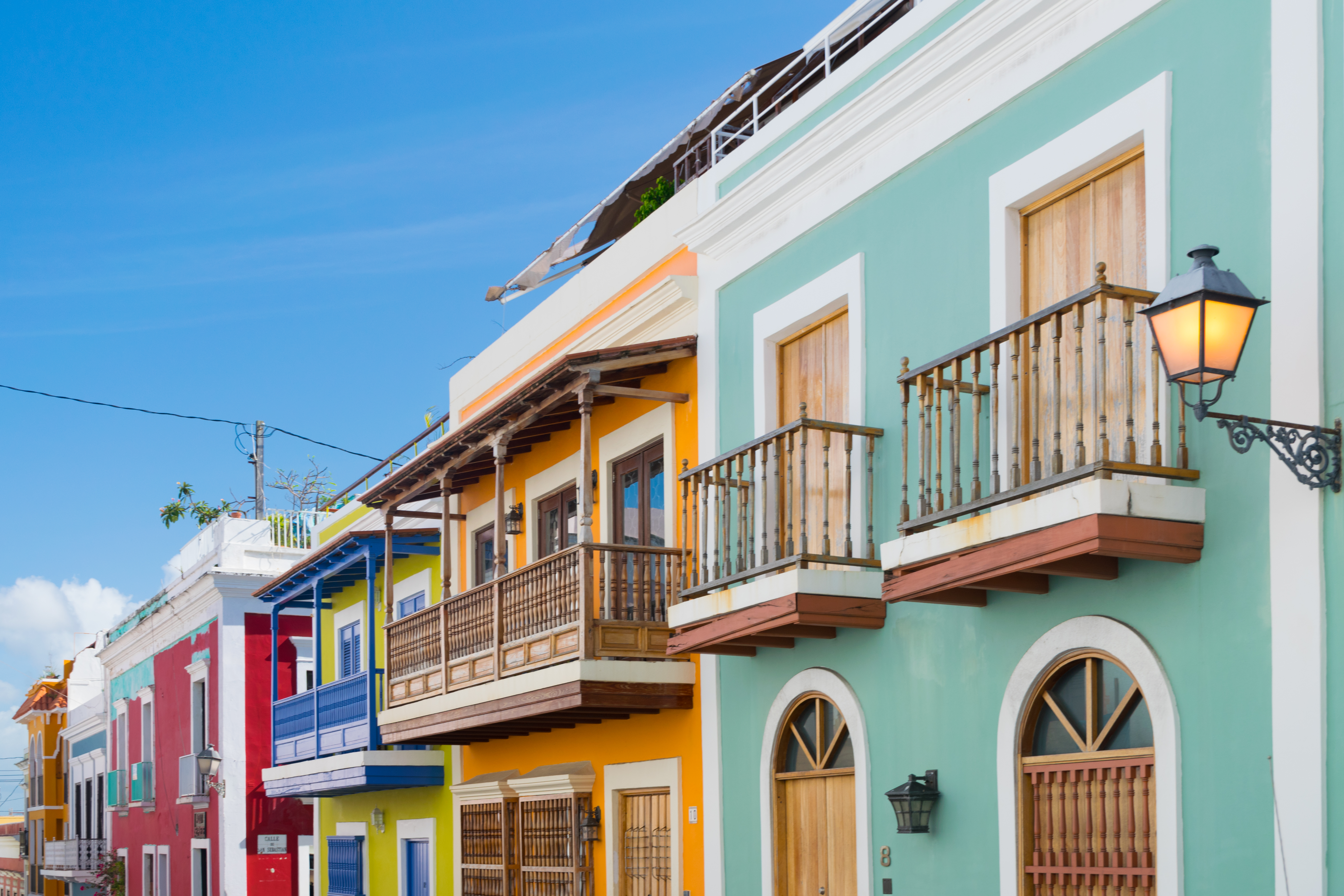
Street-lined homes in Old San Juan

Old San Juan is one of the two barrios, in addition to Santurce, that made up the municipality of San Juan from 1864 to 1951, at which time the former independent municipality of Río Piedras was annexed. With its abundance of shops, historic places, museums, open air cafés, restaurants, gracious homes, tree-shaded plazas, and its old beauty and architectonical peculiarity, Old San Juan is a main spot for local and internal tourism. The district is also characterized by numerous public plazas and churches including San José Church and the Cathedral of San Juan Bautista, which contains the tomb of the Spanish explorer Juan Ponce de León. It also houses the oldest Catholic school for elementary education in Puerto Rico, the Colegio de Párvulos, built in 1865.

The oldest parts of the district of Old San Juan remain partly enclosed by massive walls. Several defensive structures and notable forts, such as the emblematic Fort San Felipe del Morro, Fort San Cristóbal, and El Palacio de Santa Catalina, also known as La Fortaleza, acted as the primary defenses of the settlement which was subjected to numerous attacks. La Fortaleza continues to serve also as the executive mansion for the governor of Puerto Rico. Many of the historic fortifications are part of San Juan National Historic Site.

During the 1940s, sections of Old San Juan fell into disrepair, and many renovation plans were suggested in the following decades and into the present. There was even a strong push to develop Old San Juan as a "small Manhattan". Strict remodeling codes were implemented to prevent new constructions from affecting the common colonial Spanish architectural themes of the old city. When a project proposal suggested that the old Carmelite Convent in San Juan be demolished to erect a new hotel, the Institute had the building declared as a historic building, and then asked that it be converted to a hotel in a renewed facility. This was what became the Hotel El Convento in Old San Juan. The paradigm to reconstruct and renovate the old city and revitalize it has been followed by other cities in the Americas, particularly Havana, Lima and Cartagena de Indias.

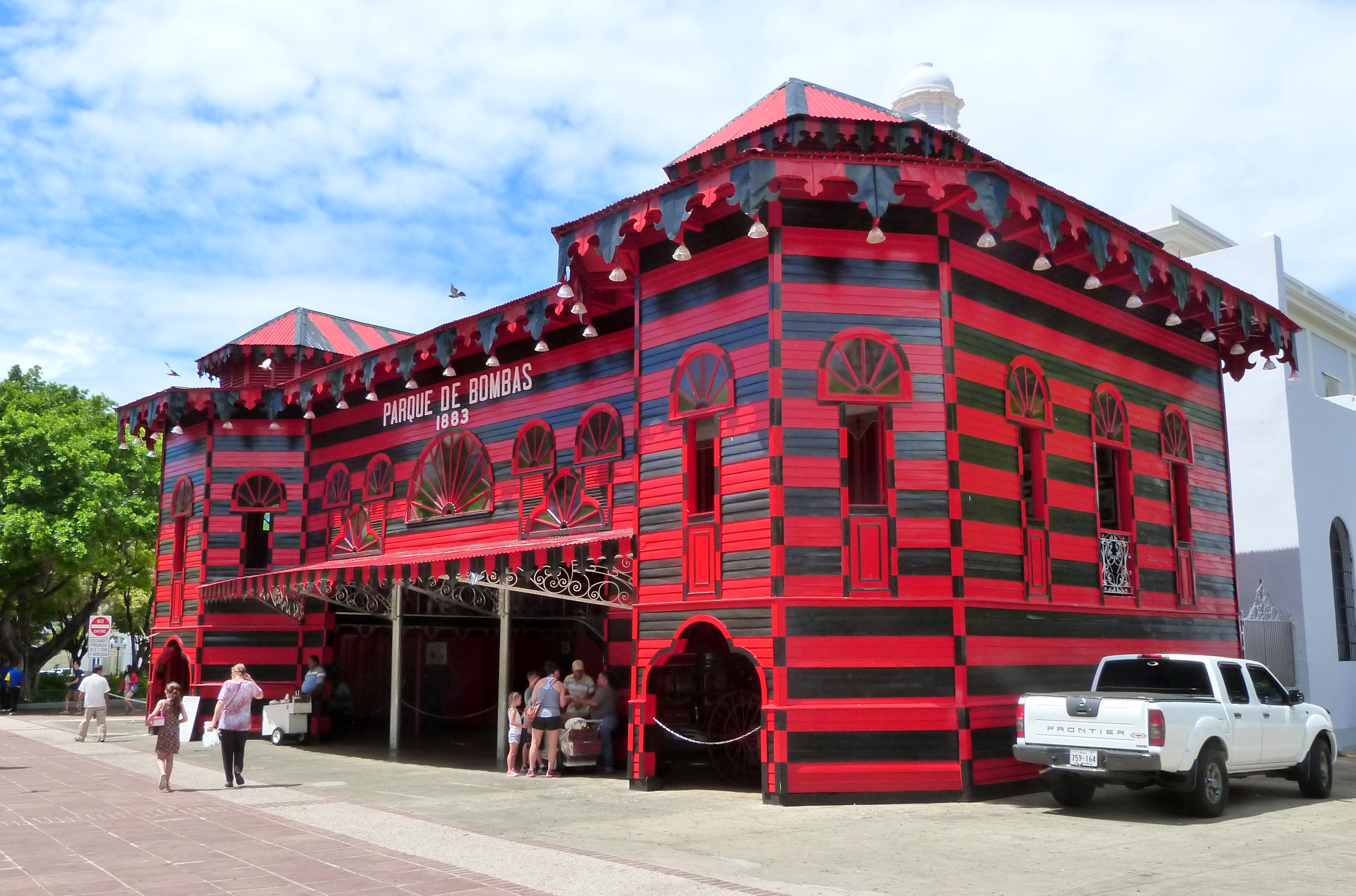
Parque de Bombas, a landmark of Ponce, a former fire station built in 1882

Ponce Creole is a unique architectural style created in Ponce, Puerto Rico, in the late 19th and early 20th centuries. This style of Puerto Rican buildings is found predominantly in residential homes in Ponce that developed between 1895 and 1920. Ponce Creole architecture borrows heavily from the traditions of France, Spain and the Caribbean vernacular to create houses that were especially built to withstand the hot and dry climate of the region, and to take advantage of the sun and sea breezes characteristic of the southern Puerto Rico's Caribbean Sea coast. It is a blend of wood and masonry, incorporating architectural elements of other styles, from Classical revival and Spanish Revival to Victorian.

=== Arts ===
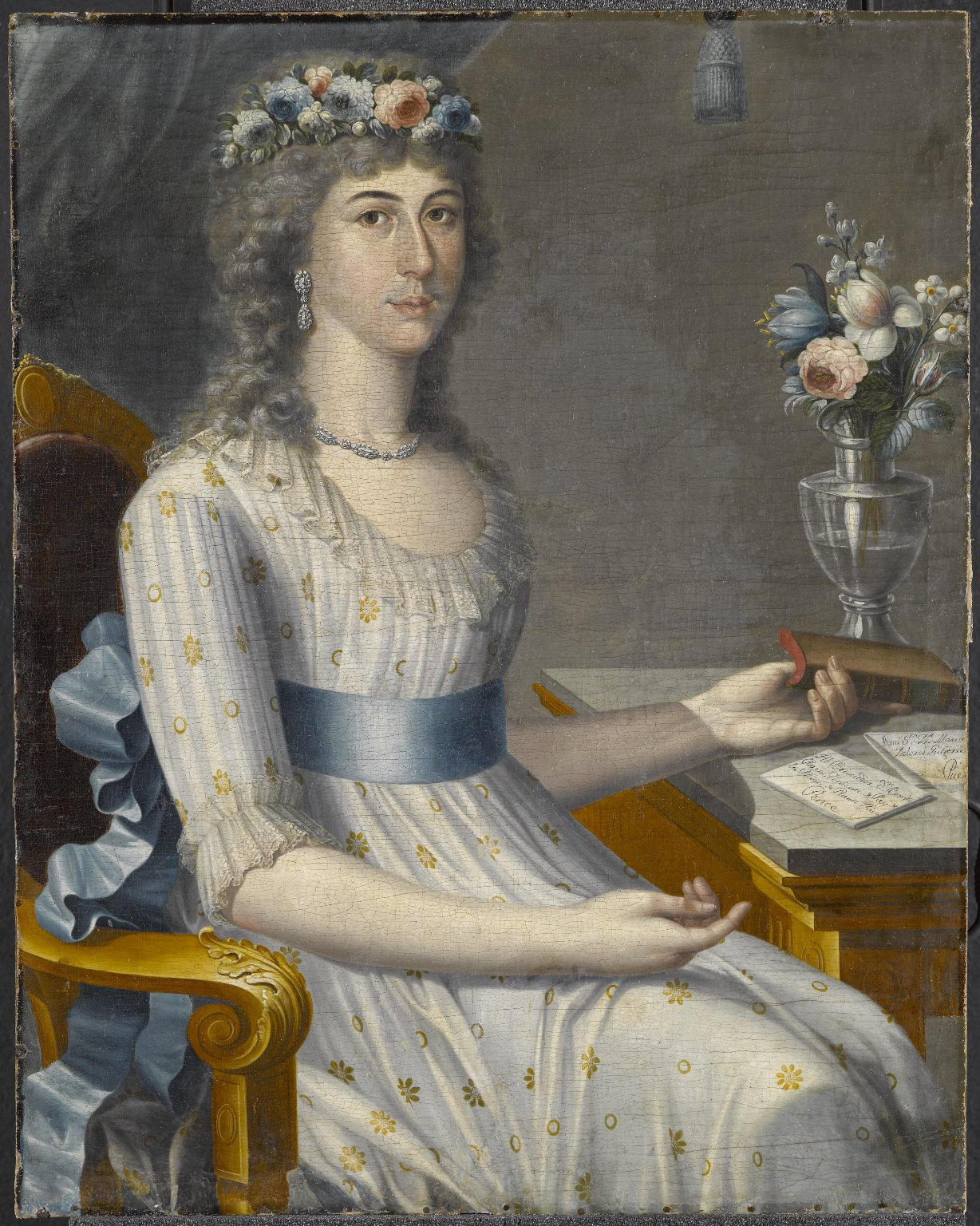
María de los Dolores Gutiérrez del Mazo, in colonial Puerto Rico, in 1796, by the mulatto Rococo painter José Campeche. Painting currently housed in the Brooklyn Museum.

Puerto Rican art reflects many influences, much from its ethnically diverse background. A form of folk art called santos evolved from the Catholic Church's use of sculptures to convert Indigenous Puerto Ricans to Christianity. Santos depict figures of saints and other religious icons and are made from native wood, clay, and stone. After shaping simple, they are often finished by painting them in vivid colors. Santos vary in size, with the smallest examples around eight inches tall and the largest about twenty inches tall. Traditionally, santos were seen as messengers between the earth and Heaven. As such, they occupied a special place on household altars, where people prayed to them, asked for help, or tried to summon their protection.

Also popular, caretas or vejigantes are masks worn during carnivals. Similar masks signifying evil spirits were used in both Spain and Africa, though for different purposes. The Spanish used their masks to frighten lapsed Christians into returning to the church, while tribal Africans used them as protection from the evil spirits they represented. True to their historic origins, Puerto Rican caretas always bear at least several horns and fangs. While usually constructed of papier-mâché, coconut shells and fine metal screening are sometimes used as well. Red and black were the typical colors for caretas but their palette has expanded to include a wide variety of bright hues and patterns.

=== Literature ===
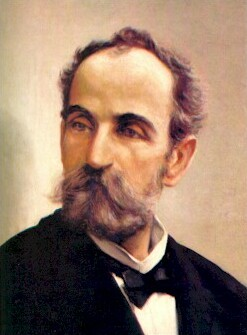
Eugenio María de Hostos

Puerto Rican literature evolved from the art of oral story telling to its present-day status. Written works by native islanders were prohibited and repressed by the Spanish colonial government. Only those who were commissioned by the Spanish Crown to document the chronological history of the island were allowed to write. Diego de Torres Vargas was allowed to circumvent this strict prohibition and in 1647 wrote Descripción de la Ciudad e Isla de Puerto Rico ("Description of the Island and City of Puerto Rico"). This historical book was the first to make a detailed geographic description of the island.

Early writers were influenced by the teachings of Rafael Cordero. Among these was Manuel A. Alonso, the first Puerto Rican writer of notable importance. In 1849 he published El Gíbaro, a collection of verses whose main themes were the poor country farmer. Eugenio María de Hostos wrote La peregrinación de Bayoán in 1863, which used Bartolomé de las Casas as a springboard to reflect on Caribbean identity. Hostos abandoned fiction in favor of the essay which he saw as offering greater possibilities for inspiring social change.

In the late 19th century, with the arrival of the first printing press and the founding of the Royal Academy of Belles Letters, Puerto Rican literature began to flourish. The first writers to express their political views in regard to Spanish colonial rule of the island were journalists. Alejandro Tapia y Rivera, also known as the father of Puerto Rican Literature, ushered in a new age of historiography with the publication of The Historical Library of Puerto Rico. Cayetano Coll y Toste's The Indo-Antillano Vocabulary is valuable in understanding the way the Taínos lived. Manuel Zeno Gandía's 1894 La Charca discusses the harsh life in the remote and mountainous coffee regions. Antonio S. Pedreira describes in his work Insularismo the cultural survival of the Puerto Rican identity after the American invasion.

With the Puerto Rican diaspora of the 1940s, Puerto Rican literature was greatly influenced by a phenomenon known as the Nuyorican movement. Puerto Rican literature continued to flourish, and many Puerto Ricans have since distinguished themselves as authors, journalists, poets, novelists, playwrights, essayists, and screenwriters. The influence of Puerto Rican literature has transcended the boundaries of the island to the U.S. and the rest of the world. Notable writers include Ed Vega, Miguel Piñero, Piri Thomas, Giannina Braschi, Rosario Ferrer, and Esmeralda Santiago.

=== Music ===
A dancer performs typical bomba choreography.

The music of Puerto Rico has evolved as a heterogeneous and dynamic product of diverse cultural resources. The most conspicuous musical sources have been Spain and West Africa, although many aspects of Puerto Rican music reflect origins elsewhere in Europe and the Caribbean and, over the last century, from the U.S. Music culture today comprises a wide and rich variety of genres, ranging from Indigenous genres like bomba, plena, aguinaldo, danza and the popular salsa to recent hybrids like reggaeton and Latin trap, popular with the new generation of musicians and popularized across the world by Puerto Rican musician Bad Bunny. Musical artists with great international success include Menudo and Ricky Martin.

The cuatro is a local instrument that was made by the "Jibaro" or people from the mountains. Originally, the cuatro consisted of four steel strings, hence its name, but currently the cuatro consists of five double steel strings. There are two orchestras, the Orquesta Sinfónica de Puerto Rico and the Orquesta Filarmónica de Puerto Rico. The Casals Festival takes place annually in San Juan, drawing in classical musicians from around the world. The legendary opera tenor Antonio Paoli was so celebrated that he performed private recitals for Pope Pius X and Tsar Nicholas II of Russia. In 1907, Paoli was the first operatic artist in world history to record an entire opera – when he participated in a performance of Pagliacci by Ruggiero Leoncavallo in Milan, Italy.

=== Philately ===
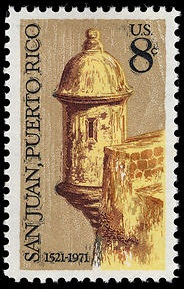
San Juan 450th 1971 issue, depicting one of the garitas of El Morro

Puerto Rico has been commemorated on four U.S. postal stamps. Insular Territories were commemorated in 1937, the third stamp honored Puerto Rico featuring 'La Fortaleza', the Spanish Governor's Palace. The first free election for governor of the U.S. territory of Puerto Rico was honored on April 27, 1949, at San Juan. 'Inauguration' on the 3-cent stamp refers to the election of Luis Muñoz Marín, the first democratically elected governor. San Juan was commemorated with an 8-cent stamp on its 450th anniversary issued September 12, 1971, featuring a sentry box from Castillo San Felipe del Morro. In the "Flags of our nation series" 2008–2012, of the 55, five territorial flags were featured. Forever stamps included the Puerto Rico Flag illustrated by a bird issued 2011.

=== Cuisine ===
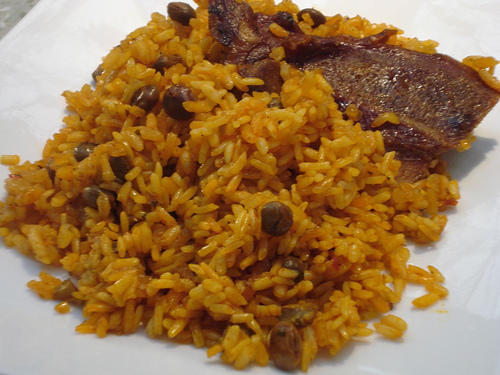
Arroz con gandules, widely regarded as "Puerto Rico's national dish"

Puerto Rican cuisine has its roots in the cooking traditions and practices of Europe (Spain), Africa and Taíno. Basic ingredients include grains and legumes, herbs and spices, starchy tropical tubers, vegetables, meat and poultry, seafood and shellfish, and fruits. Main dishes include mofongo, arroz con gandules, pasteles, and pig roast (or lechón). Beverages include maví and piña colada. Desserts include flan, arroz con dulce (sweet rice pudding), piraguas, brazo gitanos, tembleque, polvorones, and dulce de leche.

=== Sports ===
Baseball was one of the first sports to gain widespread popularity in Puerto Rico. The Puerto Rico Baseball League serves as the only active professional league, operating as a winter league. No Major League Baseball franchise or affiliate plays in Puerto Rico; however, San Juan hosted the Montreal Expos for several series in 2003 and 2004 before they moved to Washington, D.C. and became the Washington Nationals.

The Puerto Rico national baseball team has participated in the World Cup of Baseball winning one gold (1951), four silver and four bronze medals, the Caribbean Series (winning fourteen times) and the World Baseball Classic. In March 2006, San Juan's Hiram Bithorn Stadium hosted the opening round as well as the second round of the newly formed World Baseball Classic. Puerto Rican baseball players include Hall of Famers Roberto Clemente, Orlando Cepeda and Roberto Alomar, enshrined in 1973, 1999, and 2011 respectively.

Boxing, basketball, and volleyball are popular sports as well. Wilfredo Gómez and McWilliams Arroyo have won their respective divisions at the World Amateur Boxing Championships. Other medalists include José Pedraza, who holds a silver medal, and three boxers who finished in third place, José Luis Vellón, Nelson Dieppa and McJoe Arroyo. In the professional circuit, Puerto Rico has the third-most boxing world champions and it is the global leader in champions per capita. These include Miguel Cotto, Félix Trinidad, Wilfred Benítez and Gómez among others.

The Puerto Rico national basketball team joined the International Basketball Federation in 1957. Since then, it has won more than 30 medals in international competitions, including gold in three FIBA Americas Championships and the 1994 Goodwill Games August 8, 2004, became a landmark date for the team when it became the first team to defeat the United States in an Olympic tournament since the integration of National Basketball Association players. Winning the inaugural game with scores of 92–73 as part of the 2004 Summer Olympics organized in Athens, Greece. Baloncesto Superior Nacional acts as the top-level professional basketball league in Puerto Rico and has experienced success since its beginning in 1930. Puerto Rico is a member of FIFA and CONCACAF. In 2008, the archipelago's first unified league, the Puerto Rico Soccer League, was established.

Other sports include professional wrestling and road running. The World Wrestling Council and International Wrestling Association are the largest wrestling promotions in the main island. The World's Best 10K, held annually in San Juan, has been ranked among the 20 most competitive races globally. The "Puerto Rico All Stars" team, which has won twelve world championships in unicycle basketball. Organized streetball has gathered some exposition, with teams like "Puerto Rico Street Ball" competing against established organizations including the Capitanes de Arecibo and AND1's Mixtape Tour Team. Six years after the first visit, AND1 returned as part of their renamed Live Tour, losing to the Puerto Rico Streetballers. Consequently, practitioners of this style have earned participation in international teams, including Orlando "El Gato" Meléndez, who became the first Puerto Rican born athlete to play for the Harlem Globetrotters.

Puerto Rico has representation in all international competitions including the Summer and Winter Olympics, the Pan American Games, the Caribbean World Series, and the Central American and Caribbean Games. Puerto Rico hosted the Pan Am Games in 1979 (officially in San Juan), and The Central American and Caribbean Games were hosted in 1993 in Ponce and in 2010 in Mayagüez. Puerto Rican athletes have won ten medals in Olympic competition (two gold, two silver, six bronze), the first one in 1948 by boxer Juan Evangelista Venegas. Monica Puig won the first gold medal for Puerto Rico in the Olympic Games by winning the Women's Tennis singles title in Rio 2016.

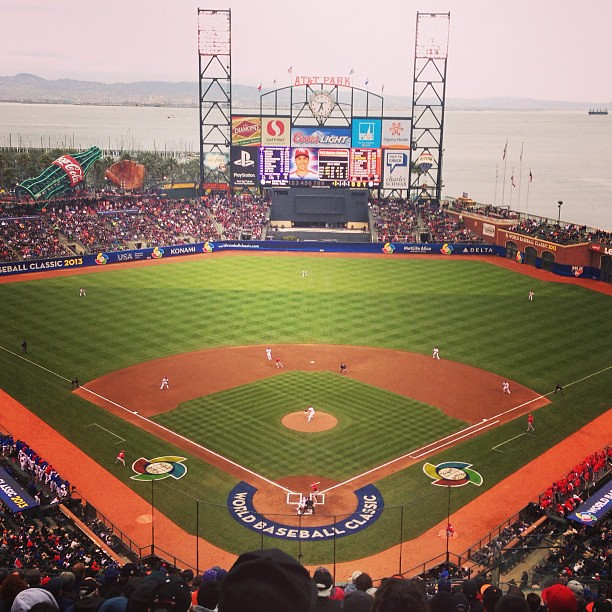
2013 World Baseball Classic championship between Puerto Rico and Dominican Republic, 20 March 2013

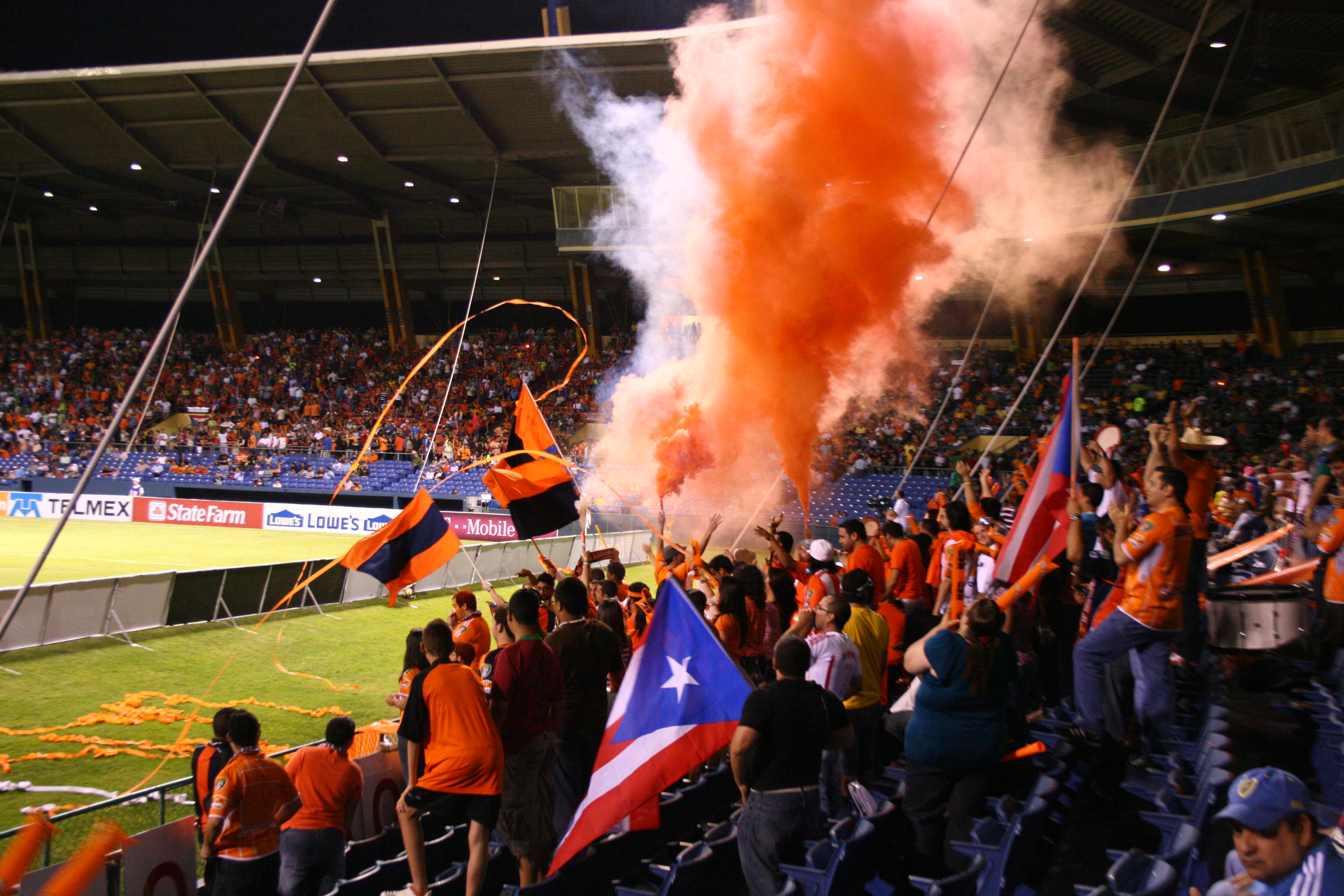
Puerto Rico Islanders fans at a soccer game

== See also ==
- Outline of Puerto Rico
- List of islands of Puerto Rico
