= Isla de Mona e Islote Monito, Mayagüez, Puerto Rico =

Barrio of Puerto Rico

Isla de Mona e Islote Monito
- Barrio
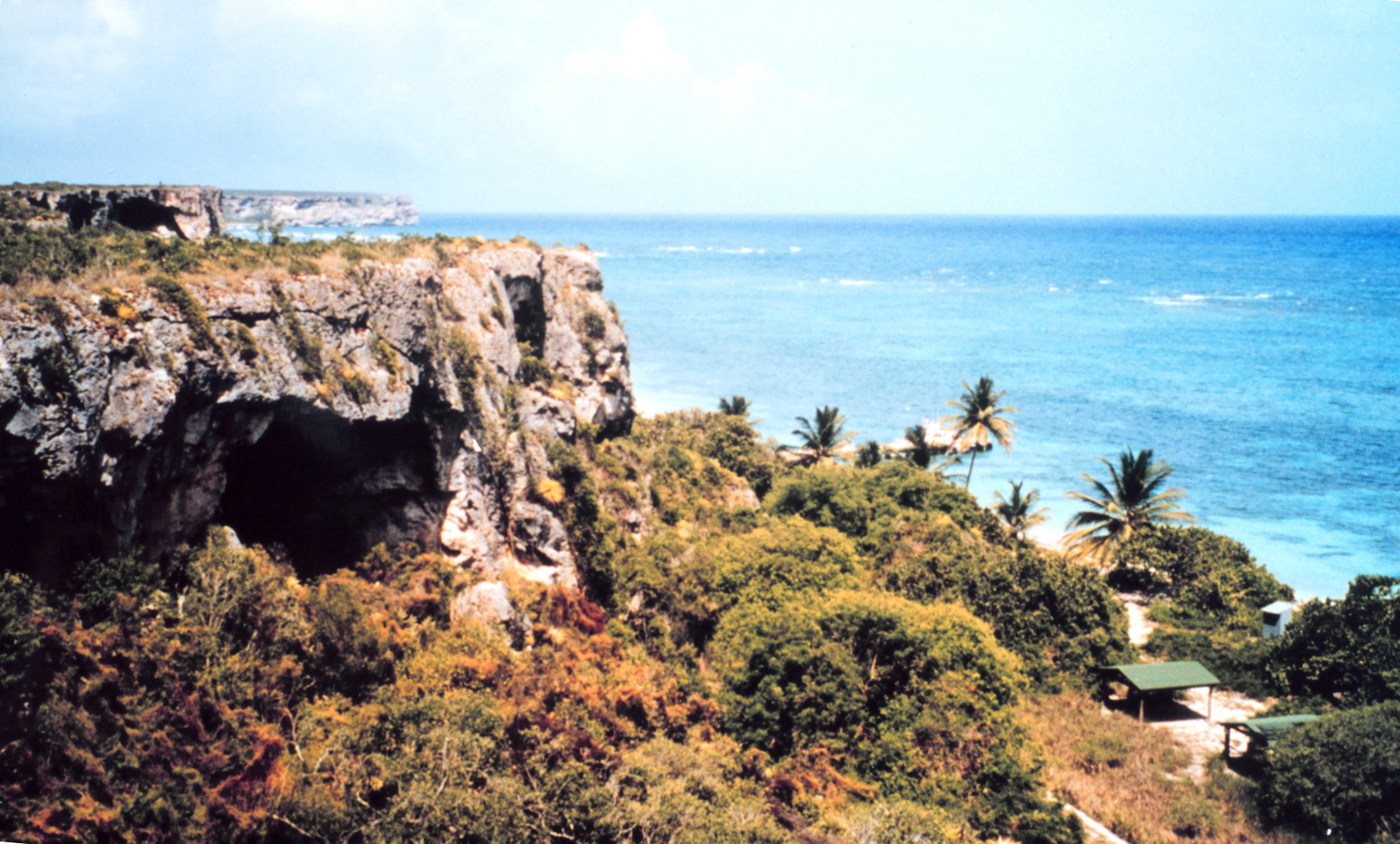
- Playa Pájaros in Mona Island

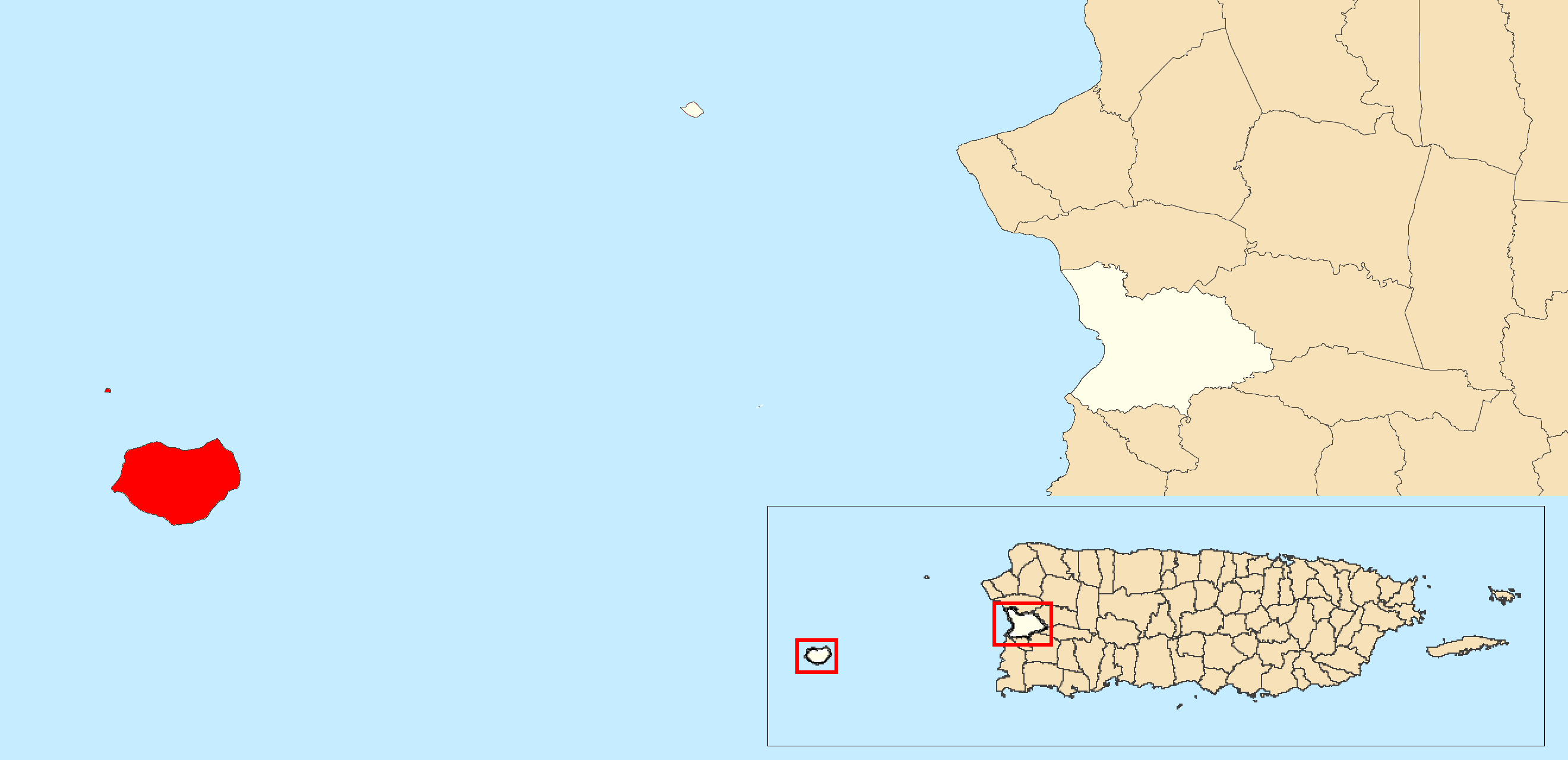
- Location of Isla de Mona e Islote Monito within the municipality of Mayagüez shown in red

- Location of Puerto Rico
- Coordinates: 18°05′02″N 67°53′11″W
- Commonwealth: Puerto Rico
- Municipality: Mayagüez

Area
  - Total: 30.11 sq mi (78.0 km^{2})
  - Land: 21.98 sq mi (56.9 km^{2})
  - Water: 8.13 sq mi (21.1 km^{2})
- Elevation: 197 ft (60 m)

Population (2010)
  - Total: 5
- 2010 census
- Time zone: UTC−4 (AST)

Isla de Mona e Islote Monito is an island-barrio of Mayagüez, Puerto Rico. The U.S. census of 2000 reports six housing units, but a population of zero. The barrio is made up of the islands of Mona and Monito. In 2010, there was a population of 5. This is the largest barrio of Mayagüez by area. The total land area of both islands in the barrio is about 56.93 km^{2} (Mona Island 56.783 km^{2} and nearby Monito Island 0.147 km^{2}), and it comprises 28.3 percent of the total land area of the municipality of Mayagüez. Desecheo Island, 49 km to the northeast, is part of Sabanetas barrio. The Mona Island Lighthouse is located in the barrio. Isla de Mona e Islote Monito is surrounded by the Mona Passage.

Historical population
Census	Pop.	Note	%±
1900	6		—
1910	28		366.7%
1920	35		25.0%
1930	35		0.0%
1940	156		345.7%
1950	3		−98.1%
1960	0		−100.0%
1970	6		—
1980	0		−100.0%
1990	0		—
2000	0		—
2010	5		—
U.S. Decennial Census; 1899 (shown as 1900) 1910-1930; 1930-1950 1980-2000 2010

== History ==
Isla de Mona e Islote Monito were in Spain's gazetteers until Puerto Rico was ceded by Spain in the aftermath of the Spanish–American War under the terms of the Treaty of Paris of 1898 and became an unincorporated territory of the United States. In 1899, the United States Department of War conducted a census of Puerto Rico finding that the population of Mona was 6.

== See also ==
- List of communities in Puerto Rico
