= MV Jireh =

Cargo ship shipwrecked in Puerto Rico

MV Jireh was a cargo ship involved in a shipwreck on Mona Island in 2012. The freighter was 185 feet in length.

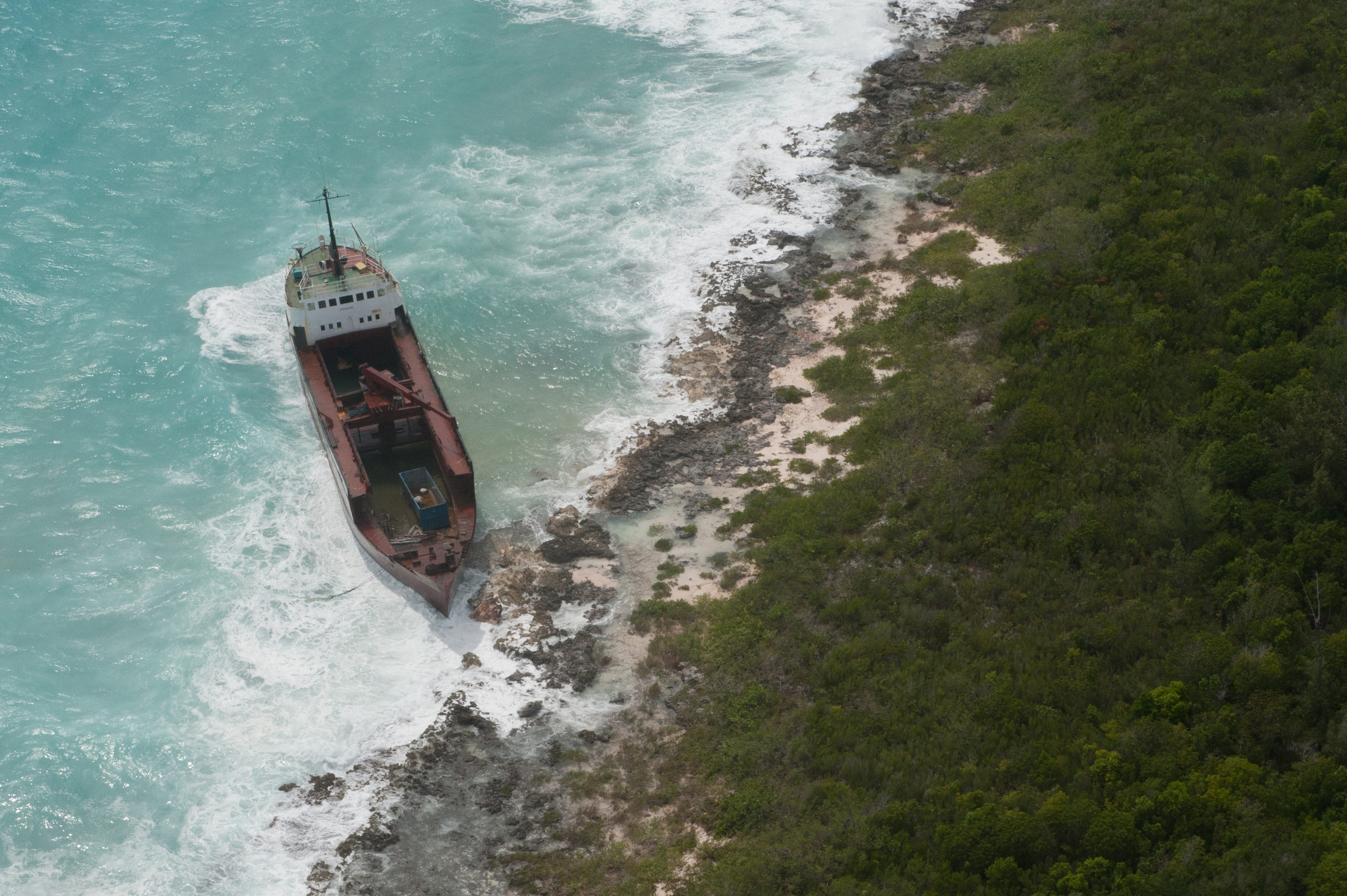
MV Jireh aground on Mona Island

On June 21, 2012, the ship ran aground against the uninhabited island, which is a part of Puerto Rico. Working together, NOAA, the US Fish and Wildlife Service, the Commonwealth of Puerto Rico, and the US Coast Guard removed the fuel and oil on board, averting a major oil spill. The ship was then cut up and removed section by section. The salvage operation was interrupted by Tropical Storm Isaac in August. The last chunk of the vessel was removed in October. About one thousand corals were relocated to prevent damage from anchors and cables used during the salvage operation.

The island has been the location of other shipwrecks and groundings, including the container ship Fortuna Reefer in July 1997.
