= Mona Canyon =

Submarine canyon in the Mona Passage

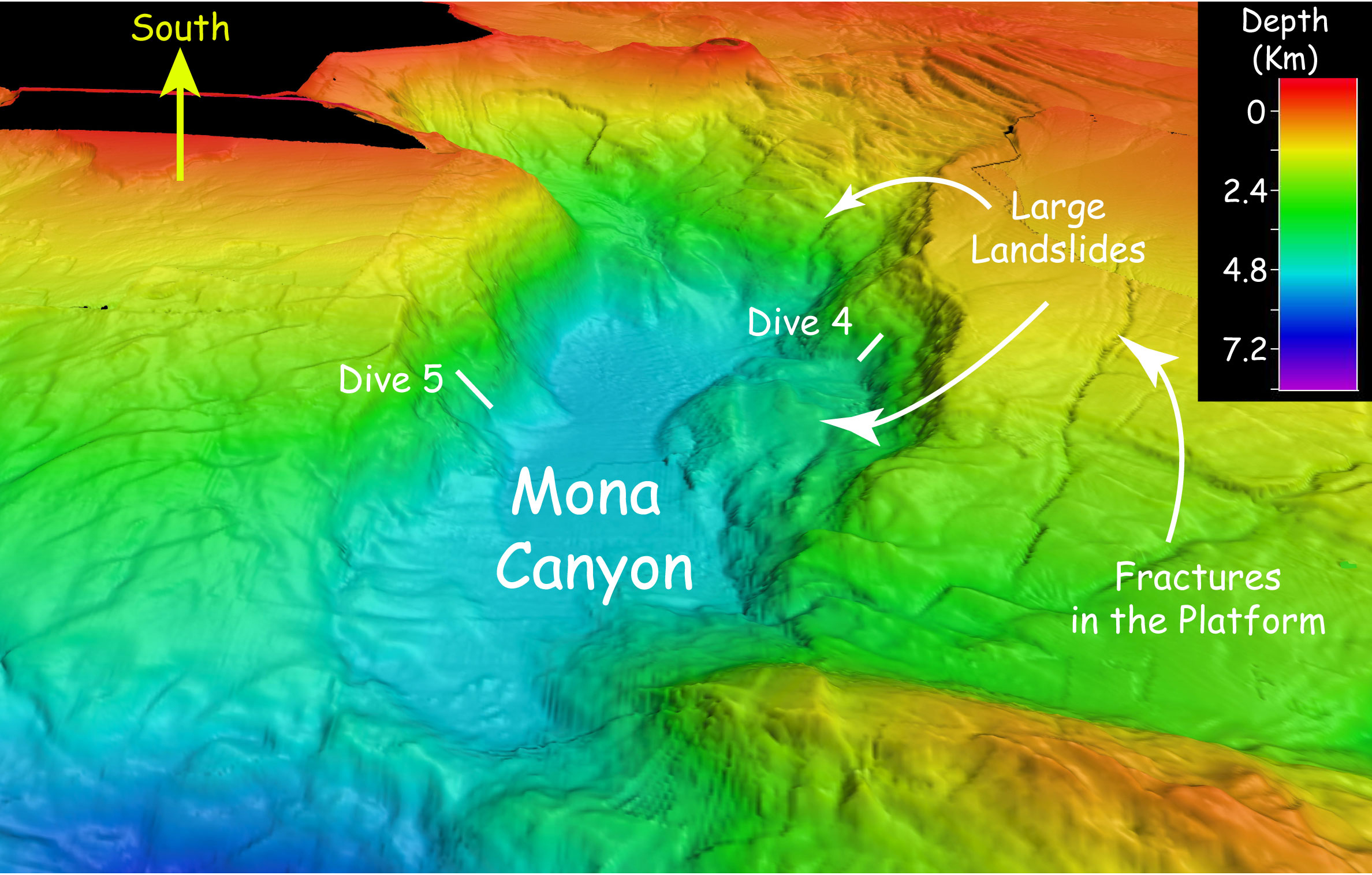
NOAA computer image depicting research dives in the Monterey Canyon system

Mona Canyon (Spanish: Cañón de la Mona), also known as the Mona Rift, is an 87-mile-long (140 km) submarine canyon located in the Mona Passage, between the islands of Hispaniola (particularly the Dominican Republic) and Puerto Rico, with steep walls measuring between 1.25 and 2.17 miles (2.01 and 3.49 km) in height from bottom to top. The Mona Canyon stretches from the Desecheo Island platform, specifically the Desecheo Ridge, in the south to the Puerto Rico Trench, which contains some of the deepest points in the Atlantic Ocean, in the north. The canyon is also particularly associated with earthquakes and subsequent tsunamis, with the 1918 Puerto Rico earthquake having its epicenter in the submarine canyon.

== Geomorphology ==
The Mona submarine canyon geomorphology is highly complex yet unexplored. The complex seafloor is the result of oceanographic and tectonic forces that are actively forming and reshaping the landscape of the region. The canyon is located in an intricate and irregular tectonic region at the boundary between the Caribbean and North American plates, where the east–west transversing subduction Septentrional Fault ends in an approximately 1,000-meter-deep (3,300 ft) hole west of the landform.

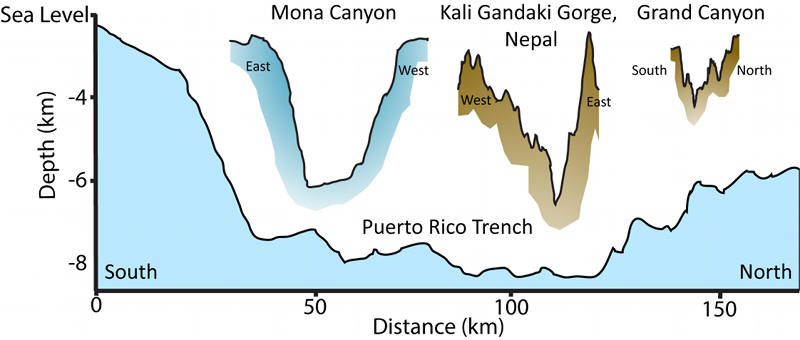
Size comparison between the Mona Canyon, the Puerto Rico Trench and other famous canyons

== Geology ==
The Mona Canyon geology has been explored through a series of ocean dives completed during Expedition EX1811. Notably, dives 12 and 19 from Expedition EX1811 in November 2018 describe the geology of the East Wall of the Mona Canyon and the Mona Seamount respectfully. In dive 12, observations included soft sediment that gradually transitioned to more jagged rocky outcrops. Rocks were observed encrusted with FeMn as well. In dive 19, the site featured soft sediment with some cobble, boulders, and rocky outcrops displaying linear features similar to limestone formations. The rocky outcrops were typically composed of cracked angular rock with relatively fresh surfaces and white-tan coloration contrasting the dark rock encrusted with FeMn.

== Biology ==
Dives 12 and 19 from the Expedition EX1811 conducted by the NOAA ship Okeanos Explorer both had a common goal to characterize the deep-sea fauna found during the exploration. The fauna at the dive 12 site included sparse fish species, with cusk eels (Barathrodenus manatinus) being the most common, and low sponge diversity, primarily dominated by glass sponges. Echinoderms, including sea cucumbers, brittle stars, and sea stars, were the most abundant organisms, with deep-sea corals and some carnivorous sponges also present.

The fauna at the dive 19 site included two coral species, Umbellula sp. and Abyssopathes cf. lyra, along with diverse invertebrates such as Cladorhizid sponges, Munnopsid isopods (cf. Storthyngula sp.), squat lobsters, and tube-dwelling anemones. Other notable organisms included brittle stars, Rhodaliid siphonophores, and various deep-sea worms, highlighting a rich invertebrate diversity.

== See also ==
- List of submarine canyons
