= Mona Island Tramway =

Historic railway on Mona Island, in Mayagüez, Puerto Rico

Coordinates: 43.9319°N 143.3344°E

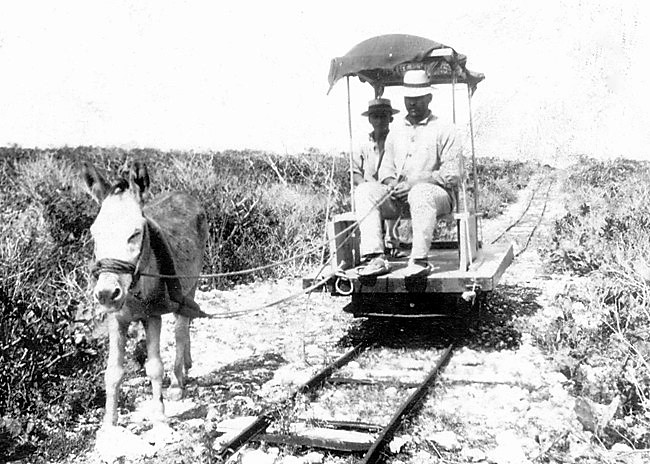
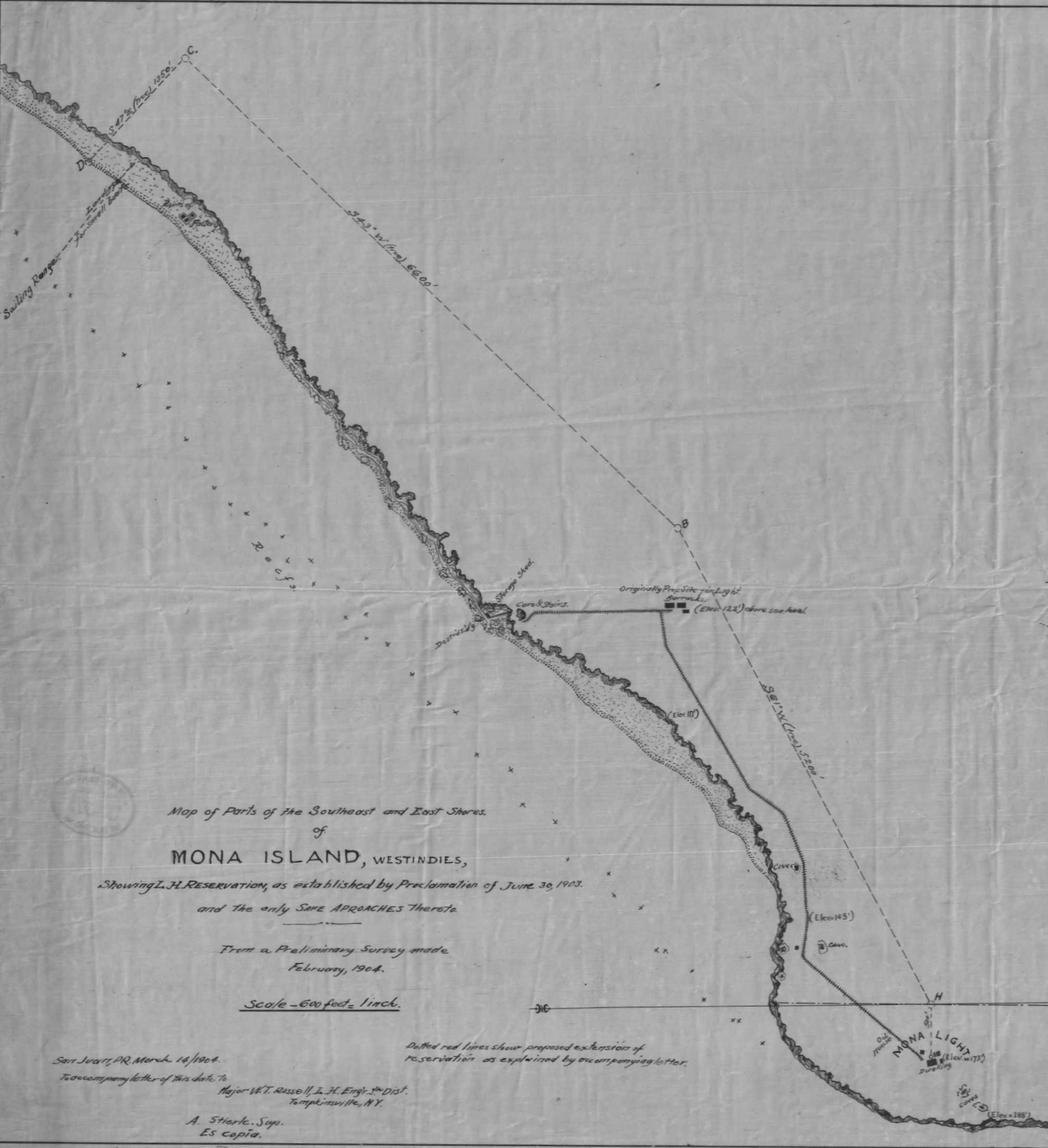
- The donkey Macario hauls a four-wheel waggon Map of track, 1904

Technical
- Line length: 1.8 kilometres (1.1 mi)
- Track gauge: 600 mm (1 ft 11 5/8 in)

The Mona Island Tramway (Spanish: Tranvía de la Isla de Mona) was a 1.8 kilometres (1.1 mi) long narrow-gauge industrial railway with a gauge of 600 mm (1 ft 11 5/8 in) on Mona Island, part of the municipality of Mayagüez, Puerto Rico. It was laid in the 1890s to transport building materials from the beach to the construction site of the 16 meter (52 foot) high Mona Island Lighthouse, which was put into operation on 30 April 1900.

== Route ==
The track consisted of two unconnected sections: The goods were unloaded from the ships at the Playa La Escalera and brought to a cave called Cueva Escalera via a 70 meters (231 feet) long incline, which was operated by a steam cable winch. A flight of stairs inside this cave led through the cave to a station on the plateau 37 m (122 feet) above sea level, from which a 1.8 kilometres (1.1 mi) long section of the track ran to the lighthouse. A storm destroyed the facilities at the Playa Escalera, whereupon Playa Pájaros was used for shipping, although it was 5 kilometers (3 miles) further away.

The hurricane of September 1921 tore off the roof of a lighthouse storage room and damaged the kitchen and the industrial tramway. The US Department of Commerce Inspection Report of 1922 highlights the difficulties of getting to the lighthouse: After mooring through a narrow passage between the reefs with a wind blowing towards the shore, a mile long cactus-covered walkway on the beach from Playa de Pajaro to Cueva de Escalera had to be walked. Then the first tramway ran up the incline with a 50% gradient to the cave. A flight of the stairs led through the cave, and then another 1.8 km (6,000 feet) long tramway had to be used, which often derailed because the 22-year-old rails were already crumbling. As late as 1925, a stubborn donkey named Macario hauled the wagon covered by a makeshift sunshade canopy. The construction of an automobile track started in 1927, whereupon the tramway lost its importance.

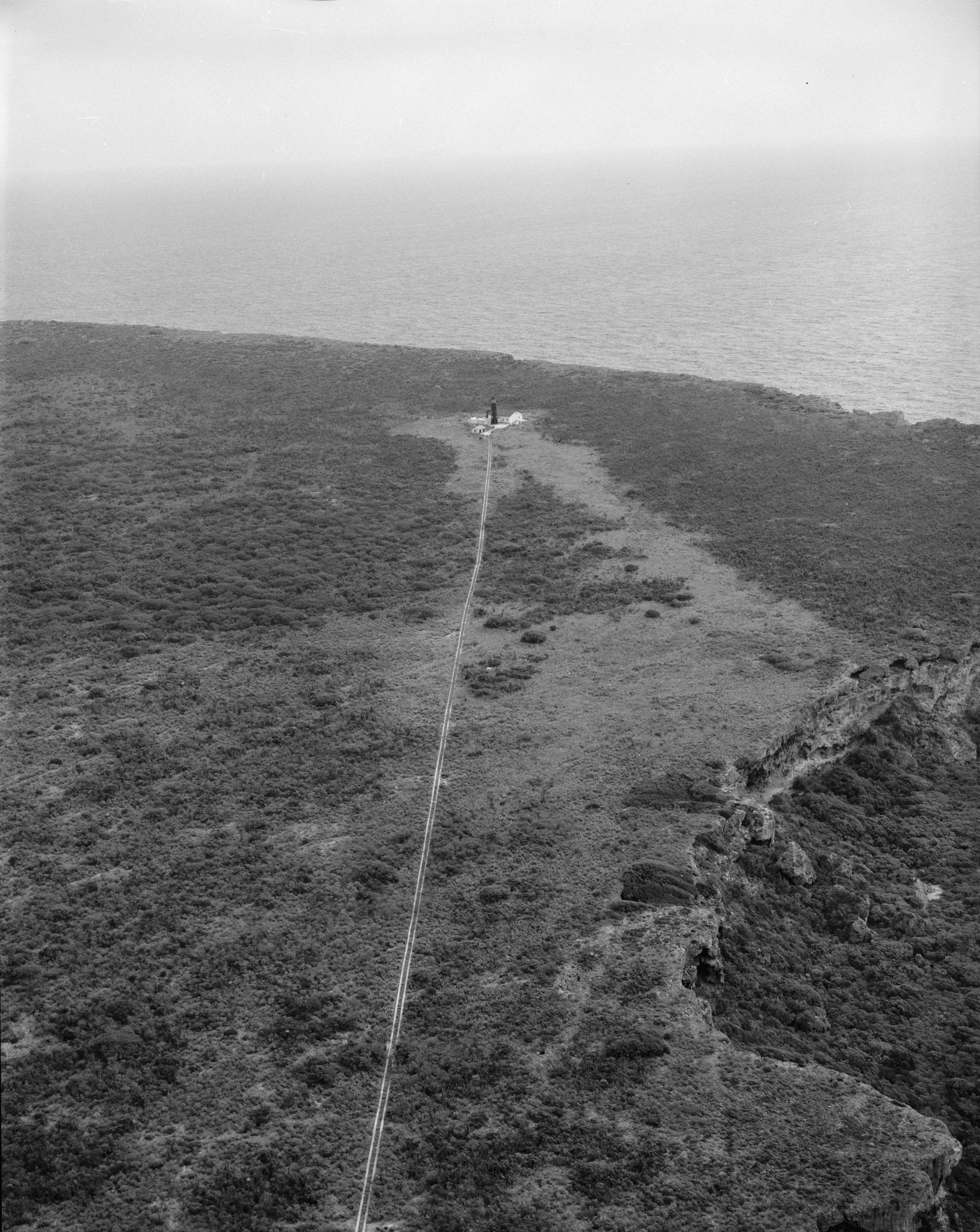
Track to the lighthouse, 1968

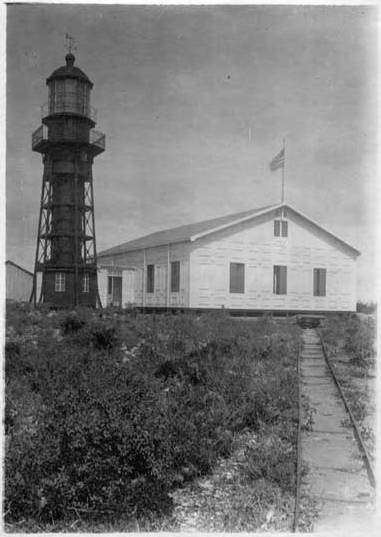
End of the rail track at the lighthouse, 1913

== Gauge ==
As the building material for the lighthouse was prefabricated and delivered by the French construction company Stapfer de Duclos & Cie, it may be assumed that a Decauville portable track with the metric gauge of 600 mm (1 ft 11 5/8 in) instead of the imperial gauge of 2 ft (610 mm), which was more common in other parts of Puerto Rico.

== U.S. National Register of Historic Places ==
The lighthouse, as "Faro de la Isla de la Mona", was listed on the U.S. National Register of Historic Places in 1981.

== Other narrow gauge railways ==
Other narrow gauge railways on the island served the mining of guano in the coastal caves. Most rails were removed from the caves over time. The only remaining stretch of track is the Cueva del Lirio. A few 4 metres (13 ft) long track segments with a track width of 500 mm (19 3/4 in) are still in situ in 1998 in the Cueva del Diamante and several other caves.
