= Monito Island =

Uninhabited island of Puerto Rico

Monito
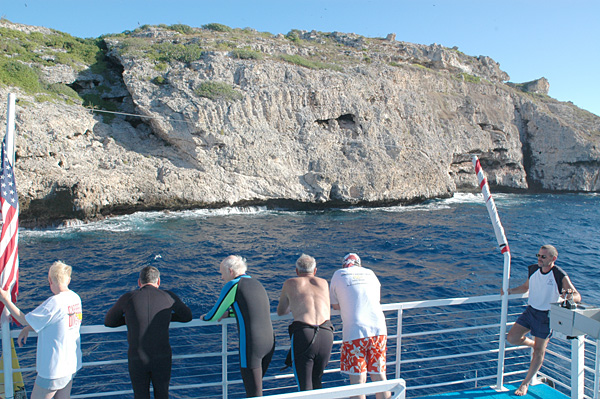
- Monito Island, Puerto Rico

- Location in Puerto Rico Location in the Lesser Antilles Location in Antilles

Geography
- Coordinates: 18.158208°N 67.94662°W
- Area: 0.147 km^{2} (0.057 sq mi)
- Highest elevation: 65 m (213 ft)

Administration
- United States; Puerto Rico
- Commonwealth: Puerto Rico
- Municipality: Mayagüez
- Barrio: Isla de Mona e Islote Monito

Demographics
- Population: 0
- Pop. density: 0/km^{2} (0/sq mi)

U.S. National Natural Landmark
- Designated: 1975

Monito Island (English: Little Mona, Spanish: Islote Monito) is an uninhabited island about 3.1 miles (5.0 km) northwest of the much larger Mona Island. Monito is the masculine diminutive form of Mona in Spanish, which also translates to little monkey in Spanish. It is one of three islands in the Mona Passage, and part of the Isla de Mona e Islote Monito barrio, a subdivision of the municipality of Mayagüez, Puerto Rico.

It is 46.43 miles (74.72 km) from the Puerto Rican mainland, and 35.73 miles (57.50 km) from the island of Hispaniola (the coast of the Dominican Republic).

== Description ==
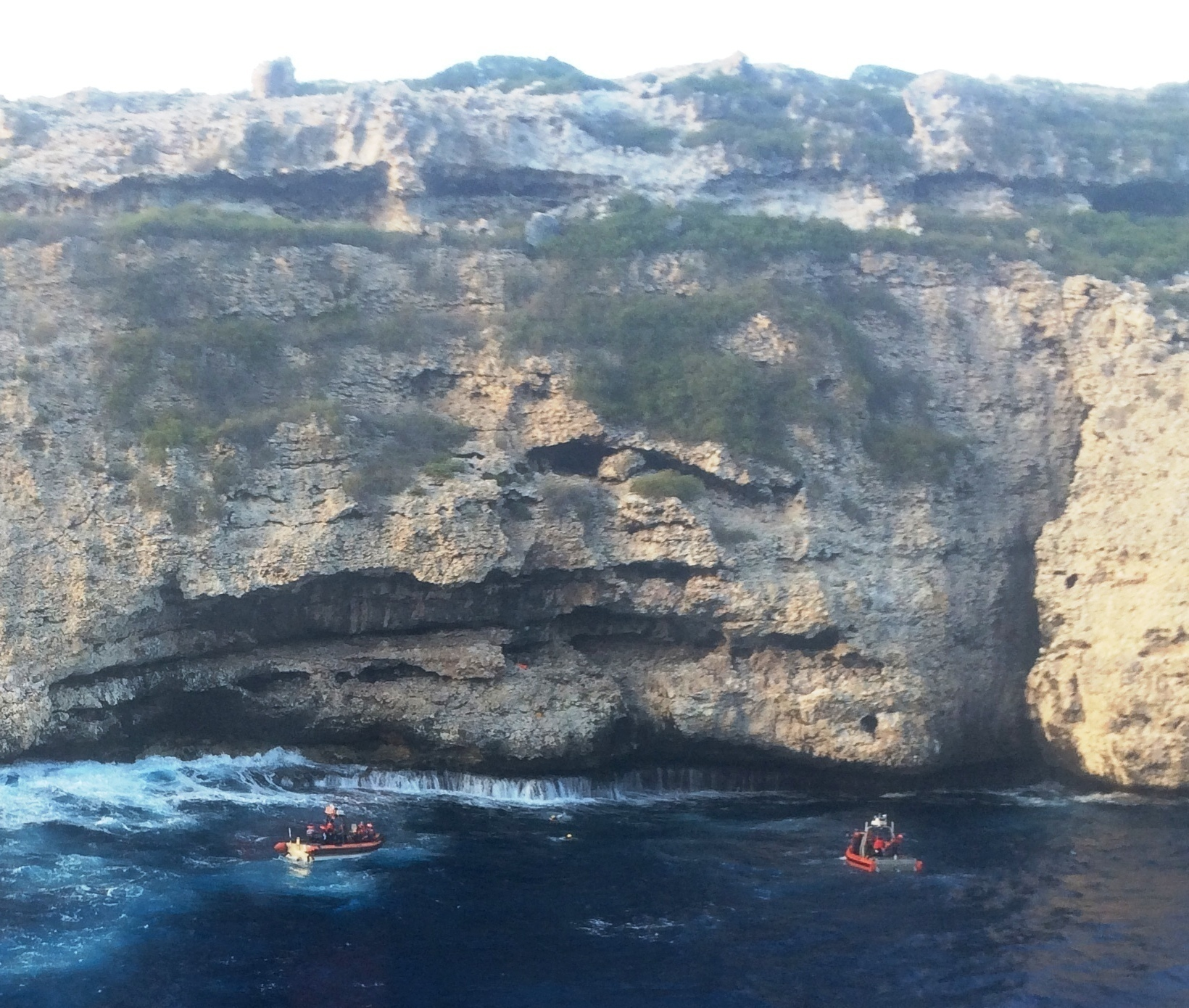
Migrants from Cuba rescued near Monito Island by the US Coast Guard

The island is uninhabited. The high altitude of the island's shoreline makes it inaccessible by sea. Monito has an area of 0.06 sq mi (0.16 km^{2}) or 36.25 acres (14.67 ha), its highest point is 213 ft (65 m), and is barren. The U.S. Coast Guard has rescued migrants off Monito Island. The Monito gecko is found only on Monito Island.

== Gallery ==
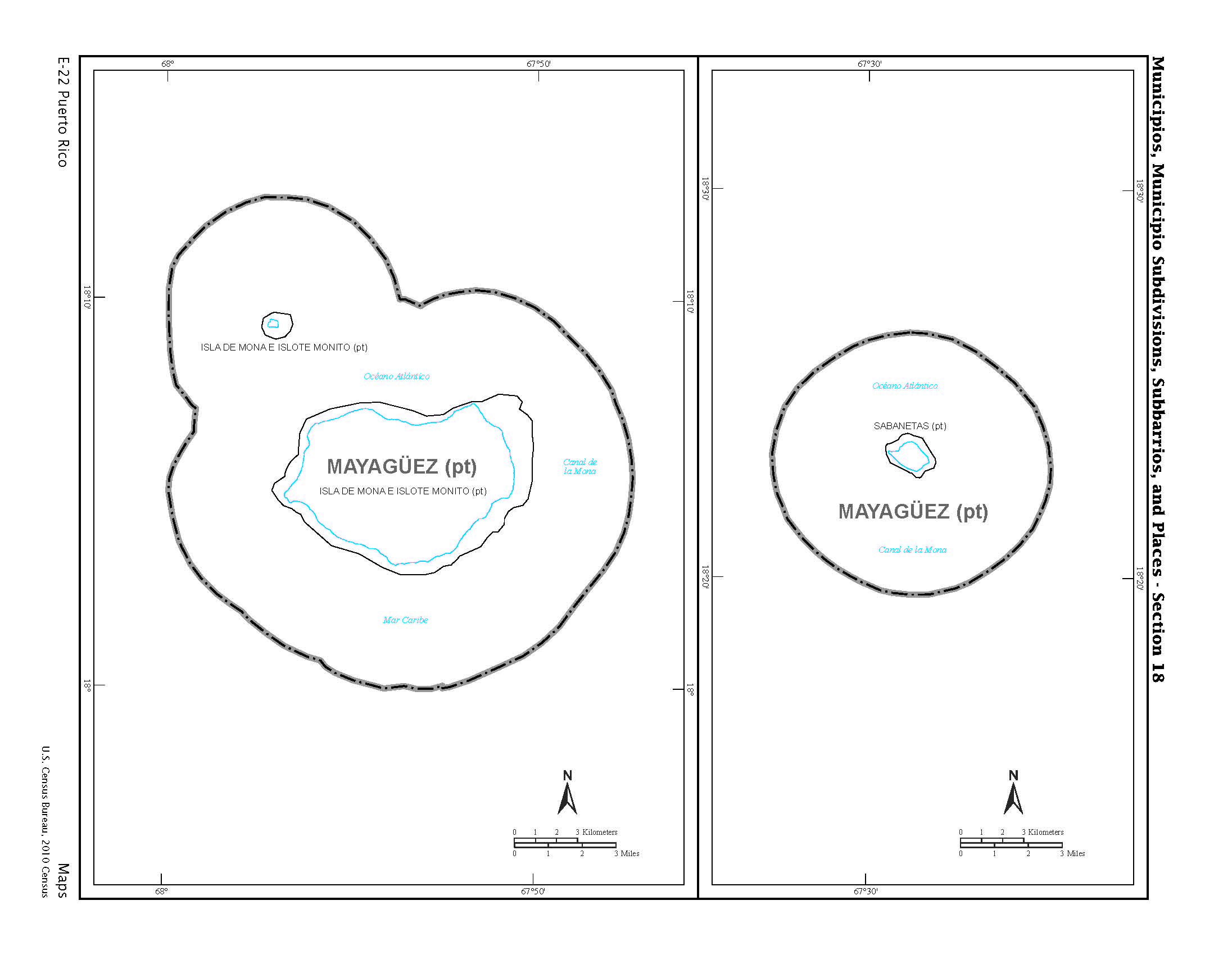
US 2010 Census map of the two islands off Mayagüez

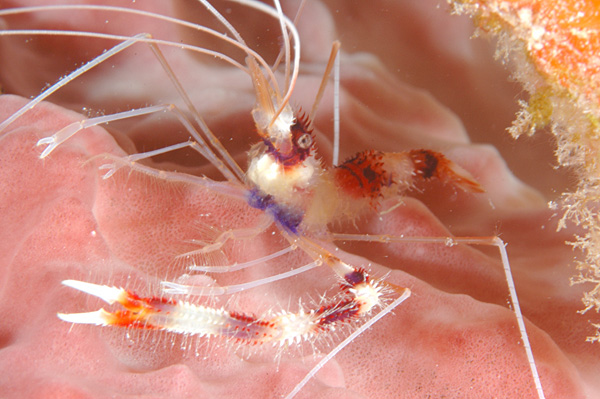
Banded Coral Shrimp

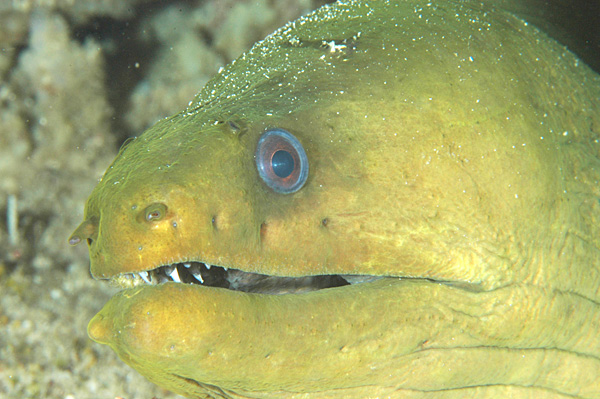
Green Moray Eel

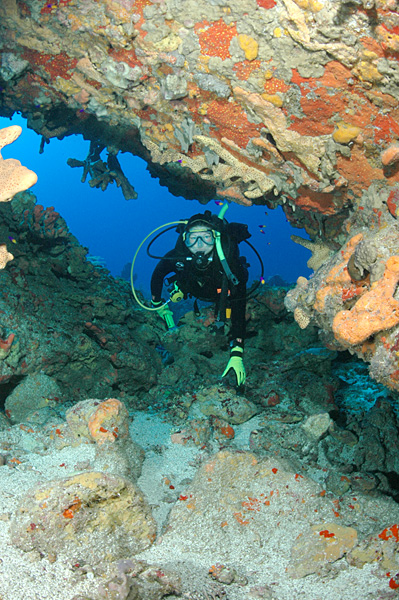
Diver in cave

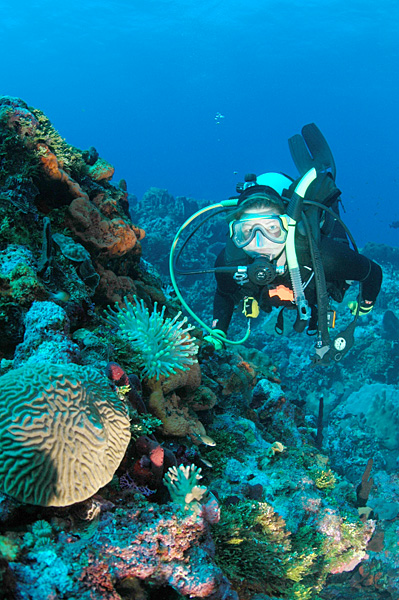
Diver and anemone

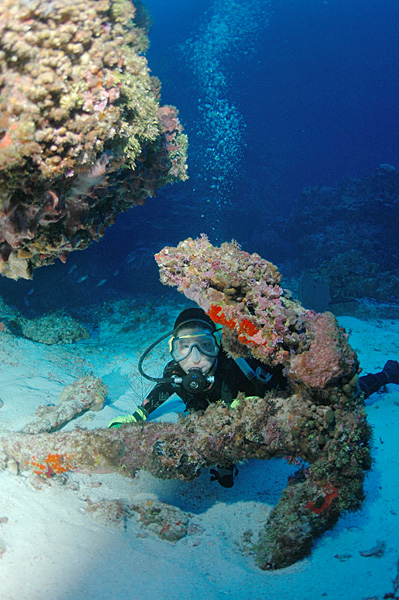
Diver and old anchor

== See also ==
- Timeline of Mayagüez, Puerto Rico
