= Mona Island Light =

Lighthouse on the island of Mona, Puerto Rico

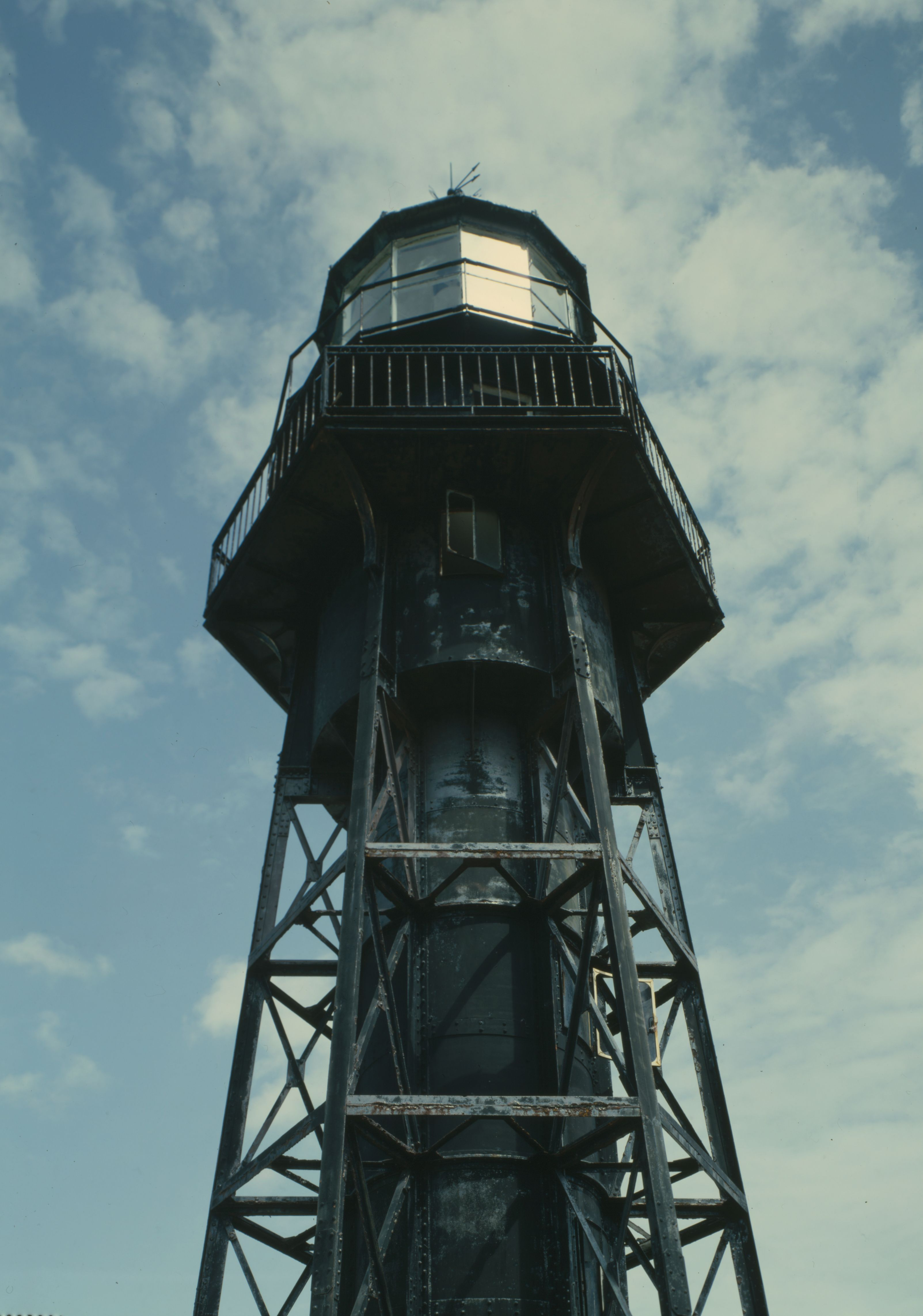
- Location: Mona Island, Mayagüez, Puerto Rico
- Coordinates: 18°5′5.2″N 67°51′4.4″W

Tower
- Constructed: 1900
- Foundation: Concrete
- Construction: Iron
- Automated: 1973
- Height: 12 m (39 ft)
- Shape: Skeletal with central cylinder
- Markings: Black
- Heritage: National Register of Historic Places listed place

Light
- First lit: 1900
- Deactivated: 1976
- Focal height: 98 m (322 ft)
- Lens: Second-order Fresnel
- Characteristic: Fl W 5s
- Faro de la Isla de la Mona
- U.S. National Register of Historic Places
- U.S. Historic district – Contributing property
- Puerto Rico Historic Sites and Zones
- Part of: Isla de Mona historic district (ID93001398)
- MPS: Lighthouse System of Puerto Rico TR
- NRHP reference No.: 81000689
- Added to NRHP: October 22, 1981

Mona Island Light, also known as Faro de la Isla de la Mona, is a historic lighthouse located on the island of Mona, Puerto Rico, in the Mona Passage between Puerto Rico and the Dominican Republic. It is the only lighthouse built of iron and steel in Puerto Rico. While some sources reported that the structure was designed by Gustav Eiffel, who also designed the Eiffel Tower in Paris, recent studies have shown that the tower was designed around 1885 by Spanish engineer Rafael Ravena.

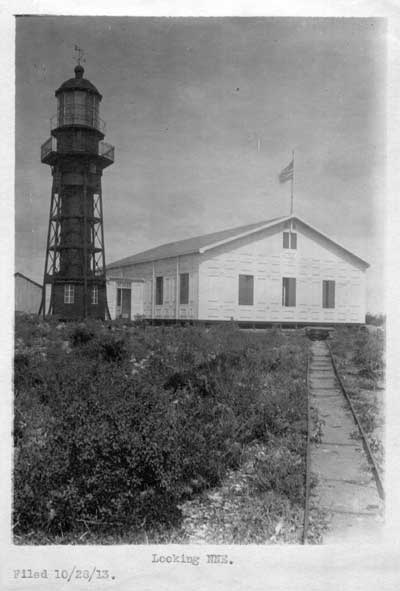
Mona Island Light, ca. 1913

It is the first of two lighthouses built by the U.S. government in Puerto Rico.

It was first lit in 1900 and automated in 1973. In 1976, the light was deactivated and replaced by a modern beacon. The structure has deteriorated severely since deactivation. The lighthouse is listed in "Frommer's 500 Places to See Before They Disappear" and Lighthouse Digest magazine described the condition of the lighthouse as dire: "This lighthouse has to be among the most endangered in the U.S. – along with being one of the most isolated – rusting away in the tropical heat and humidity."

== History ==
Two sets of plans were drawn up between 1885 and 1886 by Spanish engineer Rafael Ravena, working for the Spanish government, for a lighthouse on the eastern side of Mona Island to help mark Mona Passage, which runs between Puerto Rico and the Dominican Republic. One set of plans called for a massive masonry structure with twenty five rooms for three keepers, families and supplies and a light with a range of 22 miles. However this was not the design that was finally used, probably due to the very porous and brittle sandstone conditions of Mona Island.

The second set of plans called for an iron tower with a separate living quarters for one keeper and his family. This plan was approved in 1887, and work on the station started in the early 1890s. The lighthouse's materials were fabricated in France by Duclos & Cie. The U.S. government continued its construction after the Spanish–American War in 1898.

== Railway ==
The 1.1 miles (1.8 km) long narrow-gauge Mona Island Tramway had a gauge of 600 mm (1 ft 11 5/8 in). Its 231 ft long incline ran from the beach to a cave. Goods were carried through the cave, and then hauled by a stubborn donkey on a canopy-covered wagon along a 6000 ft long track to the lighthouse.

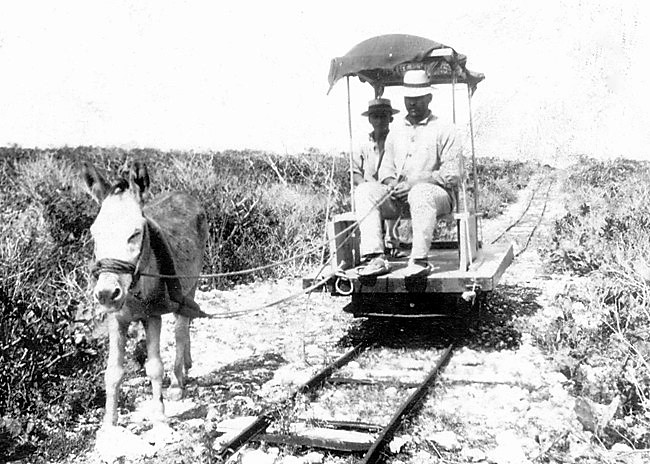
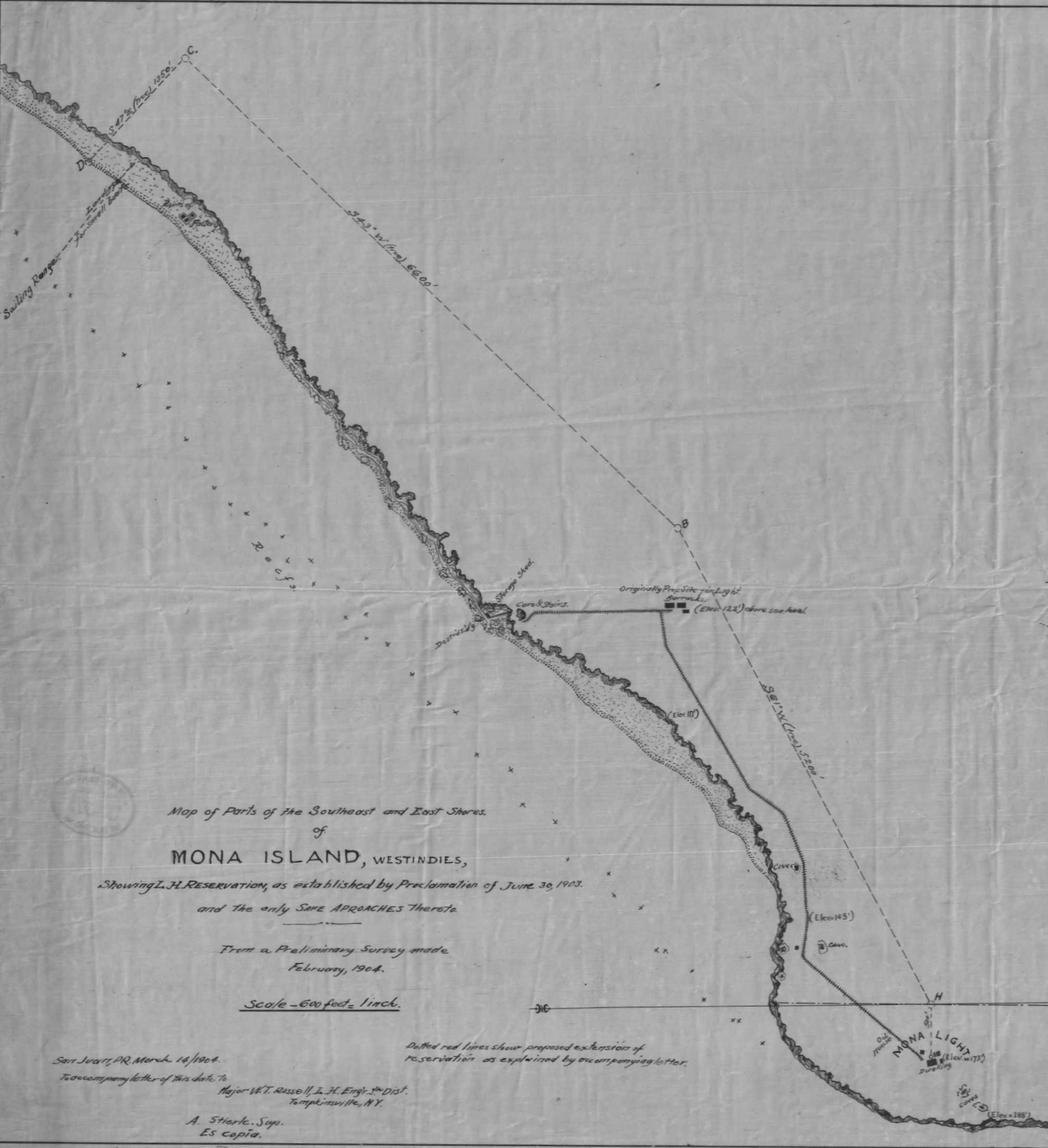
Donkey-drawn narrow gauge railway

== U.S. National Register of Historic Places ==
The lighthouse, as "Faro de la Isla de la Mona", was listed on the U.S. National Register of Historic Places in 1981.

== See also ==
- List of lighthouses in Puerto Rico
