= Isla de Mona =

Island of Puerto Rico

Mona Island
Nickname: Amona
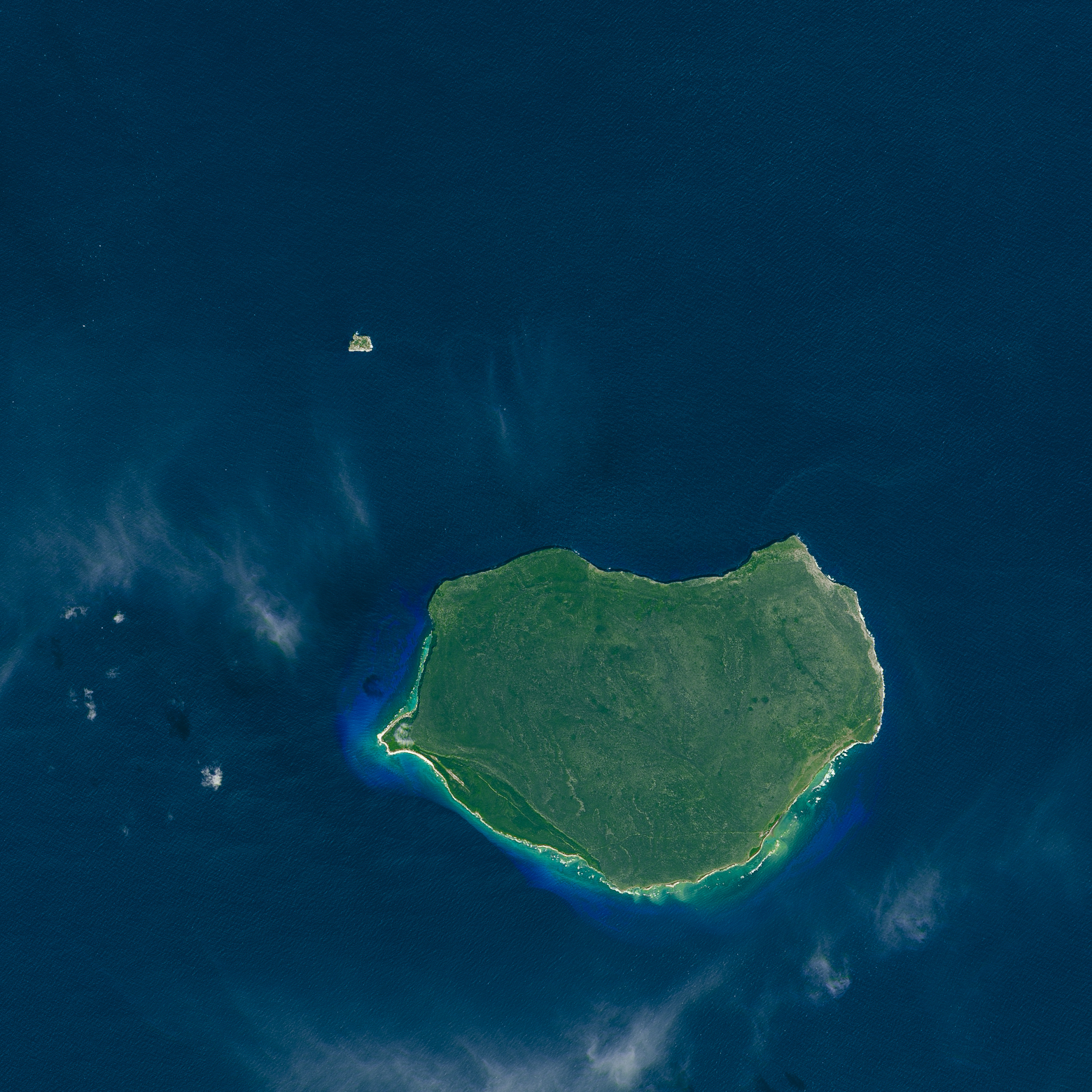
- Satellite image of Monito (top) and Mona (bottom), 2015

- Location within Puerto Rico Location within Lesser Antilles Location within the Caribbean Location within North America Location within Earth

Geography
- Location: Caribbean
- Coordinates: 18°5′12″N 67°53′22″W
- Archipelago: Puerto Rico
- Area: 57 km^{2} (22 sq mi)
- Length: 11 km (6.8 mi)
- Width: 7 km (4.3 mi)

Administration
- United States
- Commonwealth: Puerto Rico
- Municipality: Mayagüez
- Barrio: Isla de Mona e Islote Monito

Demographics
- Population: 5 (2010)

U.S. National Register of Historic Places

U.S. Historic district
- Designated: December 17, 1993
- Reference no.: 93001398

U.S. National Natural Landmark
- Designated: 1975

Mona Island (Spanish: Isla de Mona) is the third-largest island of the Puerto Rican archipelago, after the main island of Puerto Rico and Vieques. It is the largest of three islands in the Mona Passage, the strait between Hispaniola and Puerto Rico, with the others being Monito Island and Desecheo Island. It measures about 7 miles by 4 miles (11 km by 7 km), and lies 41 mi (66 km) west of Puerto Rico, of which it is administratively a part as one of two islands comprising the Isla de Mona e Islote Monito barrio in the municipality of Mayagüez.

The island is managed under the Mona and Monito Islands Nature Reserve (Reserva Natural Islas de Mona y Monito). There are no permanent inhabitants, as only rangers and biologists from the Puerto Rico Department of Natural and Environmental Resources temporarily reside on the island to manage visitors and take part in research projects. Along with the neighboring island of Monito, it forms part of the Mona and Monito Islands National Natural Landmark which recognizes and preserves the ecosystem of the islands as an outstanding example of diversity and natural history. The island is home to a number of endemic species such as the Mona ground iguana, and it is an important seabird area.

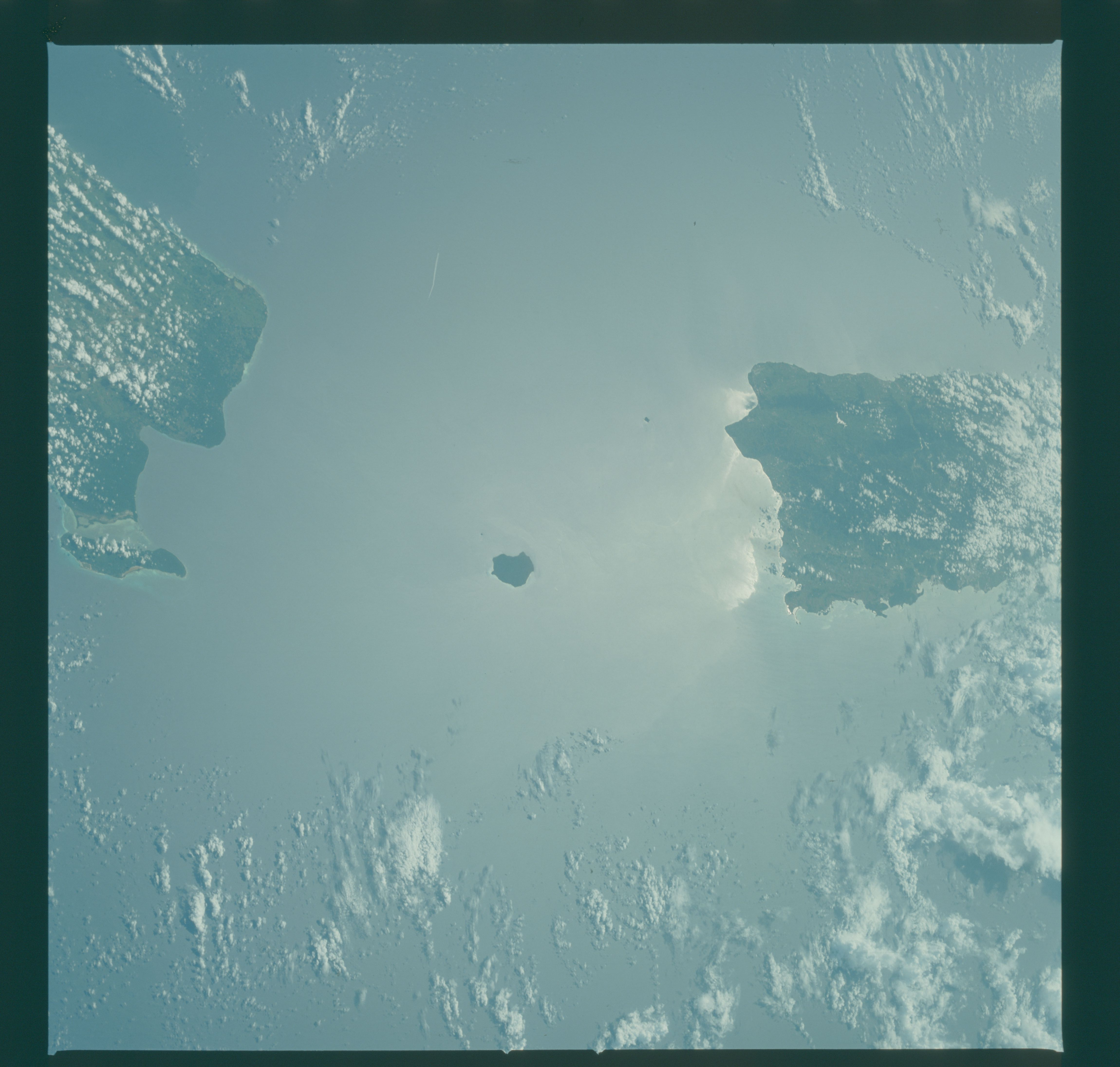
Satellite image of Mona Island between the Dominican Republic in Hispaniola (left) and the Puerto Rico mainland (right), 1983

== History ==
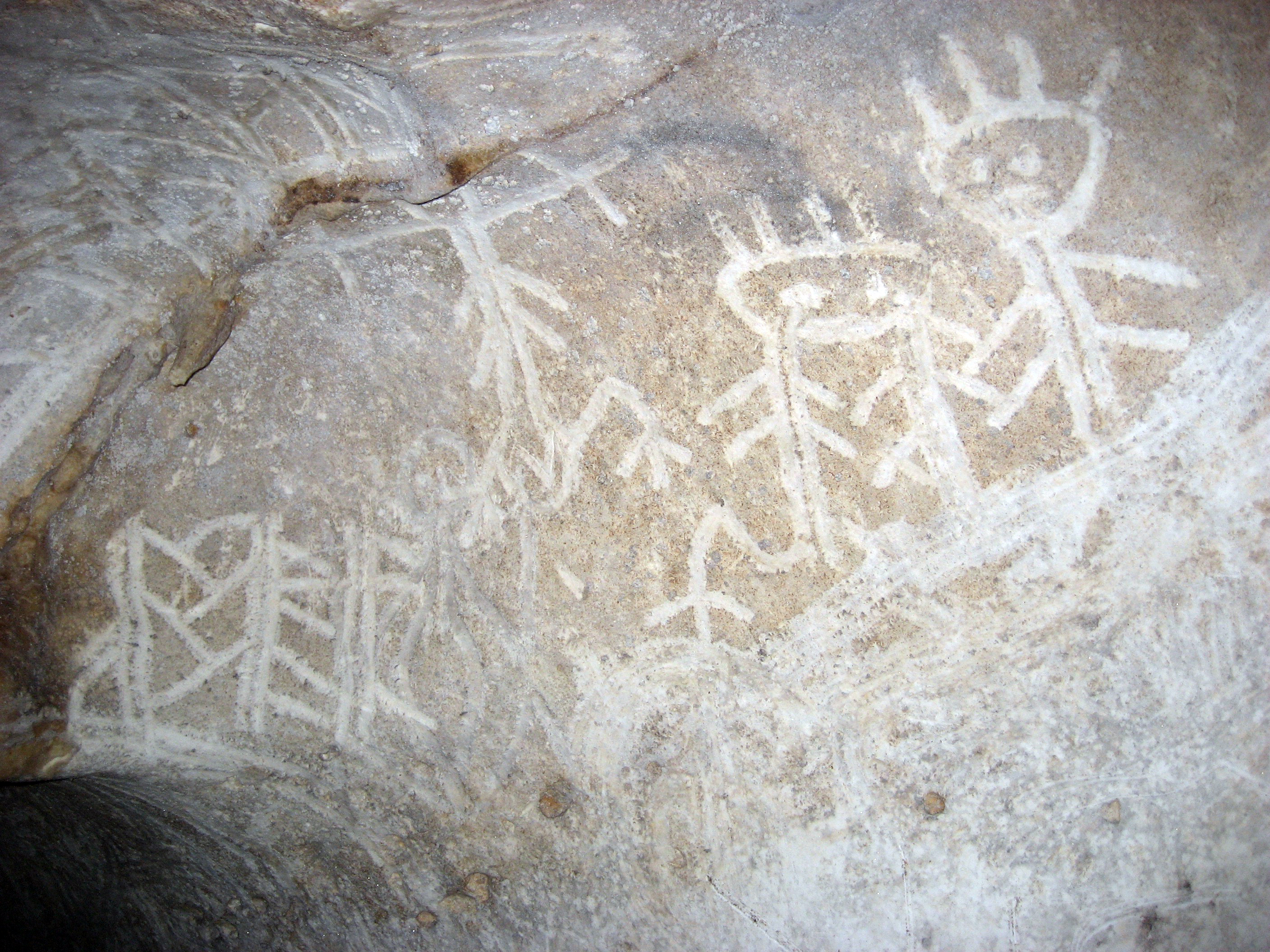
Taíno cave art in caves of Mona island

=== Pre-Columbian history ===
Mona Island is believed to have been originally settled by the Taíno in the 12th century or sooner. An archeological excavation during the 1980s discovered many Pre-Columbian objects on the island that helped support historians' theories of the island's first inhabitants. Stone tools found in a rock shelter have been dated to around 3000 BC. Much later the island was settled by the Taínos and remained so until the arrival of the Spanish in the 15th century.

=== Colonial period ===
On November 19, 1493, during his second voyage to the New World, Christopher Columbus encountered the island now known as Puerto Rico, which the natives called Borinquen (or Borikén), and which Columbus named San Juan Bautista (Saint John the Baptist). Within hours of setting foot in Puerto Rico, Columbus and his ships headed west to Hispaniola, where he expected to meet several crewmembers who had remained behind from his first voyage. As he left Puerto Rico, he reputedly became the first European to sight the island on September 24, 1494, which was claimed for Spain. The name Mona derives from the Taíno name Ámona, bestowed by the natives in honor of the ruling Cacique or chief of the island.

In 1502, Fray Nicolás de Ovando was sent to Isla de la Mona to keep an eye, from a safe distance, on the native revolts occurring in Hispaniola. With a group of 2,000 Spanish settlers, Ovando was left in charge of creating a permanent settlement on the island. Due to its small size and location, the island proved inadequate to accommodate such a large settlement, and food became scarce as shipments from Hispaniola and Puerto Rico were received infrequently.

In 1515, after some wrangling, Ferdinand II was able to reclaim the island from Diego Colón, Viceroy of the Indies. By then, Isla de la Mona was an important point of trade between Spain and the rest of Latin America, as well as a rest stop for the crews of boats carrying slaves. With his possession of the island, King Ferdinand II gave the resident Taínos two options if they wished to continue living on the island: they could work by fishing, making hammocks and cultivating plants, or they could become miners and help in the mining of guano and other minerals. Realizing that mining would require intense labor, the majority of inhabitants chose to work as fishermen and farmers. By accepting this option, they also were exempted from paying imposed taxes, and were able to avoid the hard labor many other natives endured in mines. In time, natives from other neighboring islands were brought to Mona Island to assist with labor.

After the death of Ferdinand II in 1516, ownership of the island was transferred to Cardenal Cisneros. The island changed ownership again in 1520, when Francisco de Barrionuevo became the island's new landlord. By 1524, Alonso Manso, bishop of Puerto Rico, had become interested in gaining personal wealth, and he accused Barrionuevo, among others, of various crimes under the Spanish justice system of the time. Because of this situation, Barrionuevo exiled himself to one of Spain's colonies in South America, taking many Taínos along with him, and leaving the island practically deserted.

By 1522, ships from other major sea powers such as England, France, and the Netherlands began to arrive at Isla de la Mona to replenish supplies for their transatlantic voyages. The island also provided a refuge from which they, as well as pirates, could attack and plunder Spanish galleons.

In 1561, during an audience held in Santo Domingo, it was recommended that Isla de la Mona should become a part of that colony (which at the time occupied the entirety of Hispaniola). The reasons offered were simply that the island was closer to Santo Domingo (presently the Dominican Republic) than to Puerto Rico, and that it had a small population which could help the colony's economy in overall agricultural production. However, the petition was turned down and the island continued to remain politically part of Puerto Rico.

In 1583, the Spanish archbishop of Puerto Rico received royal permission to bring Christianity to Mona Island. However, by this time most Taínos remaining on the island had either died or fled to mainland Puerto Rico due to repeated raiding by European (especially French) ships. From the end of the 16th century up until the mid-19th century the island was largely abandoned by the colonial authorities. It seems to have been sporadically inhabited, although records from this period are somewhat sketchy. It continued to be used as a refuge by pirates and privateers, including the notorious Captain Kidd who hid out there in 1699.

The island's circumstances changed in the mid-19th century when it became the site of commercial guano mining operations. Various companies were granted licenses to extract the bat and seagull guano (a valuable fertilizer and key strategic commodity for the production of gunpowder) from the island's caves. Mining continued until 1927.

=== 20th century ===
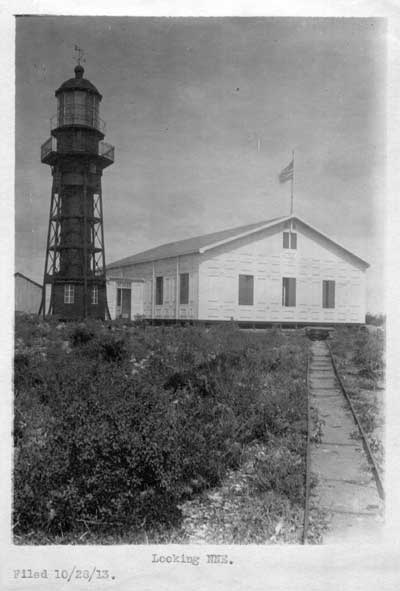
Mona Island Lighthouse and Mona Island Tramway, 1913

With the 1898 Treaty of Paris, Isla de la Mona, along with the rest of Puerto Rico, was handed to the United States by Spain. The population of Mona Isla was six at the time. Within two years of occupation, the Mona Island Light, left in an unfinished state since the beginning of the Spanish–American War, was completed and began operation. The lighthouse was not, as commonly believed, designed by Gustave Eiffel, but by the Spanish engineer Rafael Ravena in 1886. It was accessible by the Mona Island Tramway from the beach and remained in continuous operation until 1976 when it was replaced by a newer automated light near the center of the island.

On December 22, 1919, the island was declared an Insular Forest of Puerto Rico, under the auspices of the U.S. Forest Law No. 22.

During Prohibition the island had a history of smuggling, with its geographic location making it a prime location for rum runners to smuggle rum, bourbon, and other liquor. In 1923, a stash of liquor, drugs, and perfumes, reportedly from the French islands of Martinique and Saint Martin and worth US$75,000, was found in a cave by customs officials.

In 1942, at the height of World War II, German submarine U-156 fired 30 shells from its deck gun at the southern coast of the island. The crew of the Nazi vessel suspected that Camp Cofresí, a camp that the Civilian Conservation Corps were using as the base of a reforestation effort, could be an unmarked military facility. There were no significant losses, but the incident was one of the few military strikes of the war in the Caribbean, which was also the focus of a German/Italian campaign against Allied resource shipping. Prior to this, the Nazi U-boat had sunk nineteen ships in the region including one named Del Plata in Puerto Rican waters. On June 4, 1942, the oil tanker MV C.O. Stillman was sunk by the German submarine U-68 41 nautical miles (76 km) southwest of Isla de Mona. From 1945 to 1955 Mona Island was leased to the U.S. Air Force as a military exercise area.

Historical population
Census	Pop.	Note	%±
1900	6		—
1940	156		—
1950	3		−98.1%
1960	0		−100.0%
1990	0		—
2000	0		—
2010	5		—
U.S. Decennial Census; 1899 (shown as 1900) 1910-1930; 1930-1950 1980-2000 2010

Since 1941 the island has also been used for camping and hunting goats and wild boar. In 1960 a small ranger post was established to monitor the island, operated by the Puerto Rico Department of Natural and Environmental Resources.

In July 1972 the Puerto Rico Environmental Quality Board, because of growing interest in the development of the islands, made a full scientific assessment of Mona and Monito using a local team of volunteer scientists. A two-volume report with maps of natural and historic features was produced. It evaluated the climate, geology and mineral resources, soils, water resources, archaeology, vegetation, animals and insects, and pelagic life around the island. Shortly thereafter geotechnical and bathymetric studies were conducted by engineering firms to determine the feasibility of using Mona as a deep-water terminal for transferring oil from supertankers to smaller tankers which would continue to the mainland US; this plan was never implemented.

In 1981, the Mona Island Light was listed on the U.S. National Register of Historic Places as Faro de la Isla de la Mona.

On February 15, 1985, the passenger-cargo ferry MV A Regina ran aground on a reef on the southeastern side of Mona Island. While there were no deaths nor serious injuries, 143 passengers and 72 crew members landed on Mona Island to await rescue. The wreck of the ship was removed from the reef in 1990. The ship MV Jireh ran aground there in 2012.

In 1993, the island, inscribed as Isla de la Mona, was listed as a historic district on the National Register of Historic Places. The historic district consists of eight contributing buildings (including the lighthouse), nine prehistoric and historic archaeological sites (including several ceremonial ball courts or bateyes), two guano industrial ruins, a roadway and a cistern.

=== 21st century ===
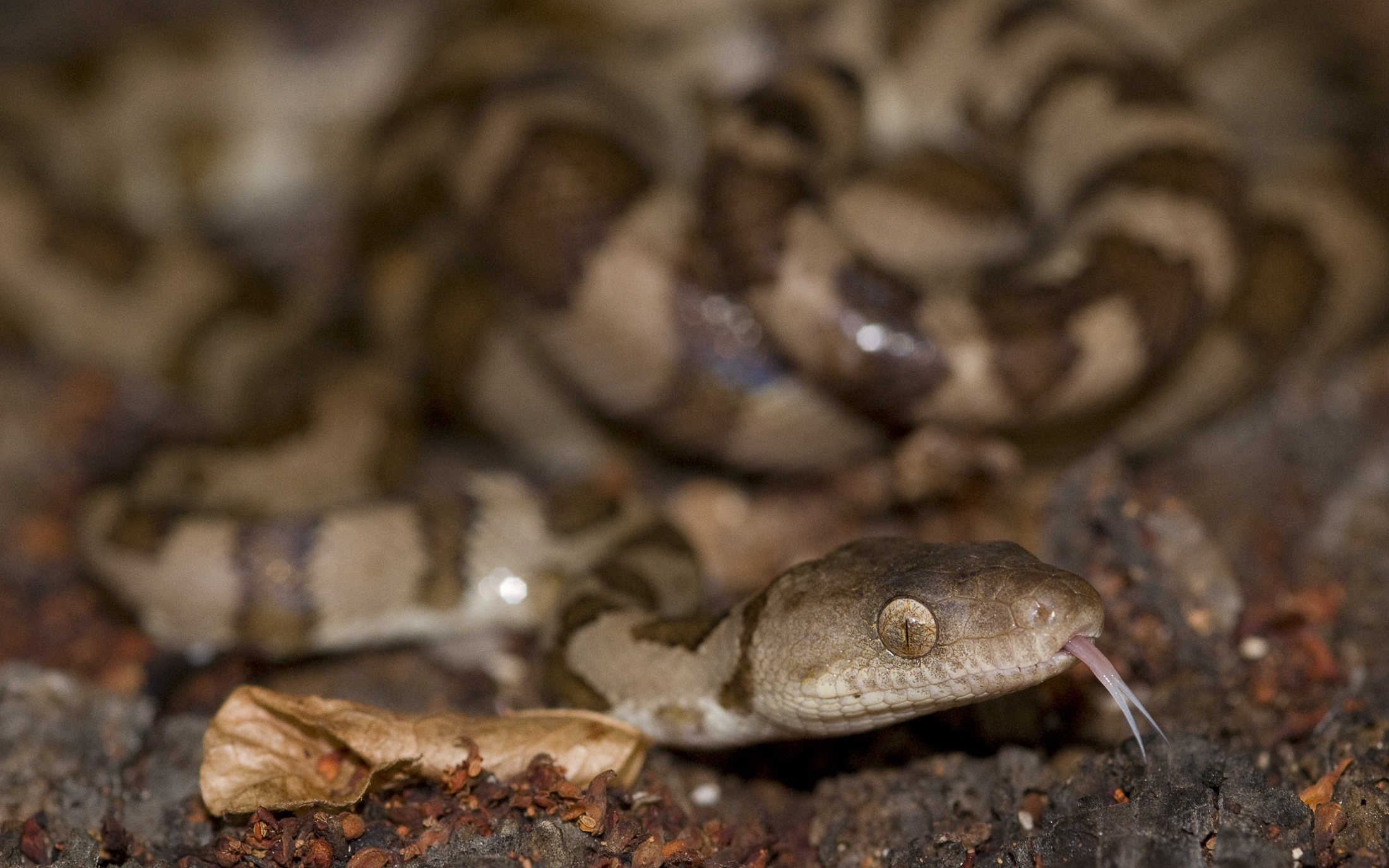
Mona Island boa

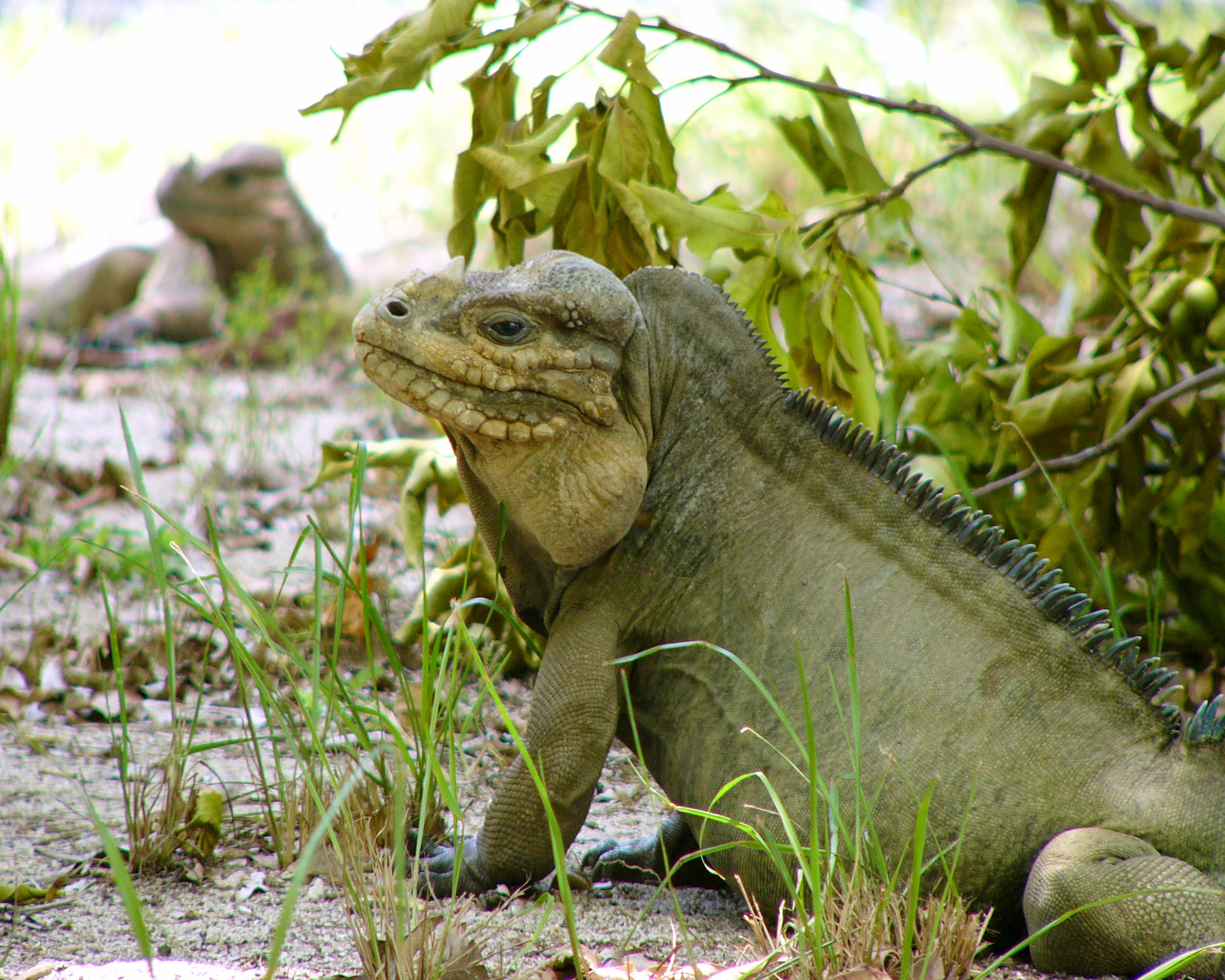
Mona ground iguana, endemic to the island

The island presently serves as a retreat for Puerto Ricans and nature enthusiasts from all around the world, and has also become a popular destination for Puerto Rican Boy and Girl Scouts. Due to the islands' unique topography, ecology and location, Mona, Desecheo and Monito have been nicknamed "The Galápagos Islands of the Caribbean". Scientists, ecologists, and students have visited Mona Island to explore its distinct ecosystem, which includes the endemic Mona Ground Iguana. The island is also home to many cave drawings that were left behind by the island's original inhabitants. Remains of the guano mining industry can also be seen.

An FAA-certified airport that can handle small aircraft was built by the Puerto Rican government. This airport has no ICAO or IATA code. The United States Coast Guard is able to provide transportation with helicopter flights from Rafael Hernández Airport in Aguadilla, to help with medicines and first aid equipment; they also fly whenever an emergency requiring hospitalization occurs. Private and commercial planes require a special permit issued by the Puerto Rico Department of Natural Resources to use the airport's facilities.

The most common form of transportation is by private yacht, though commercial excursions are available from Cabo Rojo for small groups of up to twelve people traveling together.

Hunting is permitted in season to control the population growth of non-indigenous species (goats and wild boars) because they can represent a threat to various endangered species. The hunting season usually commences in December and ends in April. Camping is allowed from May through November.

In recent years, the island has become a major drop-off point especially for Dominicans, as well as Haitians and Cubans trying to reach Puerto Rico illegally. As a U.S. Commonwealth, Puerto Rico is seen by many undocumented migrants as a stepping stone to the United States, but they are usually deported immediately.

Due to the island's natural and cultural importance there has been interest in seeking world heritage status for Mona as a UNESCO World Heritage Site by the Puerto Rican government.

On occasion, people (trying to reach Puerto Rico illegally by boat) travel through the Mona Passage and are rescued near Mona Island.

== Geography ==
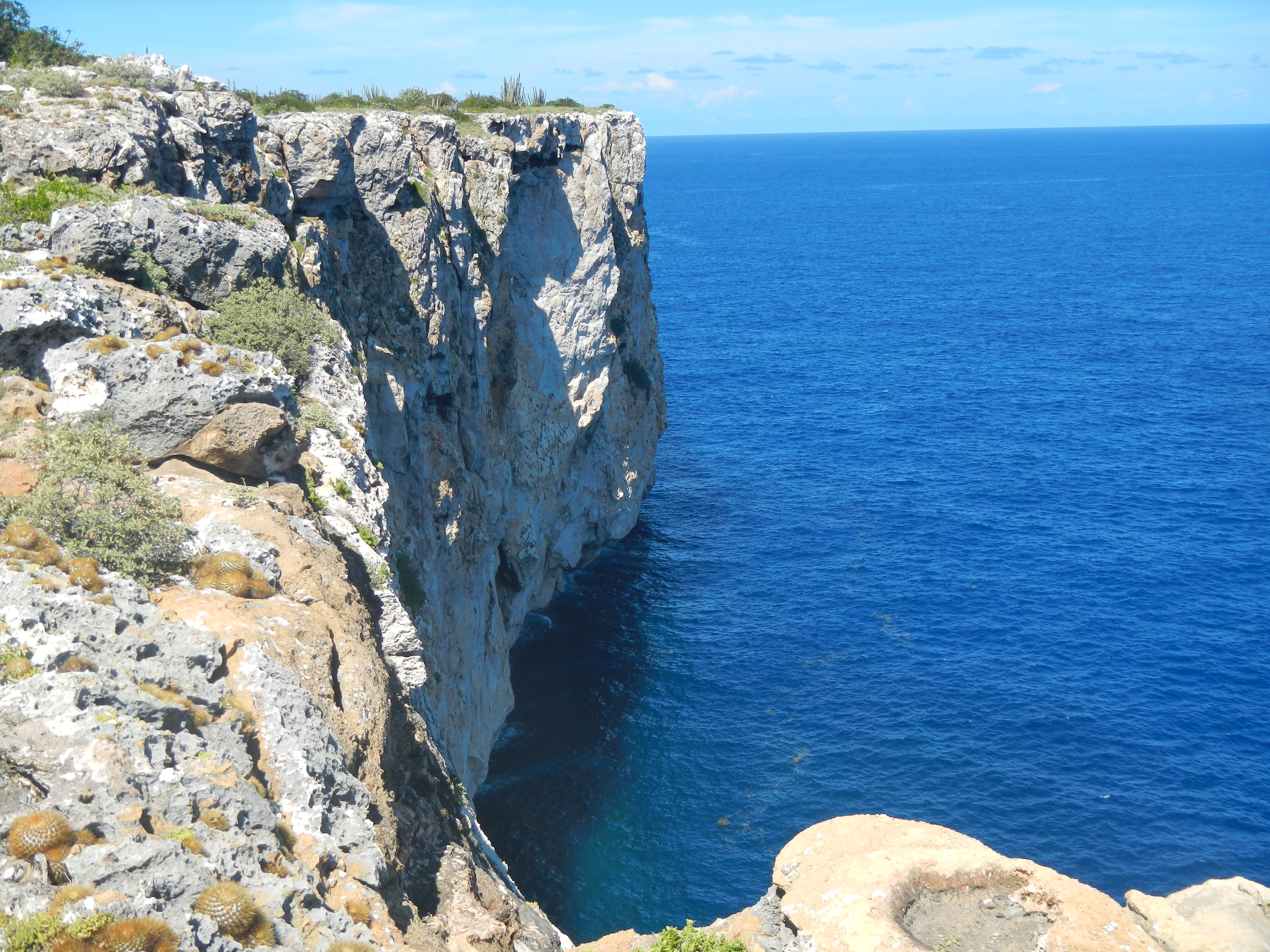
Mona is a mainly flat plateau surrounded by sea cliffs.

Mona has an area of about 22 sq mi (57 km^{2}) and lies 41 mi (66 km) west of the main island of Puerto Rico, 38 mi (61 km) east of the Dominican Republic, and 30 mi (48 km) southwest of Desecheo Island, another island in the Mona Passage.

Mona has been designated an ecological reserve by the Puerto Rican government and is not permanently inhabited. The US census of 2000 reported six housing units, but a population of zero. The island is a barrio of the municipality of Mayagüez, together with Monito Island 3.1 mi (5 km) northwest (Isla de Mona e Islote Monito barrio). This is the largest ward of Mayagüez by area, and the only one without permanent population. The total land area of both islands in the barrio is about 21.98 square miles (56.93 km^{2}) (Mona Island 21.924 square miles [56.783 km^{2}] and nearby Monito Island 0.057 square miles [0.147 km^{2}]), and it comprises 28.3 percent of the total land area of the municipality of Mayagüez. Desecheo Island, 30 mi (49 km) to the northeast, is part of Sabanetas barrio.

Mona is a mainly flat plateau surrounded by sea cliffs. It is composed of dolomite and limestone with many caves found throughout. With an arid climate and untouched by human development, many endemic species inhabit the island, such as the Mona ground iguana (Cyclura cornuta stejnegeri). Its topography, ecology, and modern history are similar to that of Navassa Island, a small limestone island located in the Jamaica Channel, between Jamaica and Haiti.

=== Caves ===
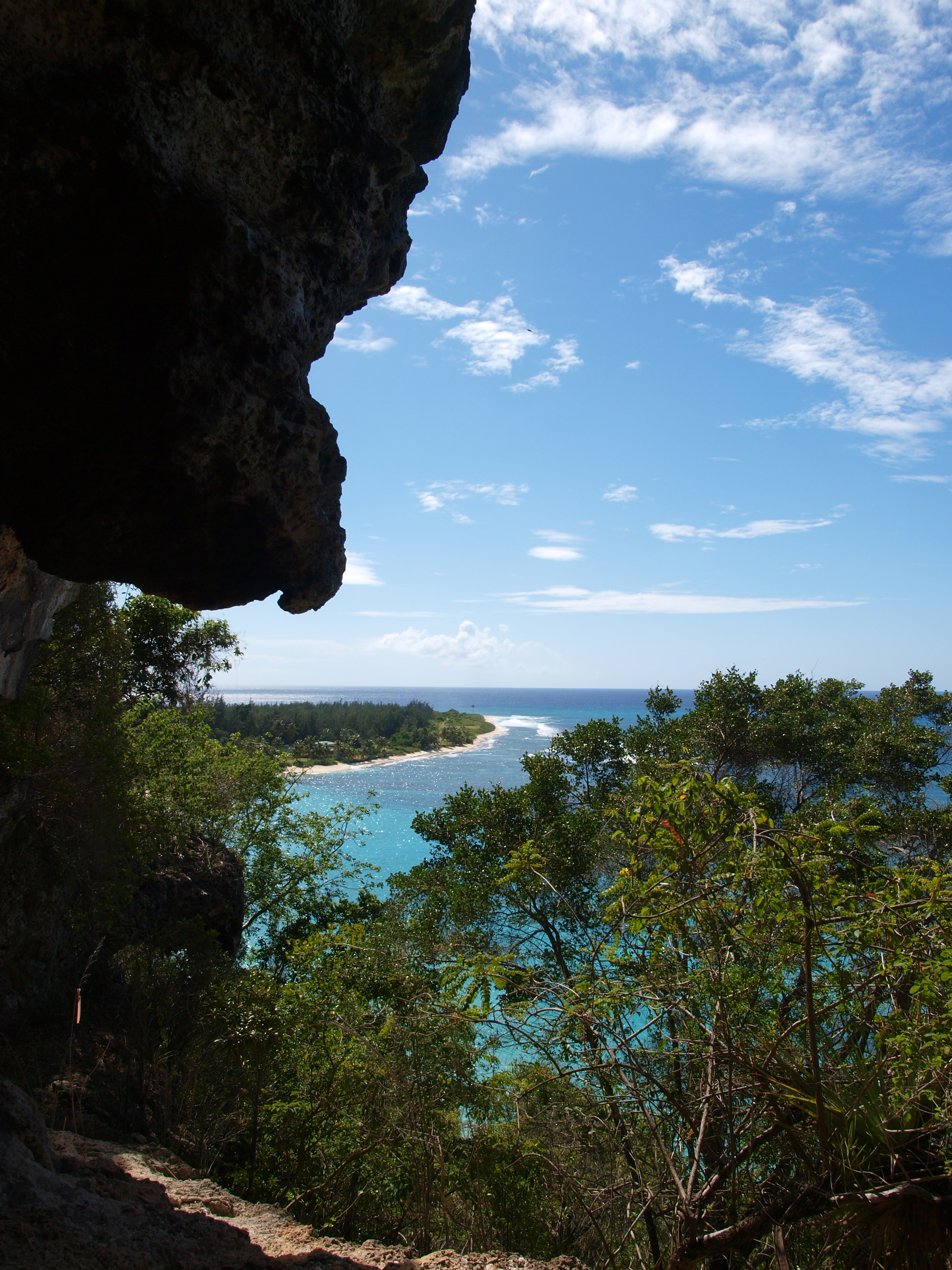
Looking out from Cueva del Diamante

There are around 200 caves, including El gato, La esperanza, La negra, Los ingleses, El rifle, El toro, Del norte, Ataúd, Nuevos Lirios and Gallinas on Isla de Mona, with thousands of examples of native art, marks and later on, graffiti.

=== Climate ===
The Isla de Mona has a tropical savanna climate (Aw according to the Köppen climate classification), with a dry season and wet season and the temperature being warm year-round. The average annual mean is 26.6 °C (79.9 °F), an average annual high is 31.7 °C (89.1 °F) and an average annual low is 21.5 °C (70.7 °F). August, the warmest month, has a mean of 28.3 °C (82.9 °F) and an average high of 33.8 °C (92.8 °F), while the coolest month, January, has a mean of 24.8 °C (76.6 °F) and an average low of 20.3 °C (68.5 °F), although February has a lower average low at 20.0 °C (68.0 °F).

On July 2, 1996, the Isla de Mona recorded a temperature of 40.0 °C (104.0 °F), which is the highest temperature to have ever been recorded in Puerto Rico.

Isla de Mona receives 986 millimetres (38.8 in) of precipitation annually over 126.5 precipitation days. Due to tropical cyclones, autumn is the wettest season, while winter is the driest. The wettest month is May, which receives 125 millimetres (4.9 in) of precipitation on average. October has 12.7 precipitation days on average, which is the highest of any month. January is the driest month, receiving 41 millimetres (1.6 in), while April has the least precipitation days (8.3).

Climate data for Mona Island, Puerto Rico (1991–2020 normals, extremes 1980–2010)
Month	Jan	Feb	Mar	Apr	May	Jun	Jul	Aug	Sep	Oct	Nov	Dec	Year
Record high °F (°C)	96 (36)	96 (36)	97 (36)	99 (37)	98 (37)	103 (39)	104 (40)	105 (41)	102 (39)	97 (36)	98 (37)	96 (36)	105 (41)
Mean maximum °F (°C)	88.3 (31.3)	88.3 (31.3)	90.1 (32.3)	93.0 (33.9)	93.4 (34.1)	94.6 (34.8)	94.9 (34.9)	95.7 (35.4)	94.8 (34.9)	93.6 (34.2)	92.4 (33.6)	89.4 (31.9)	96.4 (35.8)
Mean daily maximum °F (°C)	84.8 (29.3)	85.7 (29.8)	85.9 (29.9)	88.5 (31.4)	90.2 (32.3)	92.1 (33.4)	92.3 (33.5)	92.8 (33.8)	91.9 (33.3)	91.0 (32.8)	87.6 (30.9)	86.1 (30.1)	89.1 (31.7)
Daily mean °F (°C)	76.6 (24.8)	76.8 (24.9)	77.3 (25.2)	78.8 (26.0)	80.6 (27.0)	82.4 (28.0)	82.5 (28.1)	83.0 (28.3)	82.2 (27.9)	81.4 (27.4)	79.6 (26.4)	77.5 (25.3)	79.9 (26.6)
Mean daily minimum °F (°C)	68.5 (20.3)	68.0 (20.0)	68.7 (20.4)	69.2 (20.7)	71.1 (21.7)	72.8 (22.7)	72.6 (22.6)	73.3 (22.9)	72.4 (22.4)	71.9 (22.2)	71.5 (21.9)	68.9 (20.5)	70.7 (21.5)
Mean minimum °F (°C)	64.6 (18.1)	64.8 (18.2)	65.2 (18.4)	65.3 (18.5)	67.1 (19.5)	69.4 (20.8)	68.2 (20.1)	69.4 (20.8)	69.1 (20.6)	69.6 (20.9)	67.1 (19.5)	66.3 (19.1)	61.5 (16.4)
Record low °F (°C)	57 (14)	58 (14)	58 (14)	61 (16)	57 (14)	61 (16)	57 (14)	60 (16)	61 (16)	61 (16)	59 (15)	60 (16)	57 (14)
Average precipitation inches (mm)	1.61 (41)	1.64 (42)	2.17 (55)	2.43 (62)	4.92 (125)	2.50 (64)	2.30 (58)	4.22 (107)	4.74 (120)	4.49 (114)	3.82 (97)	3.99 (101)	38.83 (986)
Average precipitation days (≥ 0.01 in)	10.6	8.3	8.8	8.3	11.6	9.3	11.8	11.2	10.9	12.7	12.5	10.5	126.5
Source 1: NOAA
Source 2: XMACIS2 (mean maxima/minima 1991–2020)

=== Land cover ===
Four types of land cover can be identified:

- Cactus (4.35 square miles) (11.27 km^{2})
- Highland forest (15.55 square miles) (40.28 km^{2})
- Central Depression forest (0.57 square miles) (1.47 km^{2})
- Coastal forest (1.46 square miles) (3.77 km^{2})

=== Beaches ===
Mona Island hosts a large and increasing hawksbill sea turtle (Eretmochelys imbricata) rookery with over 1,500 clutches laid annually on its beaches. The island is recognized as one of the principal sites for hawksbill nesting in the Wider Caribbean and Western Atlantic region, along with Mexico (Yucatán Peninsula beaches), Barbados, Panama (Bocas del Toro), and Brazil.

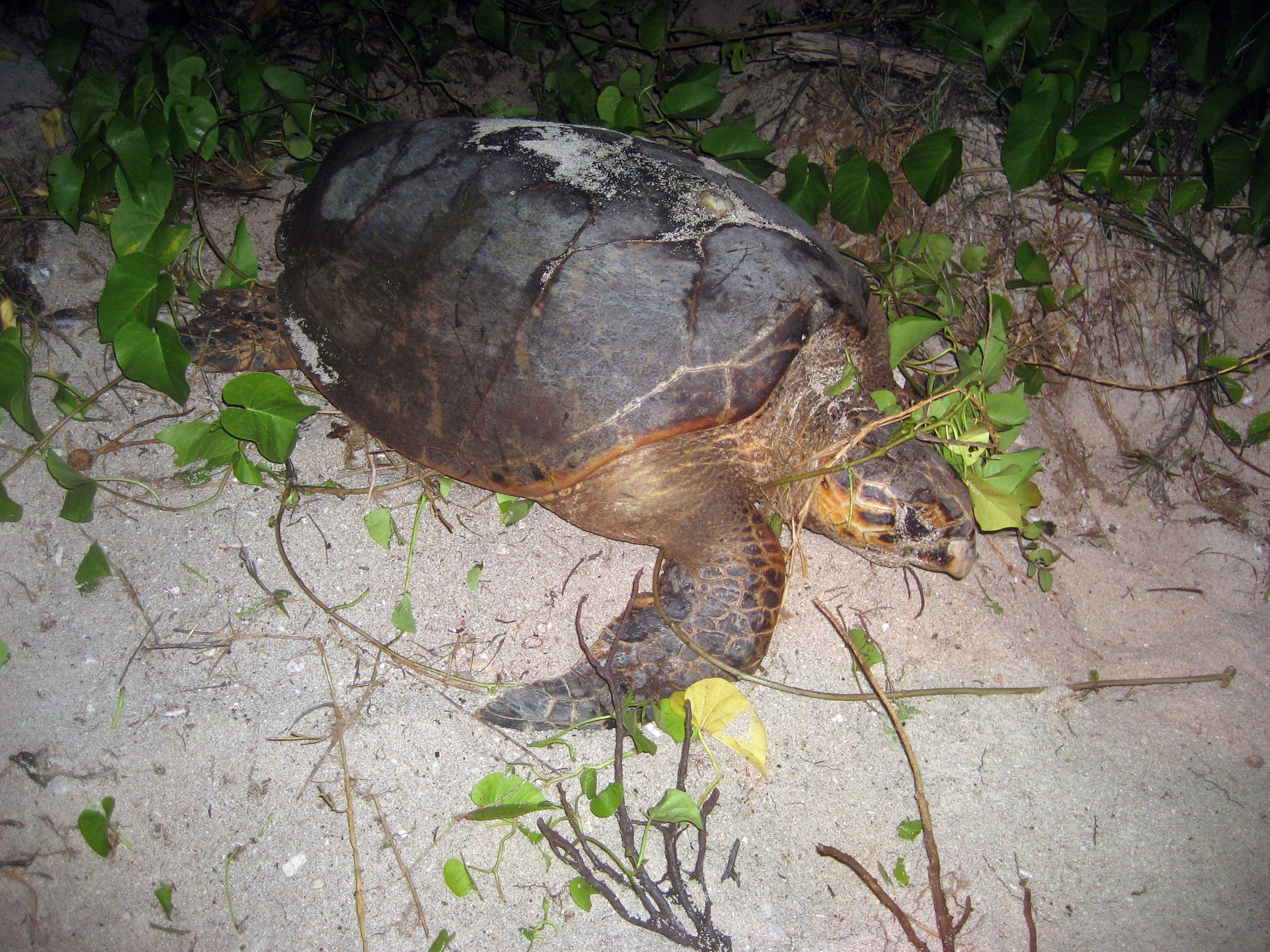
Critically endangered hawksbill turtle

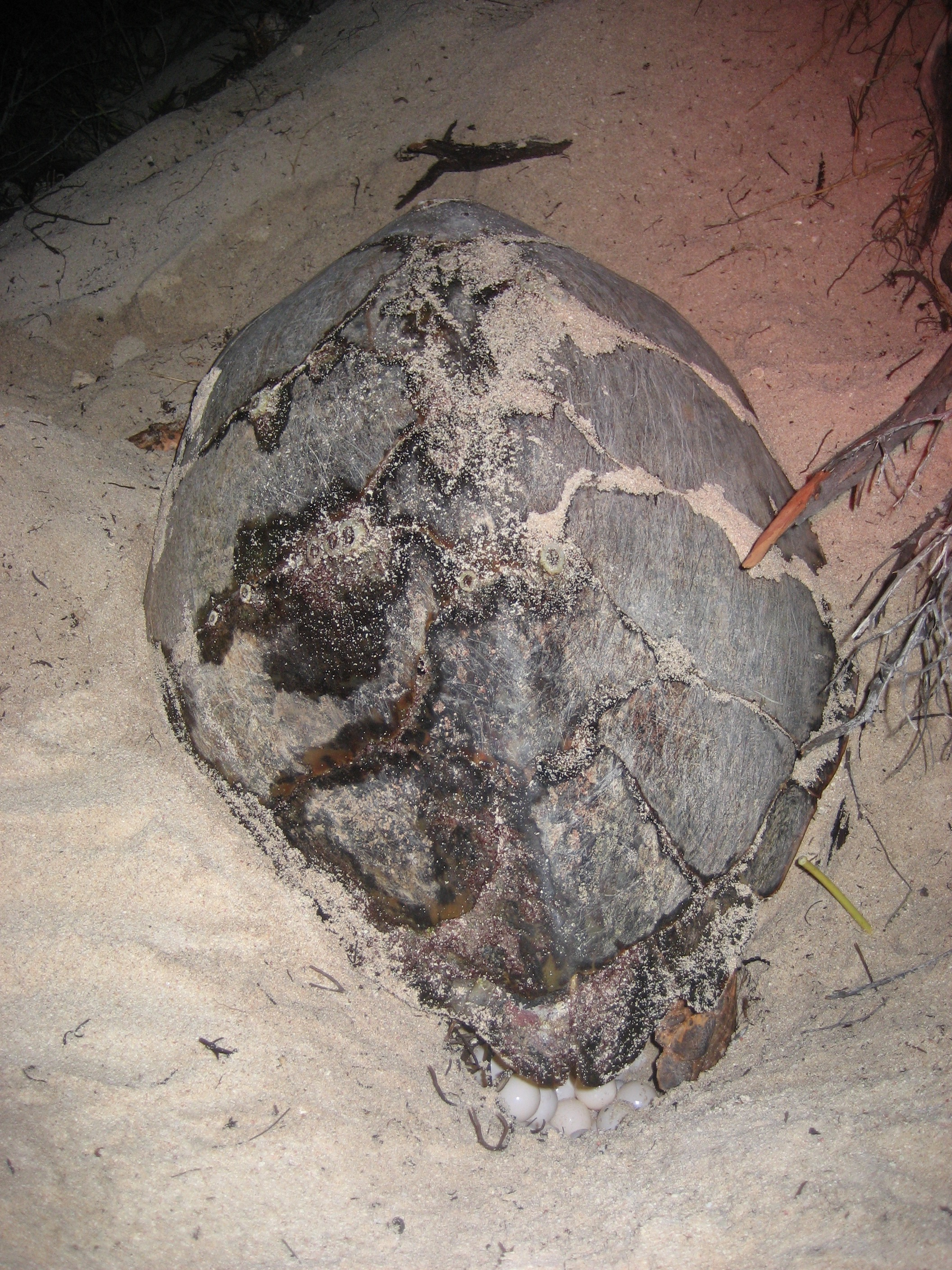
Nesting hawksbill

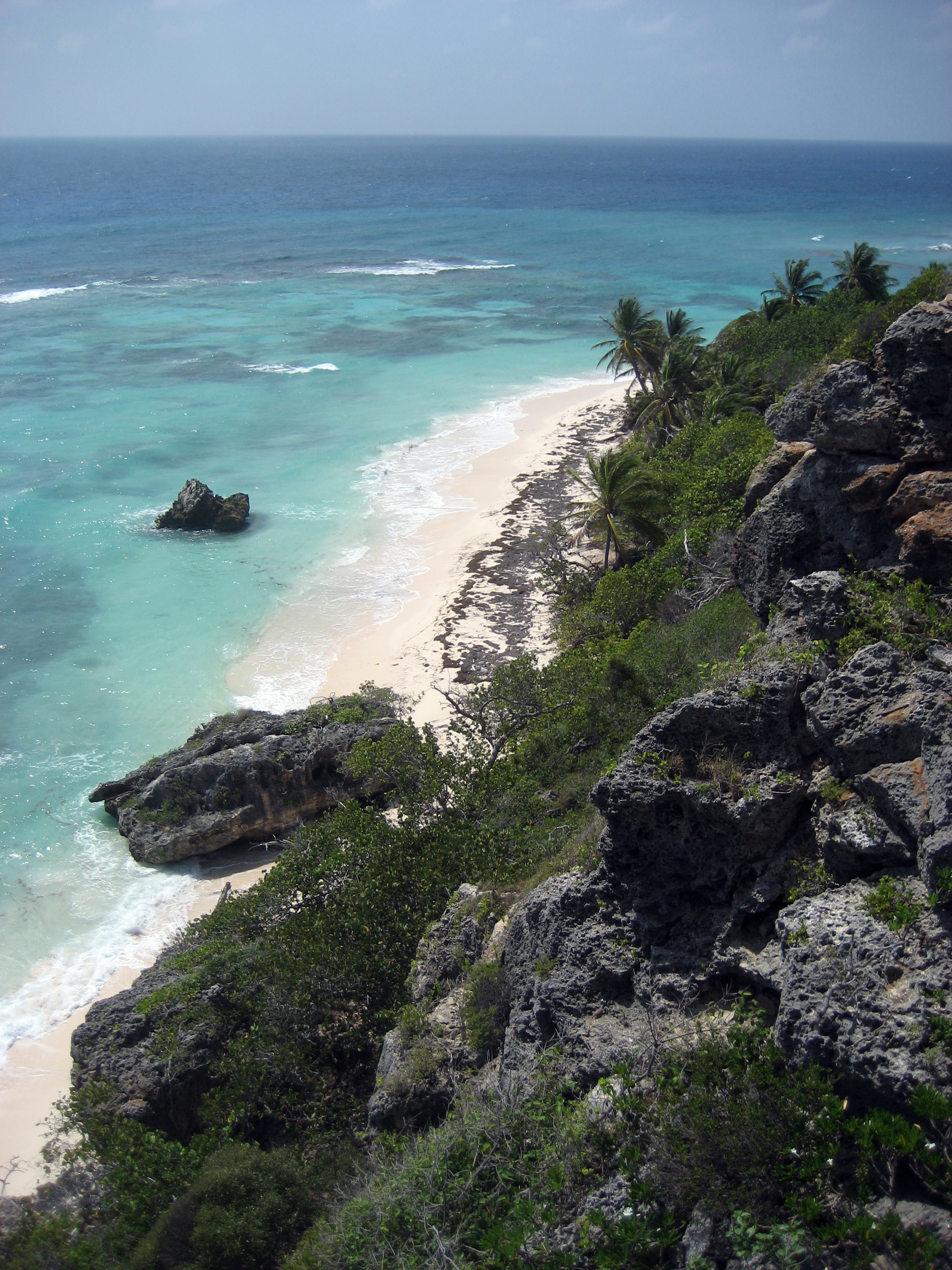
Playa Escalera

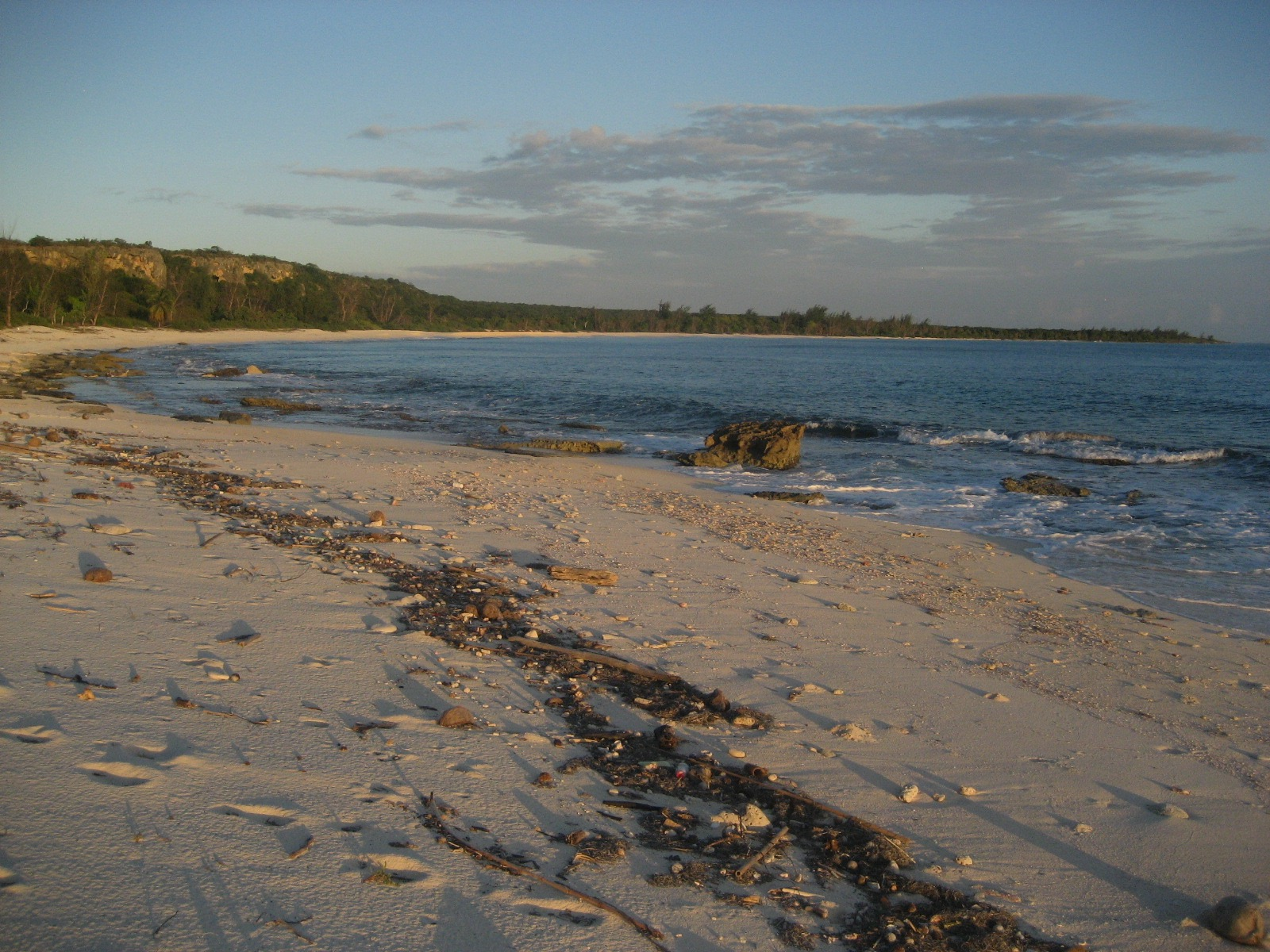
Playa Mujeres

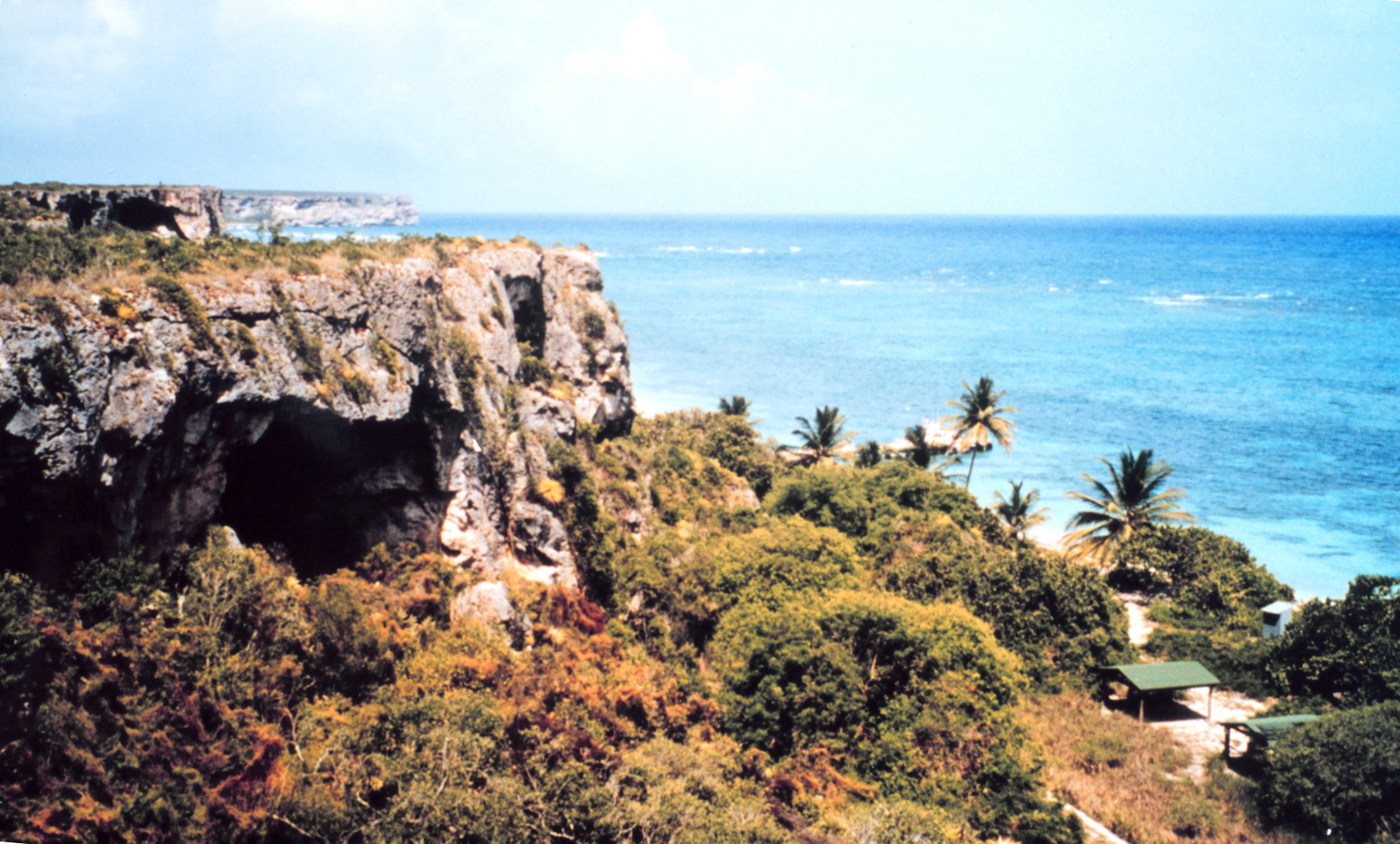
Playa Pájaros

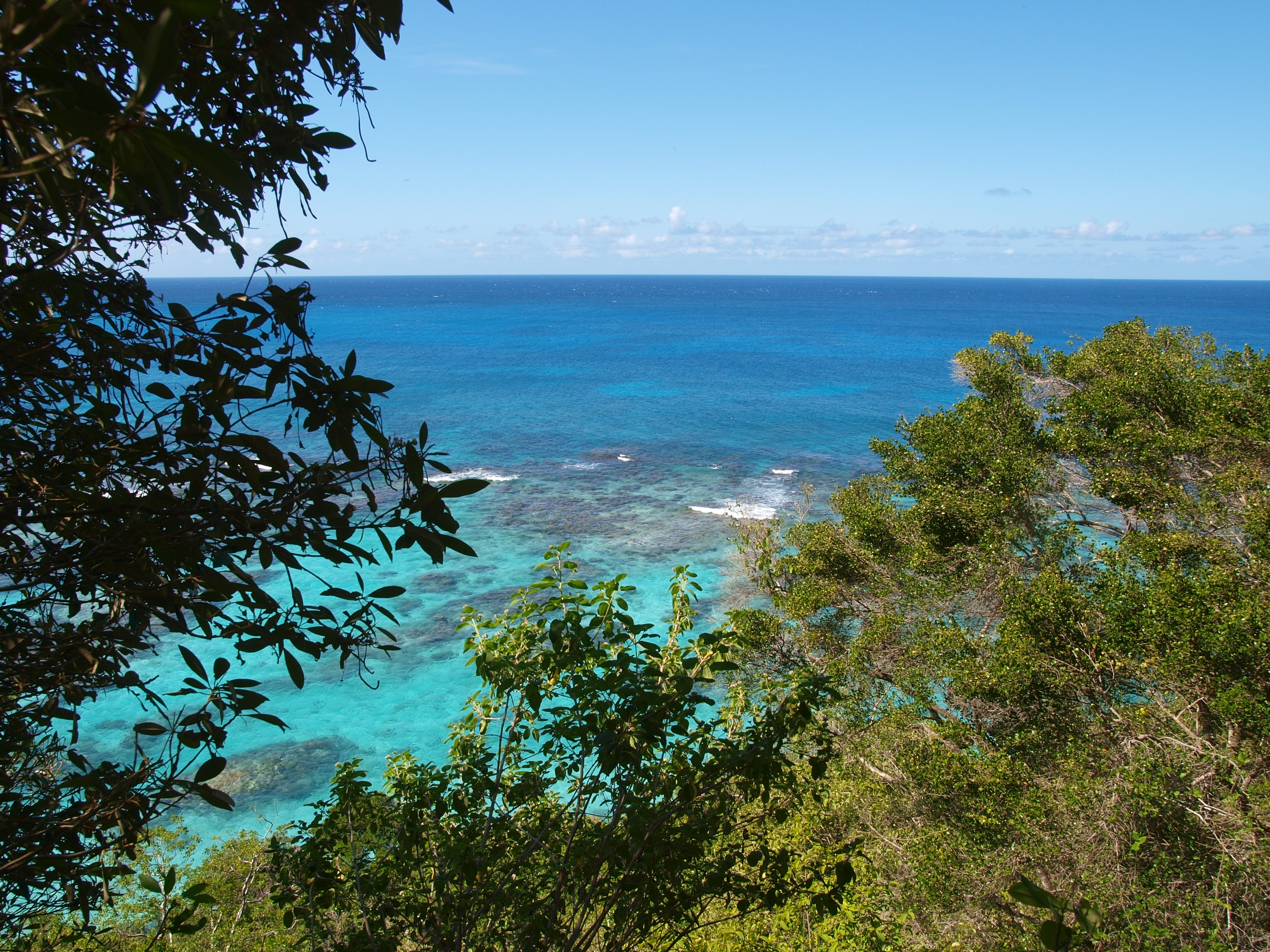
Playa Sardinera

Southeast beaches

- Playa Escalera
- Playa Pájaros
- Playa Brava
- Playa Coco
- Playa Caigo

Southwest beaches

- Playa Uvero-1
- Playa Uvero-2
- Playa U-8
- Playa U-1
- Playa Carabinero
- Playa Mujeres
- Playa Carite

Western beaches

- Playa Sardinera
- Playa Carmelitas

== Gallery ==
Scenes around Isla de Mona:

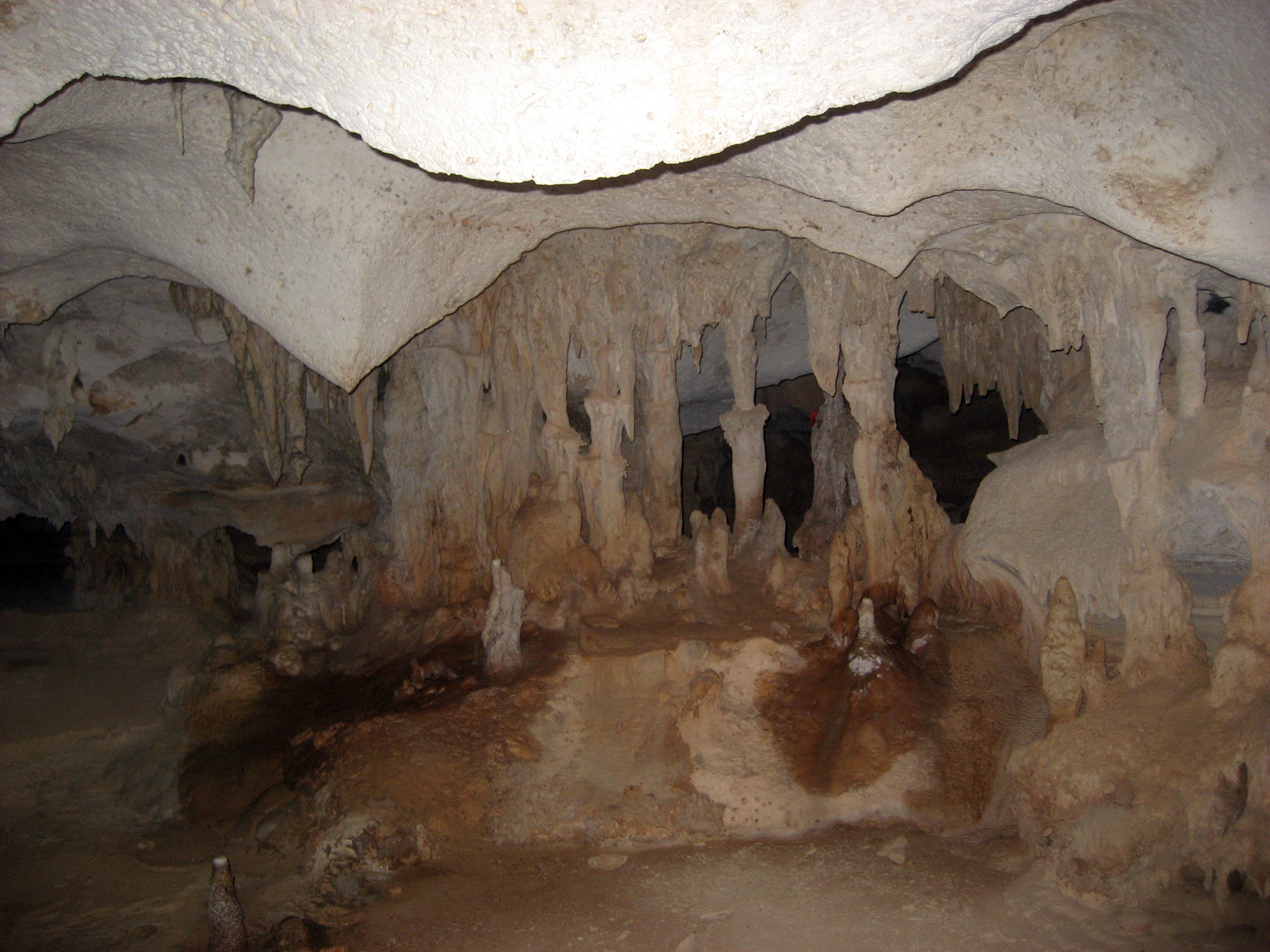
Mona Island cave

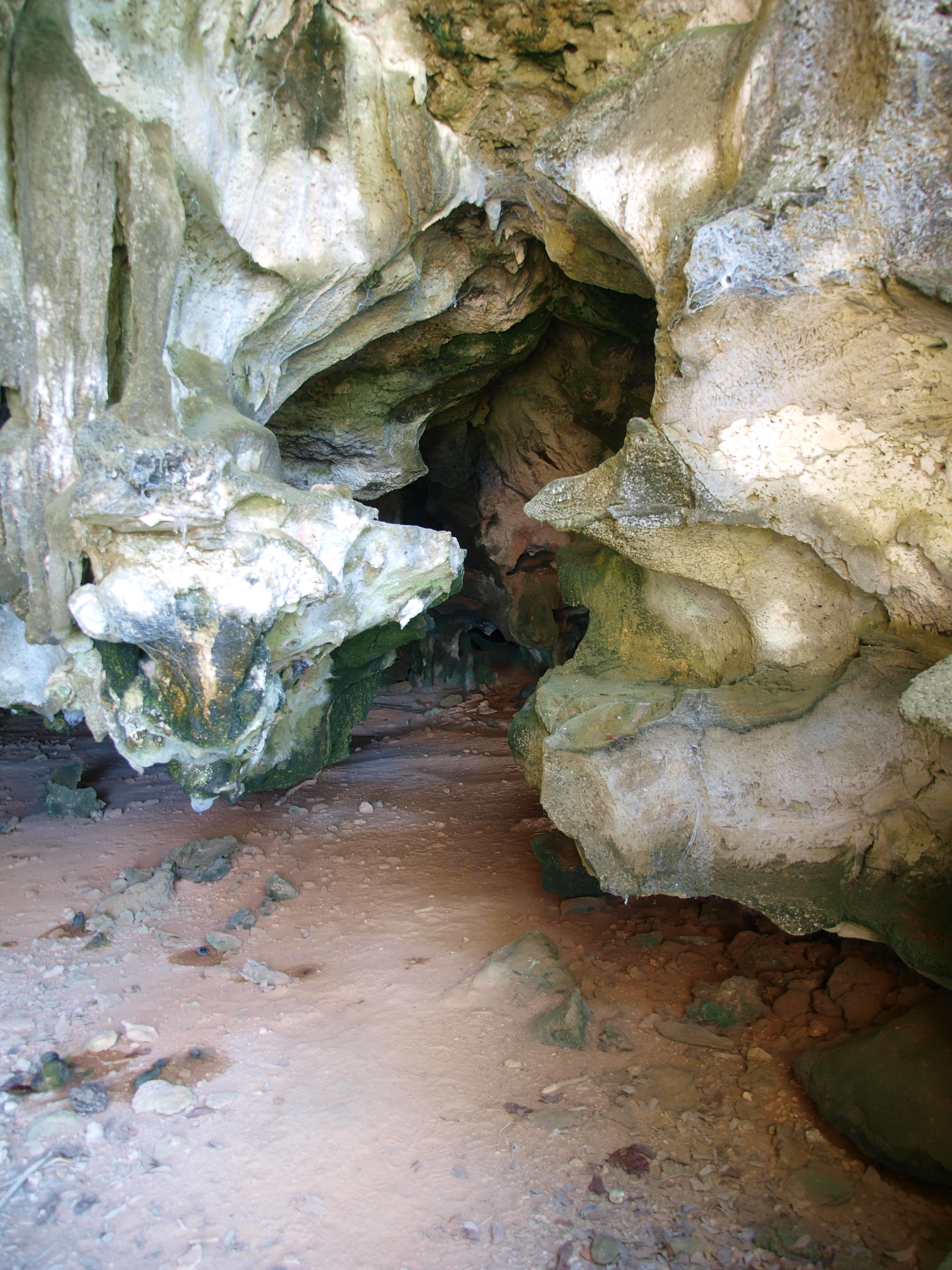
Cueva del Diamante on Isla Mona

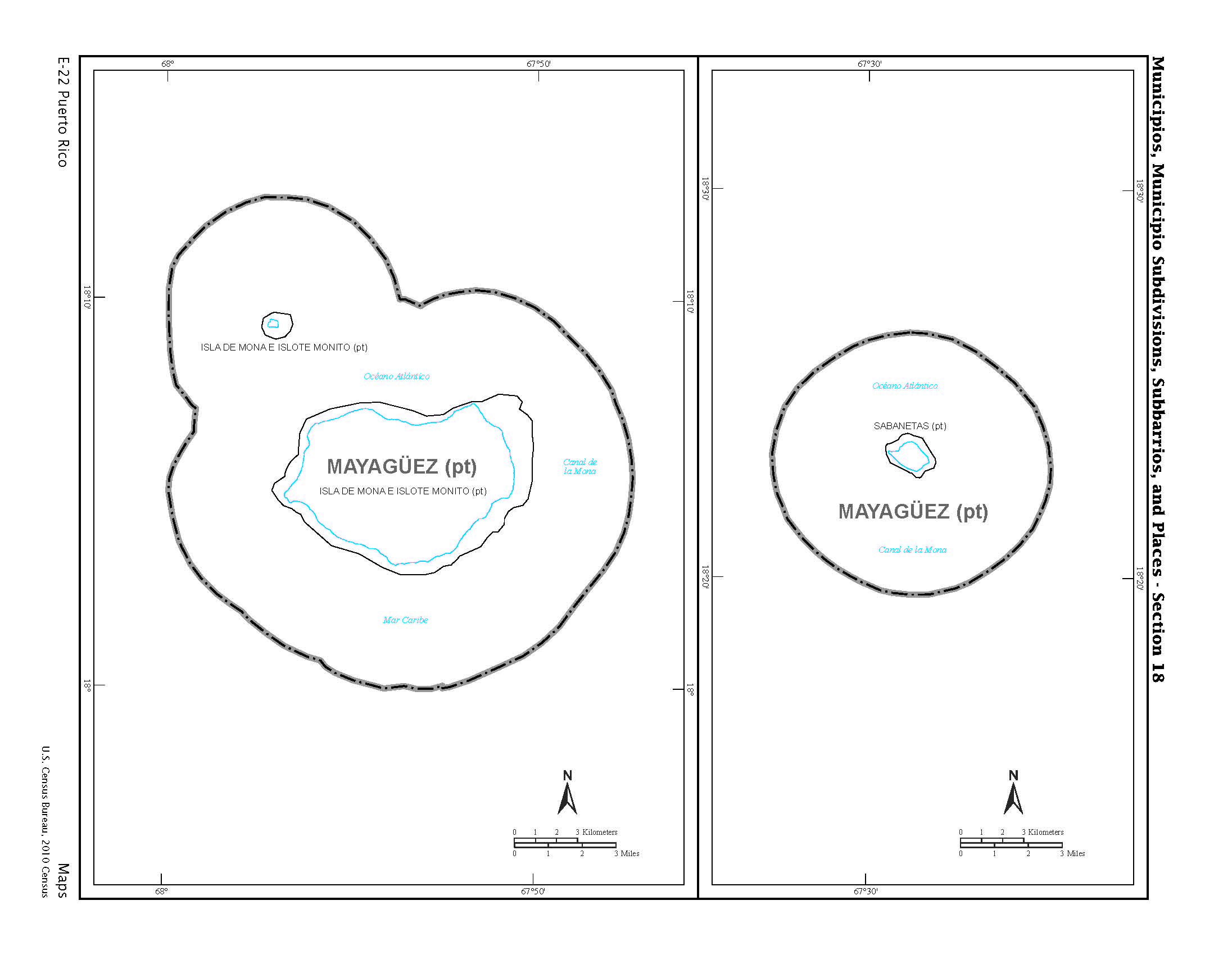
US 2010 Census map of Isla de Mona and Monito Island

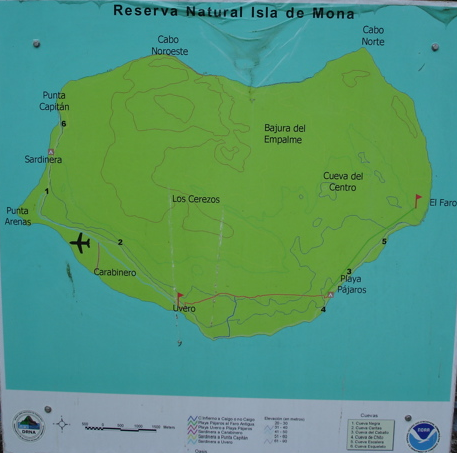
Mona overview map

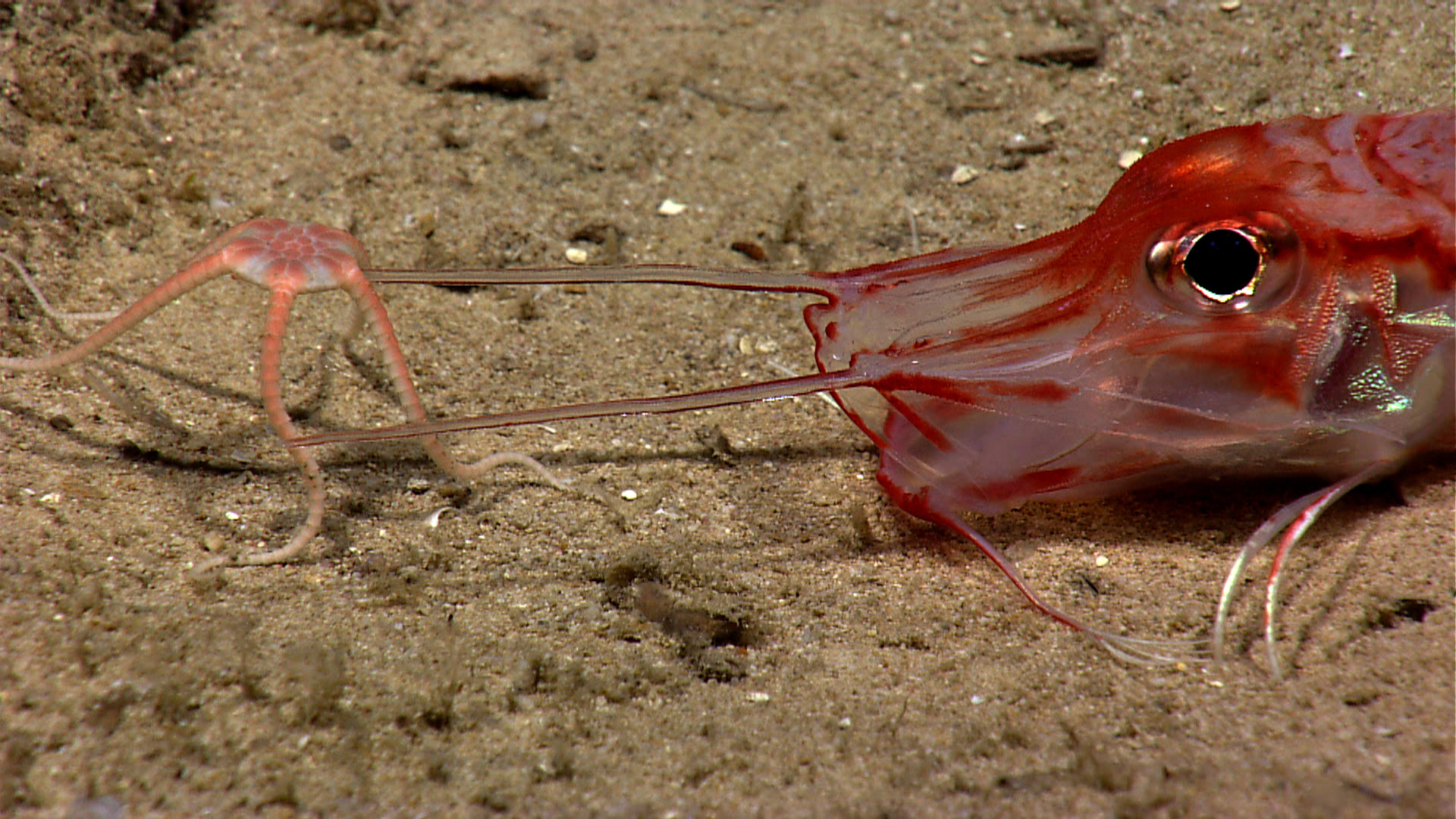
Armored sea robin with brittle star

== See also ==
- Island of Culebra
- Island of Vieques
