= Mona Passage =

Strait connecting the Atlantic and Caribbean

- Canal de la Mona
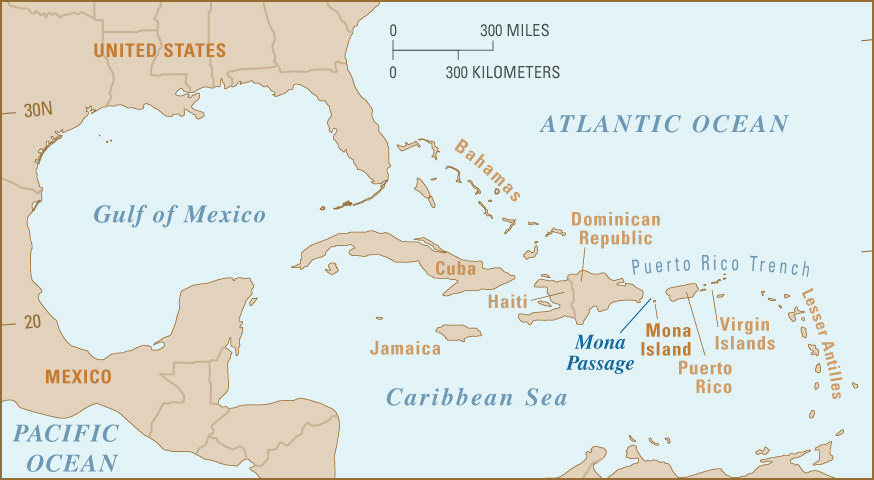
- Location of the Mona Passage between Puerto Rico (east) and the Dominican Republic in Hispaniola (west) within the Caribbean

- Location within the Caribbean Location within Puerto Rico Location within the Dominican Republic
- Coordinates: 18°30′N 67°53′W
- Basin countries: Puerto Rico (U.S.); Dominican Republic

The Mona Passage (Spanish: Canal de la Mona) is a strait that separates the islands of Hispaniola and Puerto Rico in the Greater Antilles of the Caribbean region. Along with the Windward Passage between Hispaniola and Cuba, the approximately 80 miles (130 km) wide Mona Passage connects the North Atlantic Ocean to the Caribbean Sea, operating as an important shipping route between the North Atlantic and the Panama Canal. The passage is fraught with variable tidal currents created by the islands on either side of it, and by sand banks that extend out from both coasts.

Nautical chart of Mona Passage between Hispaniola (west) and Puerto Rico (east), 1955

== Islands ==
There are three small islands in the Mona Passage:

- Mona Island lies close to the middle of the Mona Passage.
- Three miles (5 km) northwest of Mona Island is the much smaller Monito Island.
- Thirty miles (50 km) northeast of Mona Island and much closer (13 mi or 21 km) to the Puerto Rican mainland is Desecheo Island.

== Structure and seismicity ==
The Passage was the site of a devastating earthquake and tsunami that hit western Puerto Rico in 1918. It is the site of frequent small earthquakes. The passage is underlain by a seismically active rift zone that overprints an older, partly eroded tilted-block structure. Desecheo Island sits on the Desecheo ridge, a narrow east-west ridge that extends west from the northwest corner of Puerto Rico. The ridge forms the southern boundary of the 4-kilometer-deep (2.5 mi) Mona Canyon, which extends toward the north into the Puerto Rico Trench. The east face of the rift has a sharp relief of 3 kilometers (1.9 mi) and is controlled by the north-south-trending Mona Rift Fault. The epicenter of the 1918 earthquake was located along the east or southeast edge of the Mona Rift.

== Physical oceanography ==
The Mona Passage connects the Atlantic Ocean waters and Caribbean Sea waters, above a sill depth of 400 to 500 meters (1,300 to 1,600 ft). The sill runs along a northwest to the southeast direction between Cabo Engaño in Hispaniola in the west and the Cabo Rojo Shelf in Puerto Rico to the east margin of the Mona Passage. The vertical profile of the low-frequency (periods longer than 2 days) mean meridional water transport is characterized by a two-layer structure. The upper layer lies above a depth of 300 meters (980 ft), with the upper water masses, the Caribbean Surface Water, Subtropical Underwater and Sargasso Sea Water entering the Caribbean Sea from the Atlantic Ocean. Below this layer, the Tropical Central Water exits toward the Atlantic Ocean. The mean value for the meridional (North-South) transport for a sampled year was –1.85 ± 0.25 sverdrup (Sv) into the Caribbean Sea.

The barotropic tide (surface tide) propagates from northeast to southwest along Mona Passage. The "principal lunar semi-diurnal" constituent, also known as the M2 (or M_{2}), accounts for 52.35% of the total variance observed in the ocean currents, and the semidiurnal current ellipses, with a clockwise rotation, are roughly aligned in a north-south direction.

Semidiurnal tidal currents impinging on a submarine ridge known as El Pichincho can force the generation of an internal tide with a wave height of 40 meters (130 ft). Underwater glider observations reveal wave damping as the internal tide propagates south along the Mona Passage towards the open Caribbean Sea.

Internal tides at El Pichincho can elevate the turbulent vertical diffusivity values (or eddy diffusion), and with a reduction of the Richardson number at the base of the pycnocline. The development of Kelvin-Helmholtz instability during the breaking of the internal tide can explain the formation of high-diffusivity patches that generate a vertical flux of nitrate (NO_{3}^{−}) into the photic zone and can sustain new production locally.

Higher values of primary productivity were observed near the wave trough, than those observed during periods of maximum solar irradiance at noon.

Images from the Moderate-Resolution Imaging Spectroradiometer (MODIS) and International Space Station (ISS) photography show the sea-surface manifestation of packets of internal solitons (or nonlinear internal waves) generated at Banco Engaño, located at the northwest margin of the Mona Passage. The packets propagate either into the Caribbean Sea or the Atlantic Ocean depending on the direction of the currents that forced their generation.

Surface tides, internal tides, internal solitons, inertial currents, and the low-frequency water mass transport between the Atlantic Ocean and the Caribbean Sea make the Mona Passage a very dynamic environment.

== See also ==
- Battle of the Mona Passage
- Bays of the Mona Passage
  - Mayagüez Bay
  - Samaná Bay
  - Scottish Bay
- Mona Canyon
- Old Bahama Channel
