= Spanish Virgin Islands =

Part of the Virgin Islands comprising Culebra and Vieques of Puerto Rico

Spanish Virgin Islands Puerto Rican Virgin Islands
Islas Vírgenes Españolas Islas Vírgenes Puertorriqueñas
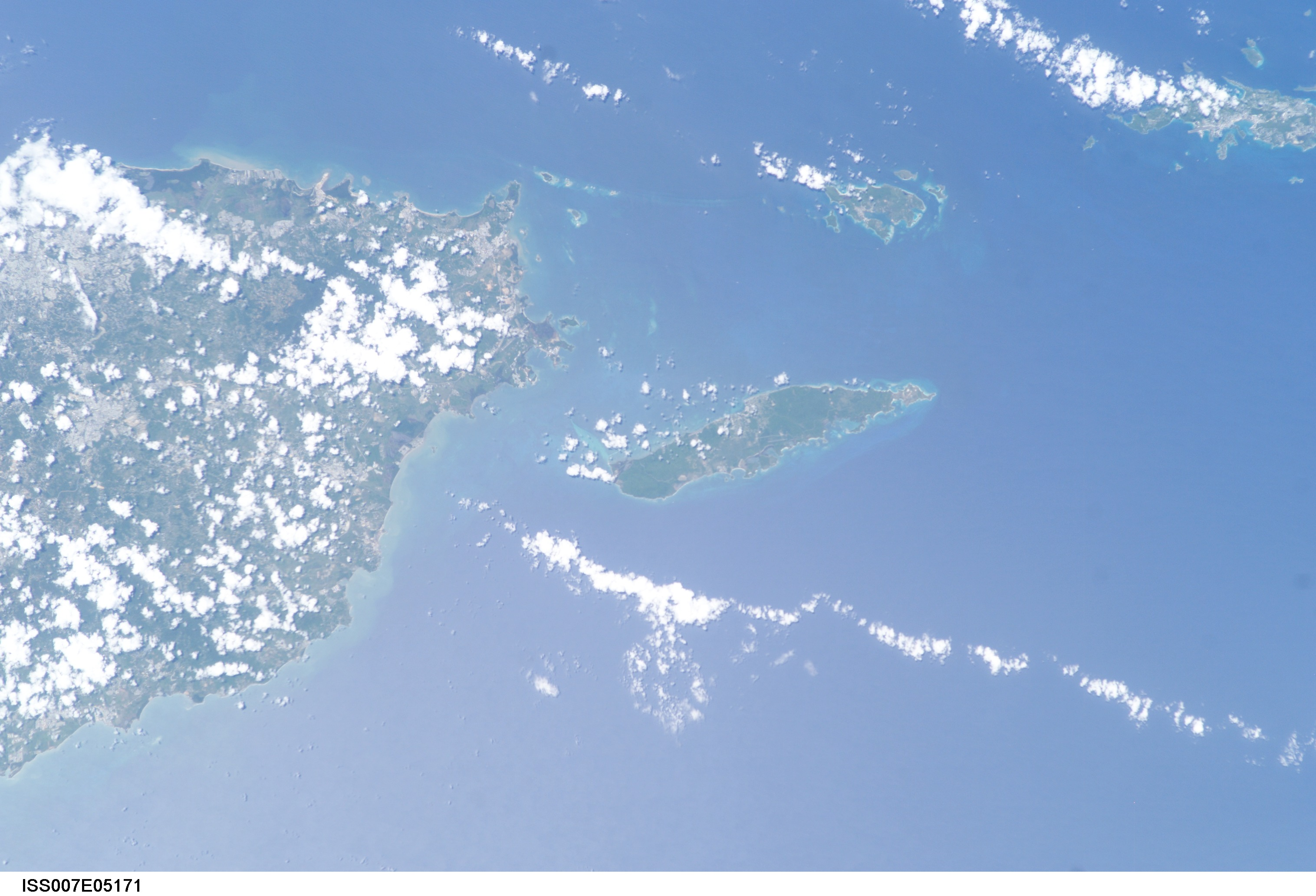
- Satellite image of Vieques (bottom) and Culebra (top) in-between the main island of Puerto Rico (left) and Saint Thomas in the U.S. Virgin Islands (right), May 2003

- Location within Puerto Rico Location within Lesser Antilles Location within the Caribbean

Geography
- Coordinates: 18°13′36.27″N 65°20′18.38″W
- Archipelago: Virgin Islands
- Adjacent to: Caribbean Sea
- Area: 165.1 km^{2} (63.7 sq mi)

Administration
- United States; Puerto Rico
- Municipality: Culebra and Vieques
- Largest settlement: Isabel II barrio-pueblo (pop. 1,459)

Demographics
- Population: 11,119
- Pop. density: 67.35/km^{2} (174.44/sq mi)

The Spanish Virgin Islands (Spanish: Islas Vírgenes Españolas), formerly called the Passage Islands (Spanish: Islas del Pasaje), commonly known as the Puerto Rican Virgin Islands (Spanish: Islas Vírgenes Puertorriqueñas), consist of the islands of Vieques and Culebra, which are administratively part of the archipelago of Puerto Rico as municipalities. Located between the main island of Puerto Rico and the U.S. Virgin Islands in the northeastern Caribbean, the islands are geographically part of the archipelago of the Virgin Islands in the Leeward Islands of the Lesser Antilles.

Geologically separated from the Greater Antilles island of Hispaniola by the Mona Passage and from the Lesser Antilles island arc by the Anegada Passage, the main island of Puerto Rico, the Spanish Virgin Islands of Vieques and Culebra, the British Virgin Islands, and the U.S. Virgin Islands except for the southernmost island of Saint Croix, all lie on the same carbonate platform and insular shelf, the Puerto Rico Bank, between the North Atlantic Ocean and the Caribbean Sea. The archipelagos of Puerto Rico and the Virgin Islands except for Saint Croix also lie on the same tectonic plate, the Puerto Rico–Virgin Islands microplate.

Culebra (far left background) and Vieques (right background) from El Yunque National Forest in Sierra de Luquillo, 2013

== Etymology ==
Historically, the islands of Vieques and Culebra were included in maps and chronicles as part of the archipelago of the Virgin Islands, which was named Santa Úrsula y las Once Mil Vírgenes by Christopher Columbus after the legend of Saint Ursula and the 11,000 virgins. The name was shortened to Islas Vírgenes (Virgins Islands).

Having been discovered during the second voyage of Columbus in 1493, the archipelago of the Virgin Islands was claimed by the Spanish Empire, but the Spaniards never settled them. Over the 17th century, the Spanish, Dutch, French, English, and Danish jostled for control of the islands.

The Dutch established a permanent settlement on the island of Tortola by 1648, frequently clashing with the Spanish who were based on nearby main island of Puerto Rico. In 1672, the English captured Tortola from the Dutch, and the English annexation of Anegada and Virgin Gorda followed in 1680. Meanwhile, over the period between 1672 and 1733, the Danish gained control of the nearby islands of Saint Thomas, Saint John, and Saint Croix.

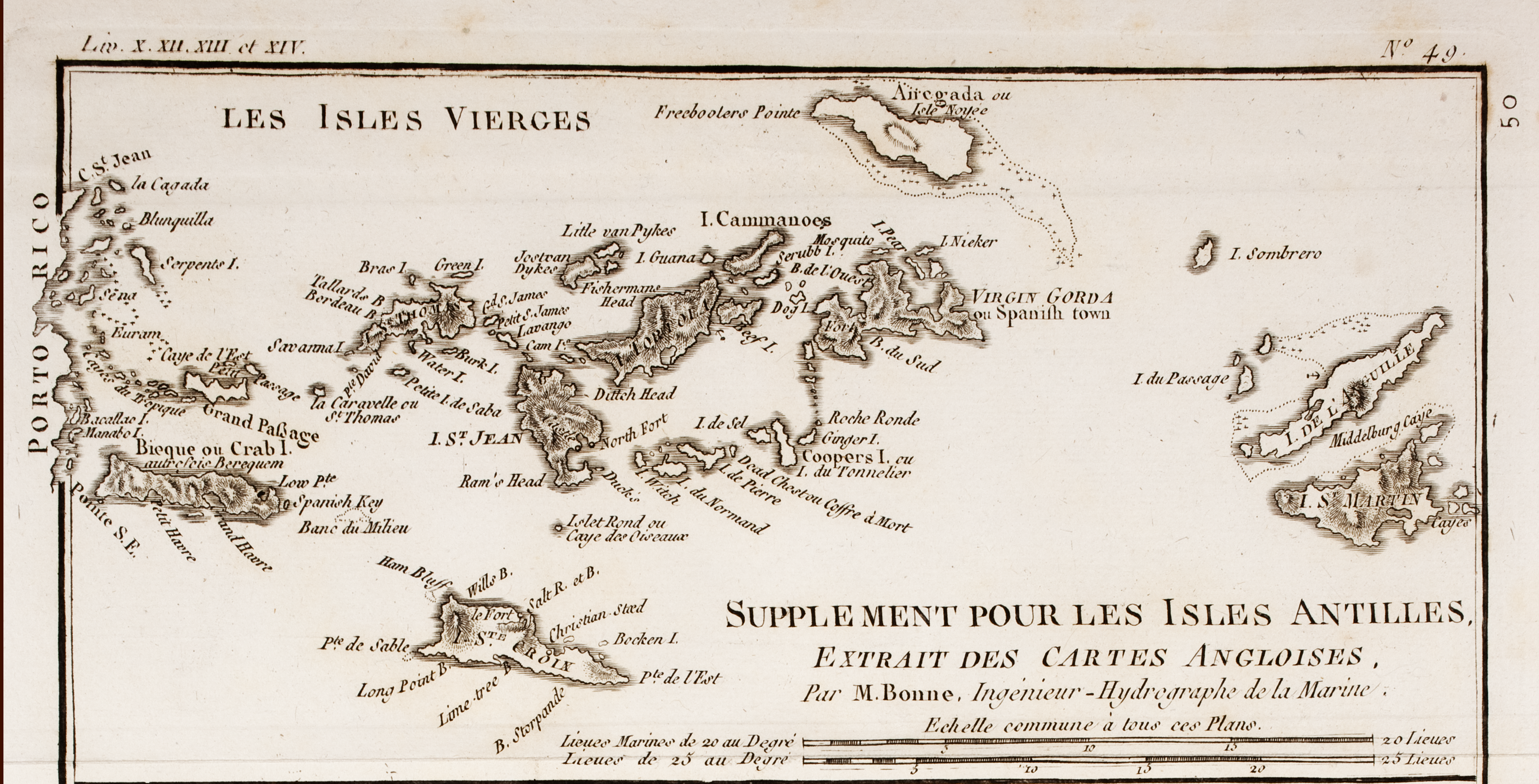
Map of the Virgin Islands by Rigobert Bonne in 1780

The islands under English control were known as the Virgin Islands, while the ones under Danish control were known as the Danish West Indies or Danish Virgin Islands. When the United States purchased the Danish islands in 1917, they became known as the United States Virgin Islands. To distinguish the American part of the Virgin Islands from the neighbouring British islands, those islands under the control of the British Empire began to be known as the British Virgin Islands.

As part of the Virgin Islands archipelago, the islands of Vieques and Culebra, which along with the main island of Puerto Rico, remained under the control of the Spanish Empire throughout the European colonization of the Americas until the Spanish-American War in 1898, are known as the Spanish Virgin Islands, distinguishing them from the other islands in the archipelago: the United States Virgin Islands and the British Virgin Islands.

As island-municipalities of Puerto Rico, Vieques and Culebra are mostly known as islas municipio (island municipality), with Vieques being also popularly known among residents of Puerto Rico as Isla Nena (“girl island”). As such, they are also known as the Islas Vírgenes Puertorriqueñas (Puerto Rican Virgin Islands) or the Islas Vírgenes de Puerto Rico (Virgin Islands of Puerto Rico).

== History ==
Archaeological works in Vieques indicate that the island of Vieques was inhabited by indigenous groups from South America around 1,500 years before the arrival of Christopher Columbus in 1493. The inhabitants of Vieques, brothers of the Taínos of the Big Island of Puerto Rico, resisted the Spaniards' plans of colonization and slavery.

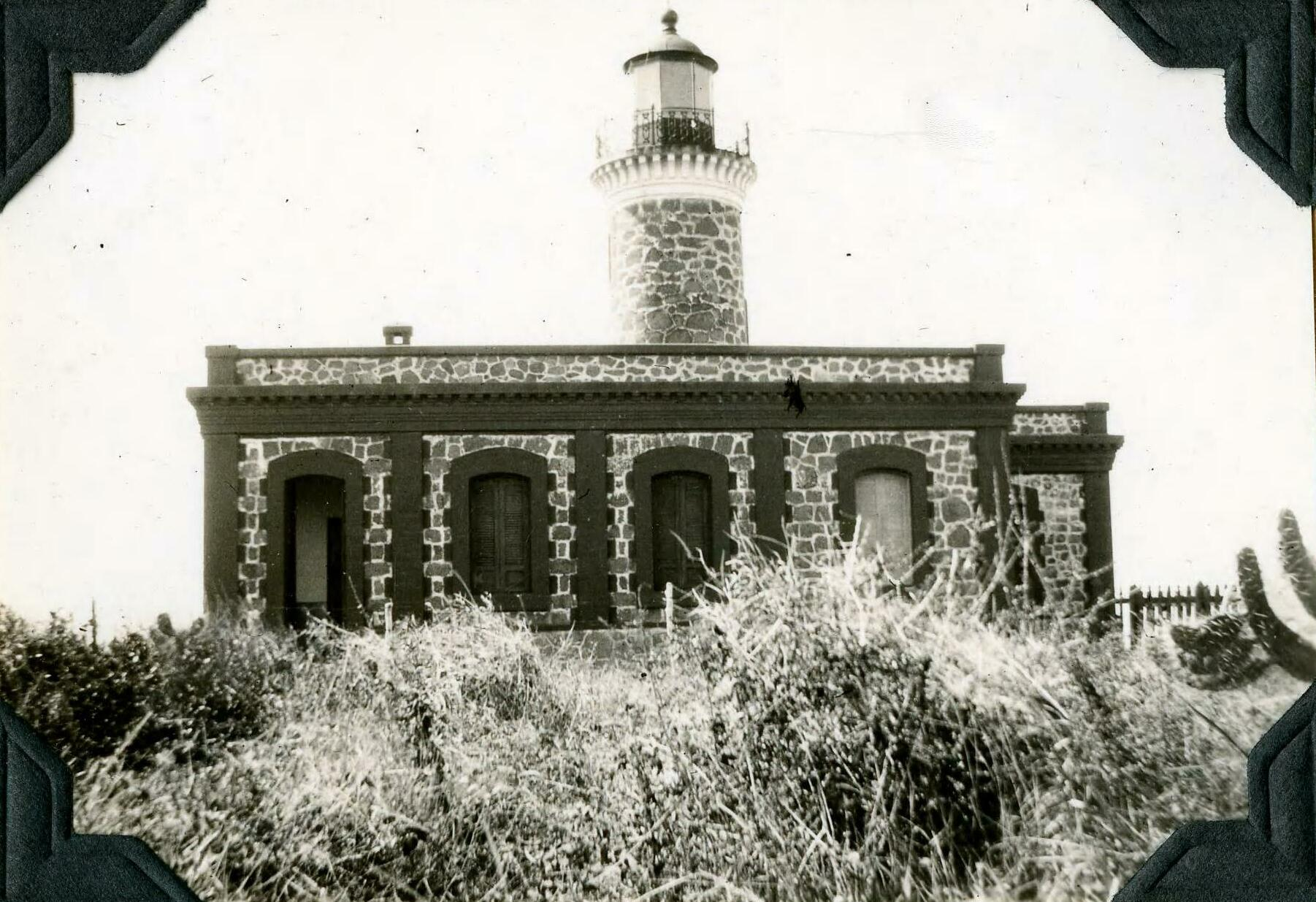
Culebrita Light in the early 1900s

It has been documented that Christopher Columbus discovered the island of Culebra on his second trip to America in 1493. It is believed that the first known inhabitants of the island were the Taíno Indians and then the Caribs. Culebra Island served as a refuge for many defeated Taíno Indians during the rebellion against the Spanish in 1511.

English from Vieques's neighboring British colonies—Tortola, Anguilla, Saint Kitts and Nevis—established themselves in Vieques on several occasions throughout the 17th and 18th centuries. In 1688, and later in 1717, these English tried to colonize Vieques, establishing hamlets, a military fort, an English government, and extensive farming. In both cases the Spanish governor in Puerto Rico sent strong military expeditions and successfully evicted the English invaders and thus assured Spanish domination over Vieques.

In 1875, the Spanish Crown made an effort to populate the island of Culebra. But it was not until 1880 that the colonization of Culebra began with the founding of the town of San Idelfonso de la Culebra.

Like Puerto Rico, the islands belonged to Spain until 1898. On September 19, 1898, the United States took possession of the islands after the signing of the armistice that ended military operations in the Spanish–American War. The islands, along with the islands of Puerto Rico, Mona, Monito, Desecheo, and other smaller islands adjacent to the island of Puerto Rico, were formally ceded by Spain to the United States with the signing of the Treaty of Paris on December 10, 1898.

In 1903 the U.S. government reserved all public lands belonging to the Spanish Crown on the island of Culebra for the use of the U.S. Navy. At that time the U.S. military took complete control of the community of San Ildefonso de la Culebra, expelling its residents, and huddled in a small area of Bahía Sardinas, which they called Dewey in honor of an outstanding American admiral during the Spanish-American War.

On March 17, 1941, Public Law 13 was passed in Washington, allocating $35 million for the construction of the Vieques Base. On August 25 of the same year, Public Law 247 allowed the U.S. Navy to take immediate possession of the lands to be expropriated in Vieques. Thus began the process of military expropriation that left the Navy in control of 26,000 acres (11,000 ha) of the 33,000 acres (13,000 ha) of Vieques territory by the end of the 1940s.

With the outbreak of World War II, Vieques Island became the main artillery- and bombing-practice area for the U.S. Navy and continued to be used for this purpose until 2003.

== Geography ==
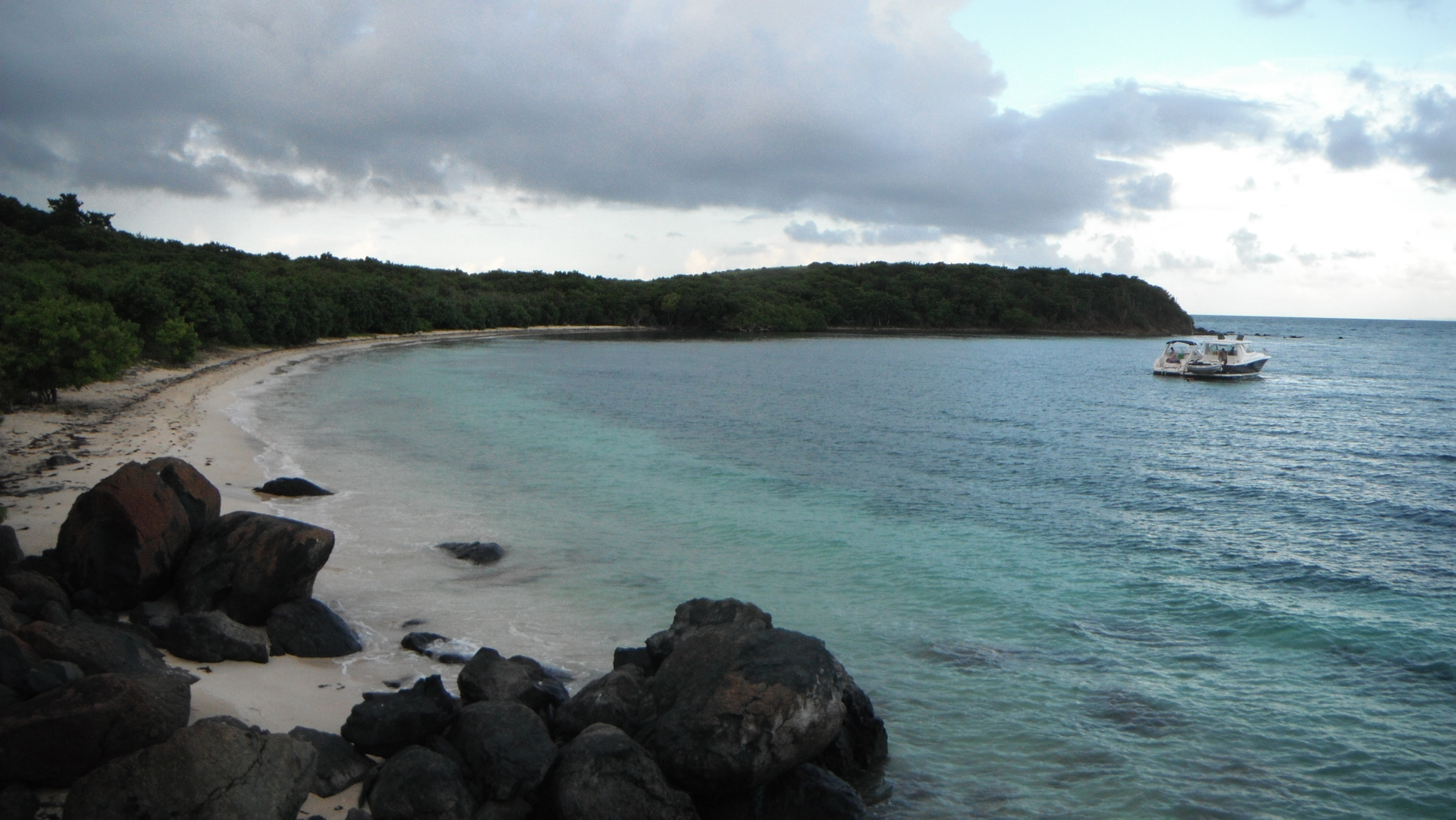
South coast of Pineiro Island

The larger islands are Culebra and Vieques, with multiple associated smaller islands and islets. Other islands that are close to the shore of the main island of Puerto Rico include Icacos Cay, Cayo Lobo, Cayo Diablo, Palomino Island, Palominito Island, Isla de Ramos, and Isla Pineiro. Near Culebra is Cayo Luis Peña.

Much of Vieques is part of the Vieques National Wildlife Refuge, formerly a U.S. Navy training facility.

Culebra's offshore islet, known as Culebrita, is part of the Culebra National Wildlife Refuge. Culebra is characterized by an irregular topography resulting in an intricate coastline. The island is approximately 11 by 8 kilometers (7 by 5 mi). The coast is marked by cliffs, coral sand beaches, and mangroves. The highest elevation on the island is Mount Resaca, which is about 190 meters (623 ft). Its hydrography is based on lagoons (Laguna Flamenco, Laguna Zoní, Laguna de Cornelio, and Laguna de Molino, among others), bays (Ensenada Honda [including Ensenada del Coronel, Ensenada Fulladoza, Ensenada del Cementerio, Ensenada Dákity, Bahía Mosquito, and Ensenada Malena], Puerto Manglar, and Bahía de Tamarindo, among others), and small creeks.

== See also ==
- Dependent territory
- Insular area of the United States
