= Puerto Rico Bank =

Insular shelf and carbonate platform comprising Puerto Rico and the Virgin Islands

carbonate platform and insular shelf
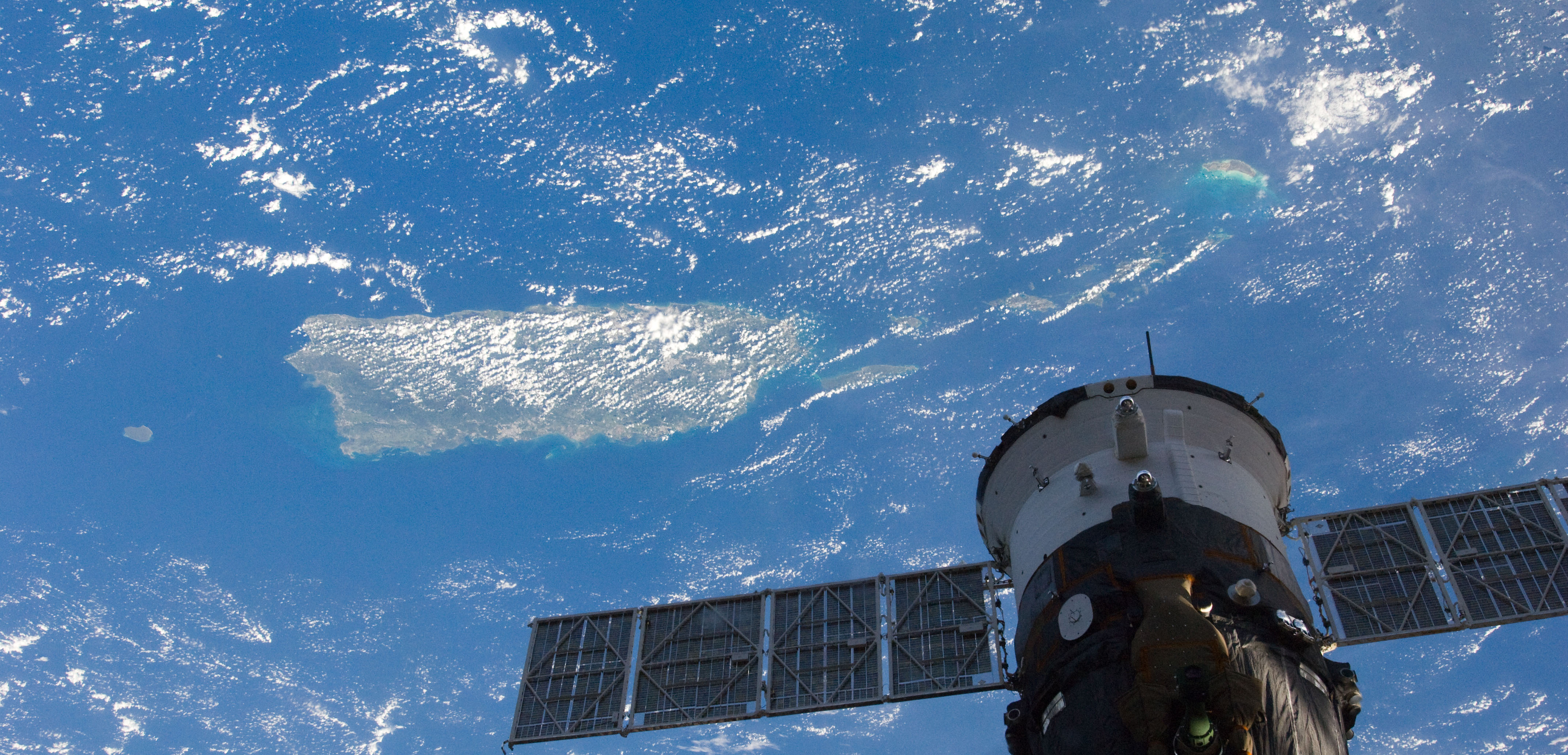
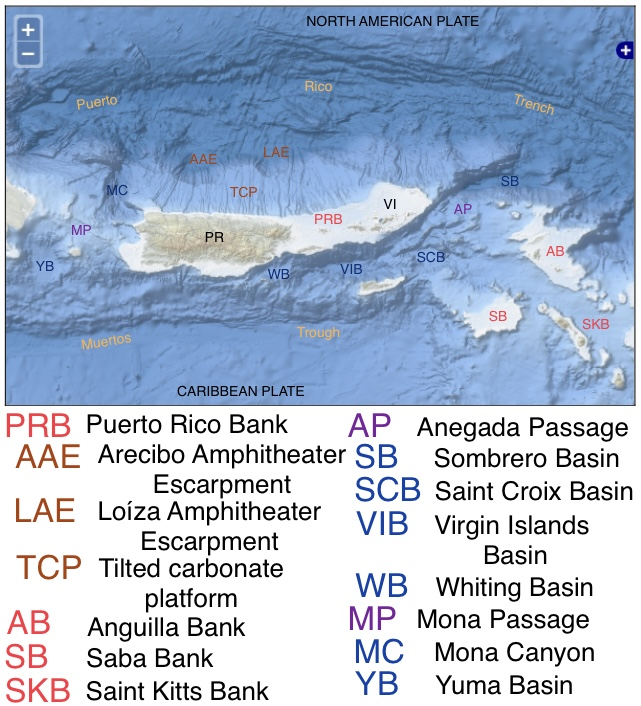
- Puerto Rico and the Virgin Islands, ISS 2017 Puerto Rico Bank and major surrounding geological features

- Location within the Caribbean

Geography
- Location: Caribbean
- Coordinates: 18°17′00″N 65°36′00″W
- Archipelago: Puerto Rico; Virgin Islands
- Area: 21.000 km^{2} (8.108 sq mi)

Administration
- Puerto Rico
- Islands and Cays: 140 (Note: Excluding the westernmost islands of Desecheo, Mona, and Monito, which are politically part of the archipelago of Puerto Rico but are not geologically part of the Puerto Rico Bank, as they lie on their own platforms.)
- United States Virgin Islands
- Islands and Cays: 52 (Note: Excluding the southernmost island of Saint Croix, which is politically part of the Virgin Islands but is not geologically part of the Puerto Rico Bank, as it lies on its own platform.)
- British Virgin Islands
- Islands and Cays: 36

The Puerto Rico Bank (PRB) (Spanish: Banco de Puerto Rico), also known as the Puerto Rican Bank (PRB), is a carbonate platform and insular shelf comprising the archipelagos of Puerto Rico and the Virgin Islands, located between the Greater Antilles and the Lesser Antilles in the northeastern Caribbean. Last subaerially exposed from the Last Glacial Maximum in the Last Glacial Period of the Late Pleistocene Age to the Northgrippian Age of the Holocene Epoch, the bank connected Puerto Rico and the Virgin Islands into a single landmass until sea level rise fragmented it into the present-day islands between 10,000 and 7,000 years Before Present (8,050 and 5,050 years Before Common Era). It is within the Puerto Rico–Virgin Islands microplate between the North American plate and Caribbean plate.

== Name ==
Most commonly known as the Puerto Rico Bank and Puerto Rican Bank, the bank is named after the largest island within its limits, the eponymous main island of the archipelago of Puerto Rico. The part of the bank covering the Virgin Islands is occasionally referred to as the Virgin Bank.

== Location ==
The demarcated banks of Puerto Rico, Anguilla, Saba, Saint Kitts, Barbuda, Monserrat, and Guadeloupe on nautical chart, 1857

Separated from the Greater Antilles by the Mona Passage and from the Lesser Antilles by the Anegada passage in the northeastern Caribbean Sea of the Atlantic Ocean, the Puerto Rico Bank compromises the main island of Puerto Rico, the Spanish Virgins Islands of Vieques and Culebra, the U.S. Virgin Islands of Saint Thomas and Saint John, and the British Virgin Islands of Jost Van Dyke, Tortola, Virgin Gorda, and Anegada. It includes all surrounding minor islands and cays of each one of the aforementioned major islands. The westernmost islands of Desecho, Mona, and Monito of Puerto Rico, and the southernmost island of Saint Croix of the U.S. Virgin Islands do not form part of the bank, as they lie on their own platforms.

== Extent ==
Including the island within the Puerto Rico Bank, it measures 350 km (218 mi) in length and 40 to 80 km (25 to 50 mi) in width. Around the main island of Puerto Rico, the bank is 2 to 15 km (1.2 to 9.3 mi) wide from the southeast to the southwest, over 15 to 2 km (9.3 to 1.2 mi) wide from the southwest to northwest, and less than 2 km (1.2 mi) wide from the northwest to the northeast. Around the archipelago of the Virgin Islands, the bank is 40 to 65 km (25 to 40 mi) wide.

The Puerto Rico Bank is less than 79 m (260 ft) in depth, with the portion connecting all the islands being less than 40 metres (130 feet) in depth. All islands and cays in the archipelago of Puerto Rico, including Vieques and Culebra, are connected less than 25 metres (82 feet). Similarly, the main islands of the U.S. Virgin Islands and the British Virgin Islands are connected by less than 25 metres (82 feet). The Spanish Virgin Islands of Vieques and Culebra and the American and British islands are separated by a narrow strait, the Virgin Passage, which is 16 km (10 m) in length and 20 to 32 m (66 to 105 ft) in depth.

With an area of 21,000 km^{2} (8,100 sq mi), it was last fully exposed during the Last Glacial Maximum when the sea level was 120 metres (390 feet) lower than the present-day. The bank was inundated by sea level rise during the Late Pleistocene and Early Holocene, losing subaerial connection the main island of Puerto Rico and the Spanish Virgin Islands with the U.S. Virgin Islands and British Virgin Islands 10,000 to 8,000 years Before Present ago (8,050 to 6,050 years Before Christ ago). The main island of Puerto Rico with Vieques, and the U.S. Virgin Islands and the British Virgin Islands with each other lost their land connection 7,000 years BP ago (5,050 years BC ago), while the main island of Puerto Rico with some of its minor islands, cays, and islets 3,000 BP years ago (1,050 BC years ago).
