= Noroît =

Noroît is French word meaning North-West wind. It may refer to:

- Noroît (film), a 1976 French film
- Noroît Seamount, a seamount in the Caribbean Sea
- RV Le Noroît, a defunct research vessel, sister ship of RV Le Suroît
