= Milwaukee Deep =

Deepest part of the Atlantic Ocean; part of the Puerto Rico Trench

Milwaukee Deep, also known as the Milwaukee Depth, is the deepest part of the Puerto Rico Trench, constituting the deepest points in the Atlantic Ocean. Together with the surrounding seabed area, known as Brownson Deep, the Milwaukee Deep forms an elongated depression that constitutes the floor of the trench. As there is no geomorphological distinction between the two, it has been proposed that the use of both names to refer to distinct areas should be reviewed.

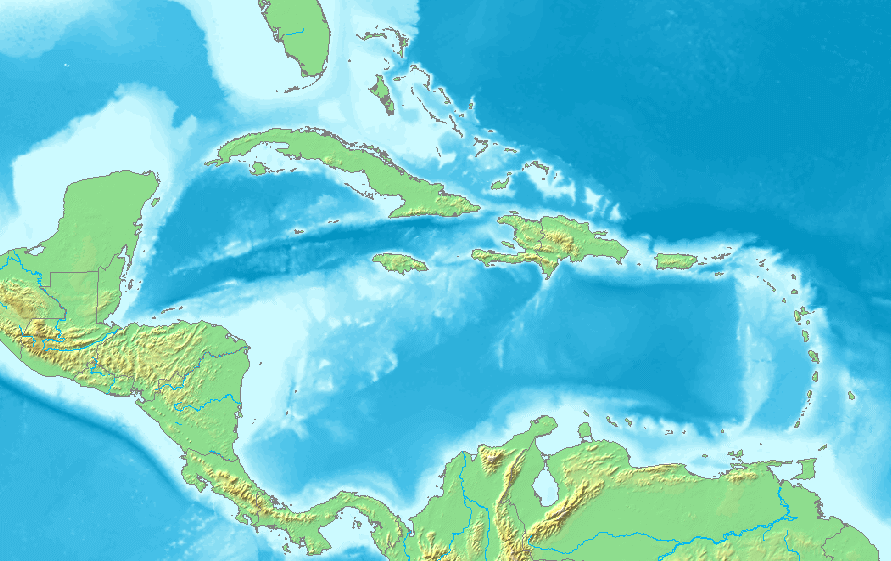
Location of Milwaukee Deep north of Puerto Rico

During the Five Deeps Expedition, explorer Victor Vescovo achieved the first crewed descent to the location on 21 December 2018. Media outlets overwhelmingly referred to the area as the Brownson Deep, while the name Milwaukee Deep was used by others. However, likely due to the factors mentioned above, the expedition has not used any particular name to refer to the site of their Atlantic dive. It is named for the USS Milwaukee, which recorded the first echo soundings of the Puerto Rico Trench in 1939, and was itself named for the city of Milwaukee.

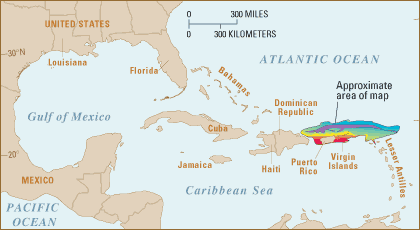
Location of the Puerto Rico Trench, USGS

Located roughly 76.0 miles (122.3 km; 66.0 nmi) north of the coast of the main island of Puerto Rico at Punto Palmas Altas in Manatí, the maximum depth of the Milwaukee Deep is 8,376 metres (27,480 ft; 4,580 fathoms), as directly measured by Vescovo during his 2018 descent to the deepest point of the Atlantic Ocean. The maximum depth of the Milwaukee Deep has also been reported at 8,750 m (28,710 ft; 4,780 fathoms) in 1940 by geologist and oceanographer Thomas Wayland Vaughan, 8,705 m (28,560 ft; 4,760 fathoms) in 1954 by John Lyman, professor of oceanography at University of North Carolina at Chapel Hill, and 8,740 m (28,670 ft; 4,780 fathoms) in 2014 by the General Bathymetric Chart of the Oceans (GEBCO), and 8,526 m (27,972 ft; 4,662 fathoms) in 2018 by marine geologist Heather Stewart and marine biologist Alan Jamieson. Stewart and Jamieson also reported a maximum depth of 8,408 m (27,585 ft; 4,598 fathoms) in 2019 and 8,378 m (27,487 ft; 4,581 fathoms) in 2021.

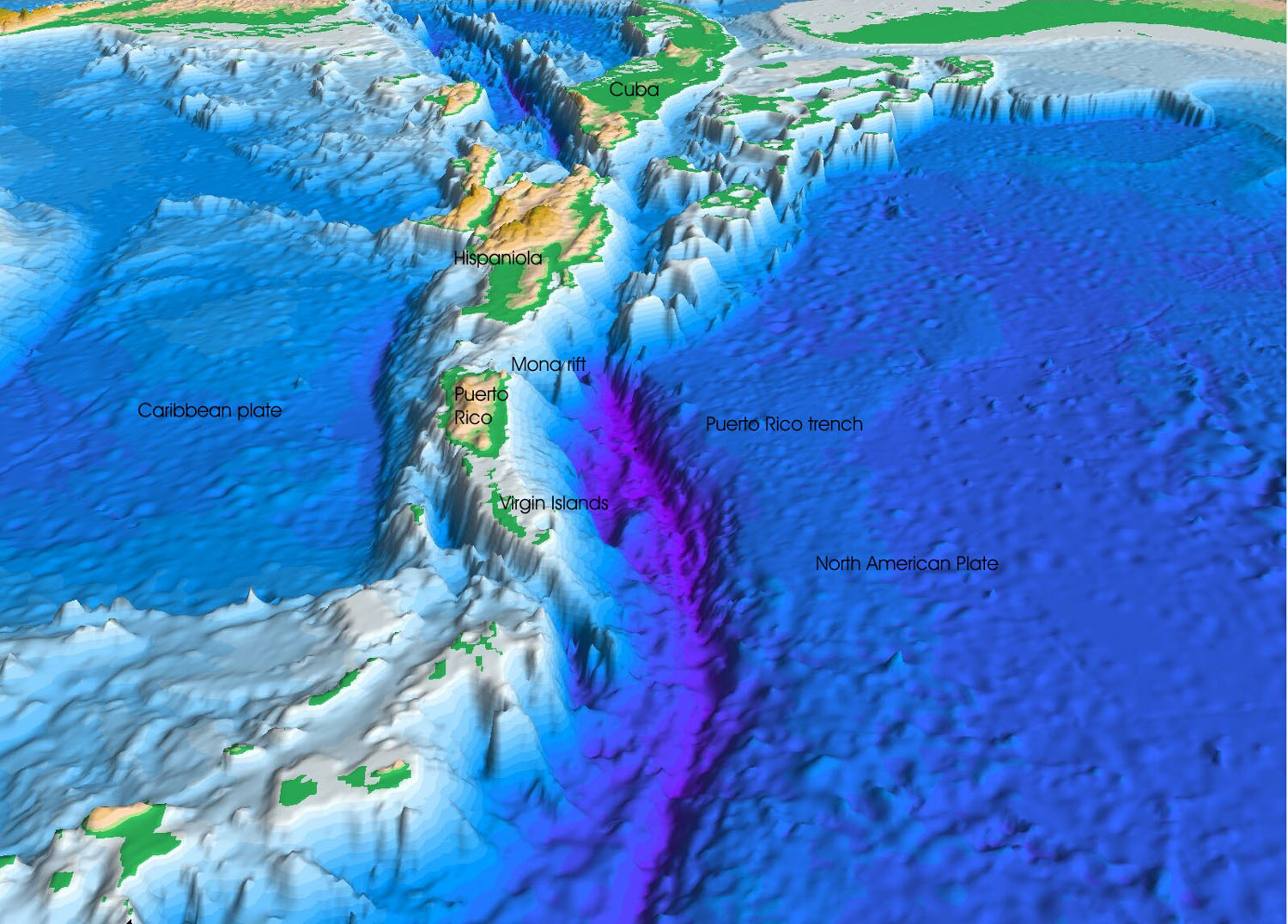
Perspective view of the sea floor of the Atlantic Ocean and the Caribbean Sea. The Lesser Antilles are on the lower left side of the view and Florida is on the upper right. The purple sea floor at the center of the view is the Puerto Rico Trench, the deepest part of the Atlantic Ocean.

== History ==
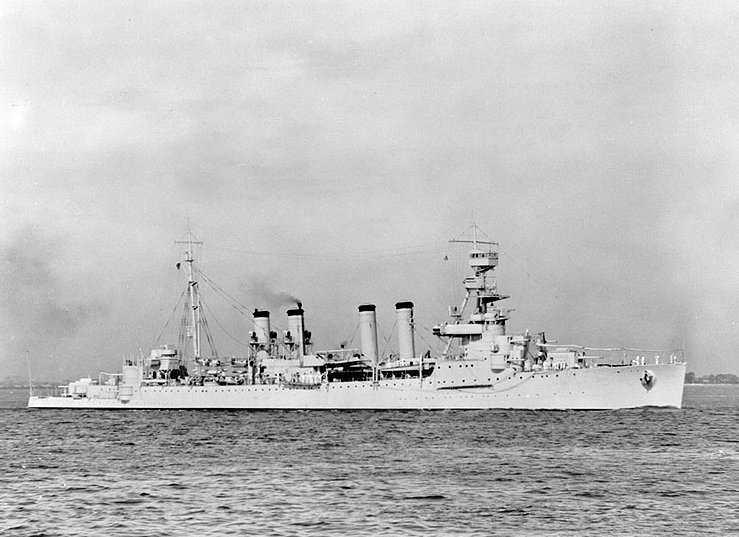
Discoverer ship USS Milwaukee (CL-5)

The ocean floor feature is named for the USS Milwaukee (CL-5), a U.S. Navy Omaha class cruiser, which discovered the Milwaukee Deep on February 14, 1939 with a reading of 28,680 feet (8,740 m; 4,780 fathoms). On August 19, 1952, the U.S. Fish and Wildlife vessel Theodore N. Gill obtained a reading of 28,560 feet (8,710 m; 4,760 fathoms) at (19°36′N 68°19′W), virtually identical with the Milwaukee's reading. By then, the existence of deep water to the Atlantic Ocean side of the Caribbean had been known for more than a century.

One of the area's earliest soundings was obtained June 12, 1852 by Lt. S. P. Lee, U.S. Navy brig Dolphin, with a reading of 22,950 feet (7,000 m; 3,825 fathoms) at (26°32′N 60°06′W).

=== Crewed descents ===
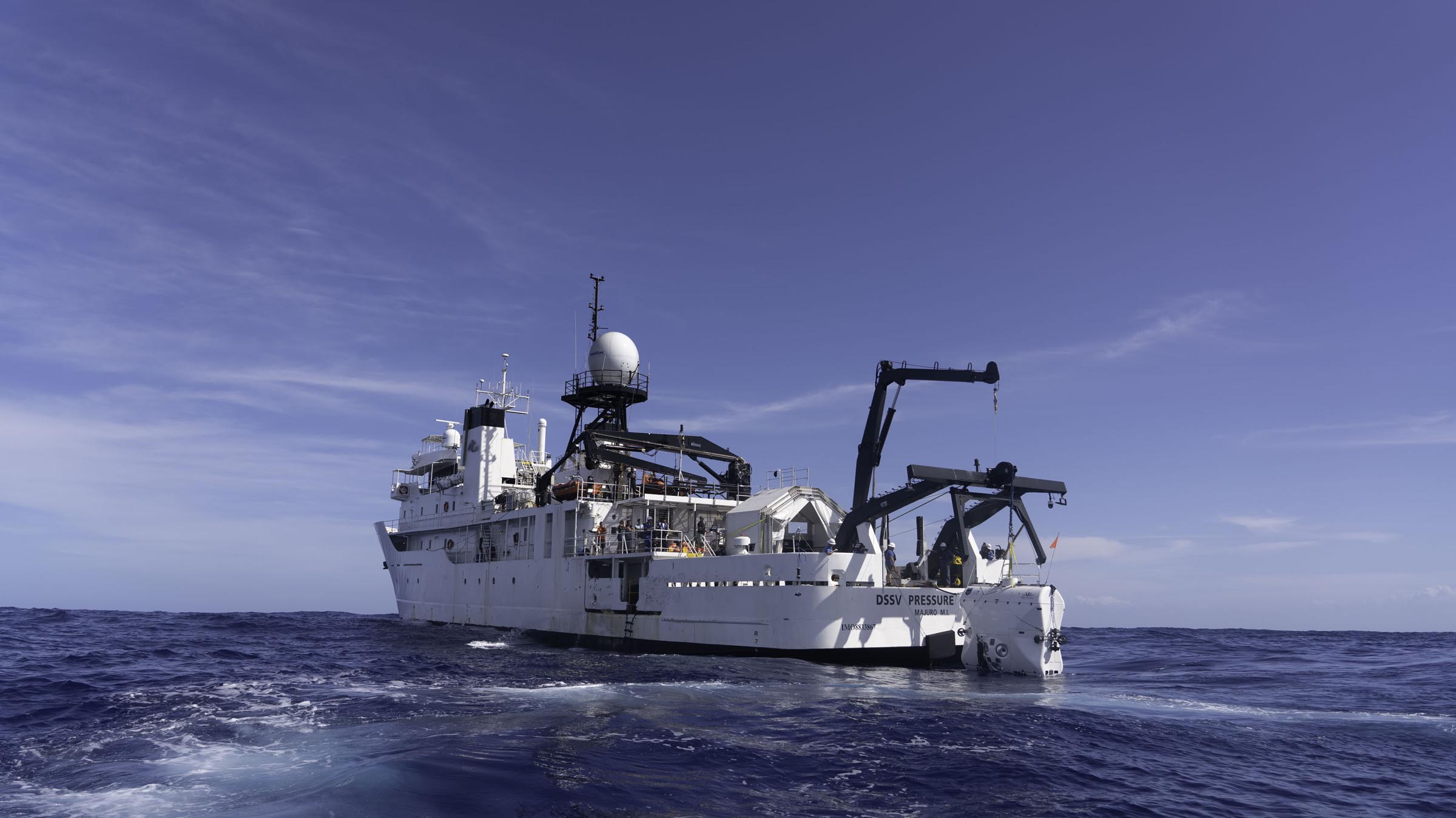
Deep Submersible Support Vessel DSSV Pressure Drop and DSV Limiting Factor at its stern

In 1964, the French submersible Archimède explored the Puerto Rico Trench to a depth of approximately 8,300 m (27,200 ft; 4,500 fathoms) but did not reach its deepest point.

On 21 December 2018 Victor Vescovo made the first crewed descent to the deepest point of the trench in the Deep-Submergence Vehicle DSV Limiting Factor (a Triton 36000/2 model submersible) and measured a depth of 8,376 m (27,480 ft; 4,580 fathoms) by direct CTD pressure measurements. This made the Limiting Factor the deepest-diving operational submersible at the time.

== See also ==
- List of submarine topographical features
- Oceanic trench
- Challenger Deep
