= Thomazeau Volcano =

Extinct volcano in Thomazeau, Haiti

- Location within Haiti

Highest point
- Coordinates: 18°41′N 72°05′W

Geography
- Location: Thomazeau, Ouest, Haiti

Geology
- Rock age: 1.5 MYA
- Mountain type: Cinder cones
- Last eruption: Pleistocene

Thomazeau Volcano or the Thomazeau cinder cones, is a group of extinct cinder cones outside of Thomazeau, Haiti, it was active from 1.5 million years ago to the Pleistocene.

It was discovered in 1982 by the Haitian Bureau of Mines and Energy, who discovered materials such as Nepheline, pyroclastic flows and basalt rock. Only a very well-preserved cone remains where its lava flow is distinctly visible.

== See also ==
- Morne la Vigie
- List of volcanoes in Haiti
