= Puerto Rico–Virgin Islands microplate =

Part of the boundary between the North American Plate and the Caribbean Plate

The Puerto Rico–Virgin Islands microplate (PRVI), also known as the Puerto Rico–Virgin Islands block, is a tectonic microplate formed at the boundary zone between the Caribbean plate and the obliquely subducting North American plate.

== Details ==
Consisting of the archipelagos of Puerto Rico and the Virgin Islands, it is bounded to the north by the Puerto Rico Trench, to the south by the Muertos Trough, to the east by the Virgin Island Basin, Anegada Gap, and Sombrero Basin in the Anegada Passage, and to west by the Yuma Basin and Mona Canyon in the Mona Passage.

The existence of this microplate was first proposed in 1991. GPS has monitored the microplate with permanent stations for more than two decades.

Puerto Rico and the Virgin Islands lie on the same carbonate platform, the Puerto Rico Bank, within the microplate.

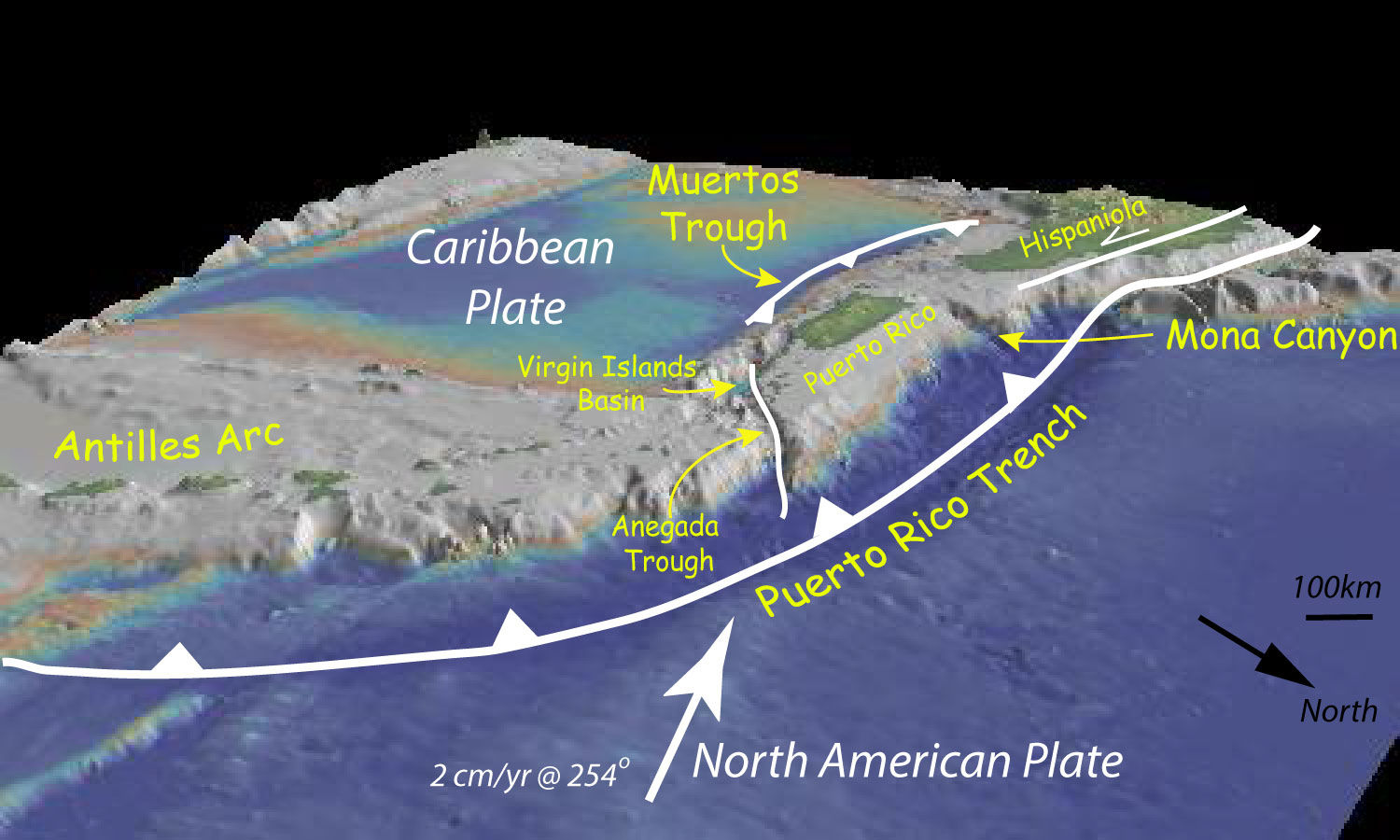
Bathymetry of the North American plate and Caribbean plate boundary zone showing the major features of the Puerto Rico-Virgin Island Microplate: the Puerto Rico Trench to the north; the Muertos Trough the south; the Anegada Trough and Virgin Islands Basin within the Anegada Passage to the east; and the Mona Canyon within the Mona Passage to the west
