= Geography of Puerto Rico =

Coordinates: 18°15′N 66°30′W

Puerto Rico
Native name: Borinquén (Taino) Nickname: Isla del Encanto (Spanish) (Island of Enchantment)
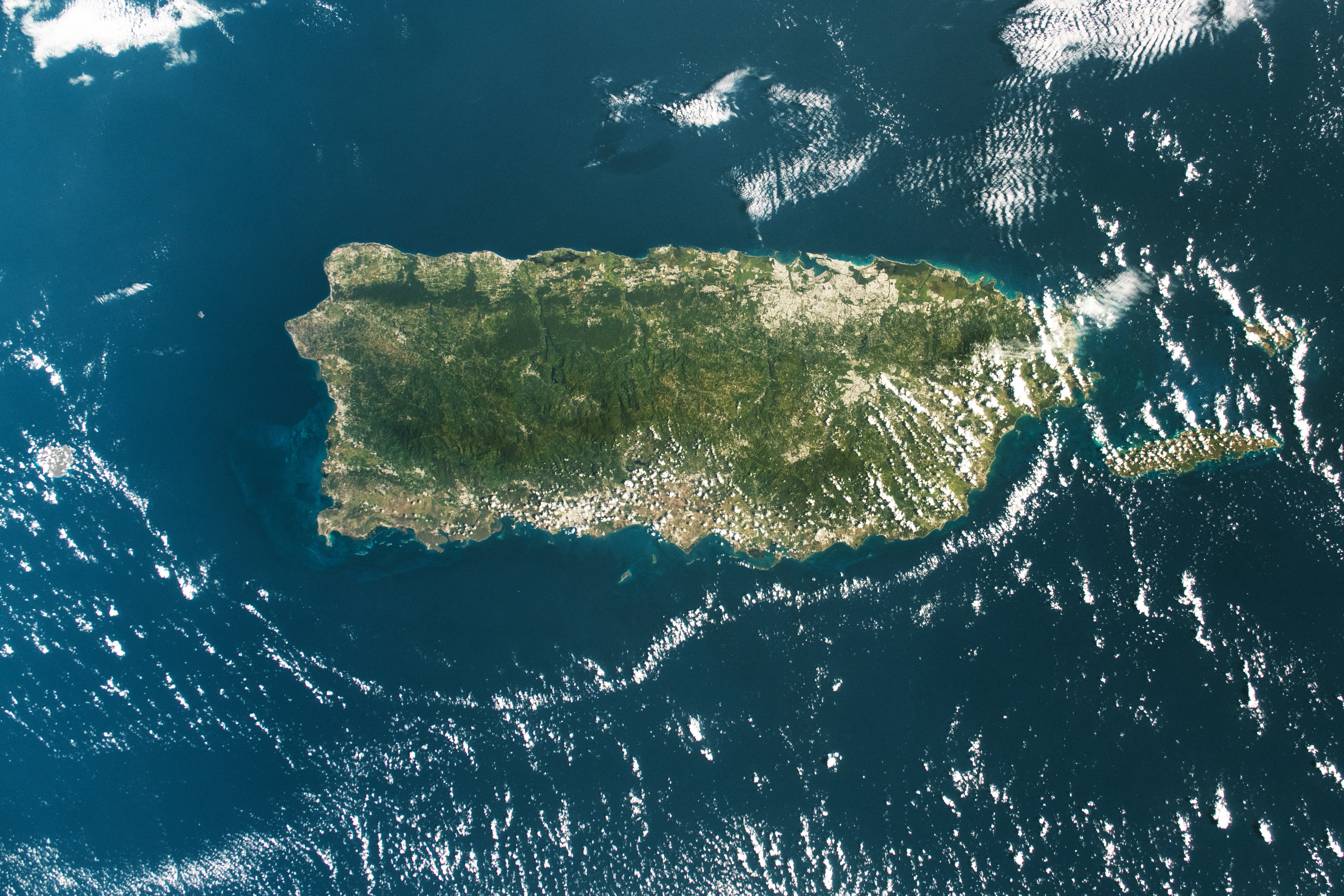
- NASA image of Puerto Rico, 2024

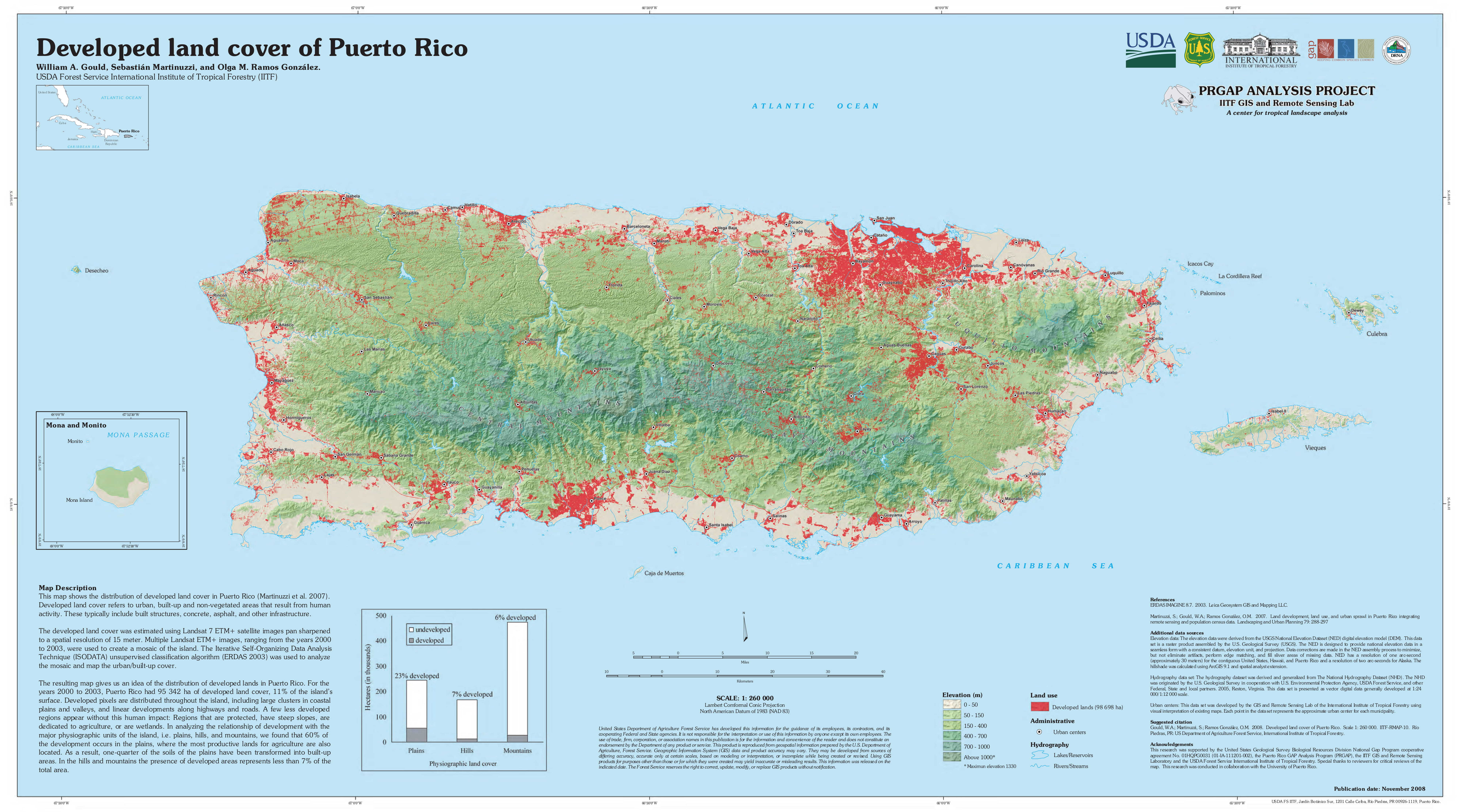
- Topographic map of Puerto Rico showing urbanized areas (red), 2008

Geography
- Location: Caribbean
- Area: 8,868 km^{2} (3,424 sq mi) (Note: The area of the island of Puerto Rico, the main island of the archipelago of the same name, is 5,325 m² (13,792 km²). The land and internal coastal water area of the island is 3,513 m² (9,100 km²), with land covering 3,424 m² (8,868 km²) and internal coastal waters 89 m² (232 km²). The territorial sea of the island stretches for 1,812 m² (4,692 km²). Including the islands of Vieques with a land area of 51 m² (132 km²), Mona with 22 m² (56 km²), Culebra with 12 m² (31 km²), Caja de Muertos with 0.62 m² (1.62 km²), and Desecheo with 0.56 m² (1.45 km²), the entire archipelago of Puerto Rico has a land area of at least 3,510 m² (9,090 km²). The exclusive economic zone of the archipelago covers 68,605 m² (177,327 km²).)
- Length: 177 km (110 mi) (Note: Puerto Rico, the main island of the archipelago of the same name, is 177 kilometers long (110 statute miles; 96 nautical miles) and 65 kilometers wide (40 statute miles; 35 nautical miles). Boricuas often refer to Puerto Rico as 100x35 (Spanish: 100por35), a direct reference to the island's size in nautical miles. Various Puerto Rican singers have used the term, including Farruko and Pedro Capó in their song Jíbaro (2021).)
- Width: 65 km (40.4 mi)
- Coastline: 501 km (311.3 mi)
- Highest point: Cerro de Punta; 1,338 m (4,390 ft)

Administration
- United States
- Unincorporated territory: Puerto Rico
- Capital and largest city: San Juan (pop. 333,005)

Demographics
- Population: 3,184,195 (2025)
- Pop. density: 359.0/km^{2} (929.8/sq mi)

The geography of Puerto Rico encompasses an archipelagic and island nation centered around a collective identity based on its land, history, ethnicity, culture, and language, and organized as a self-governing unincorporated territory of the United States. Located between the Greater and Lesser Antilles in the northeastern Caribbean, east of Hispaniola, west of Saint Thomas, north of Venezuela, and south of the Puerto Rico Trench, (Note: The main island of Puerto Rico is 113 km (61 nmi) east of Hispaniola from Punta Higüero in Puntas, Rincón to Cabo Engaño in Punta Cana, Dominican Republic, 60 km (32 nmi) west of the U.S. Virgin Islands from Punta Puerca in Machos, Ceiba to Mermaid’s Chair in Saint Thomas, 705 km (380 nmi) north of Venezuela from Cabo Rojo in Llanos Costa, Cabo Rojo to Cabo San Román in Paraguaná, Falcón, Venezuela, and 120 km (65 nmi) south of the Puerto Rico Trench from Bajura, Isabela to the middle of the trench. As a whole, the archipelago of Puerto Rico is 58 km (31 nmi) east of Hispaniola from Monito to Cabo San Rafael in San Rafael del Yuma, Dominican Republic, 15 km (8 nmi) west of the U.S. Virgin Islands from Culebrita in Culebra to Savana Island in Saint Thomas, 705 km (380 nmi) north of Venezuela from Cabo Rojo in Llanos Costa, Cabo Rojo to Cabo San Román in Paraguaná, Falcón, Venezuela, and 120 km (65 nmi) south of the Puerto Rico Trench from Bajura in Isabela to the middle of the trench.) Puerto Rico consists of the eponymous main island and over 140 smaller islands, islets, and cays, including San Juan in the north, Vieques, Culebra, Palominos, and Icacos in the east, Caja de Muertos and Caracoles in the south, and Mona, Monito, and Desecheo in the west.

Measuring 177 km (110 mi; 96 nmi) in length and 65 km (40 mi; 35 nmi) in width with a land area of 8,868 km^{2} (3,424 sq mi), the main island of Puerto Rico is the 4th largest in the Caribbean, 29th in the Americas, and 81st in the world, making it the 170th largest country or dependency by surface area. With 3.2 million residents, it is also the 4th largest in the Caribbean, 4th in the Americas, and 31st in the world, making it the 136th largest country or dependency by population.

Puerto Rico (right-center) within the Caribbean as seen from space at night, 2012

== Overview ==
Geologically separated from the Greater Antilles island of Hispaniola by the Mona Passage and from the Lesser Antilles island arc by the Anegada Passage, the main island of Puerto Rico, the Spanish Virgin Islands of Vieques and Culebra, the British Virgin Islands, and the U.S. Virgin Islands except for the southernmost island of Saint Croix all lie on the same carbonate platform and insular shelf, the Puerto Rico Bank, between the Puerto Rico Trench in the North Atlantic Ocean and the Muertos Trough in the northeastern Caribbean Sea. The archipelagos of Puerto Rico and the Virgin Islands except for Saint Croix also lie on the same tectonic plate, the Puerto Rico–Virgin Islands microplate.

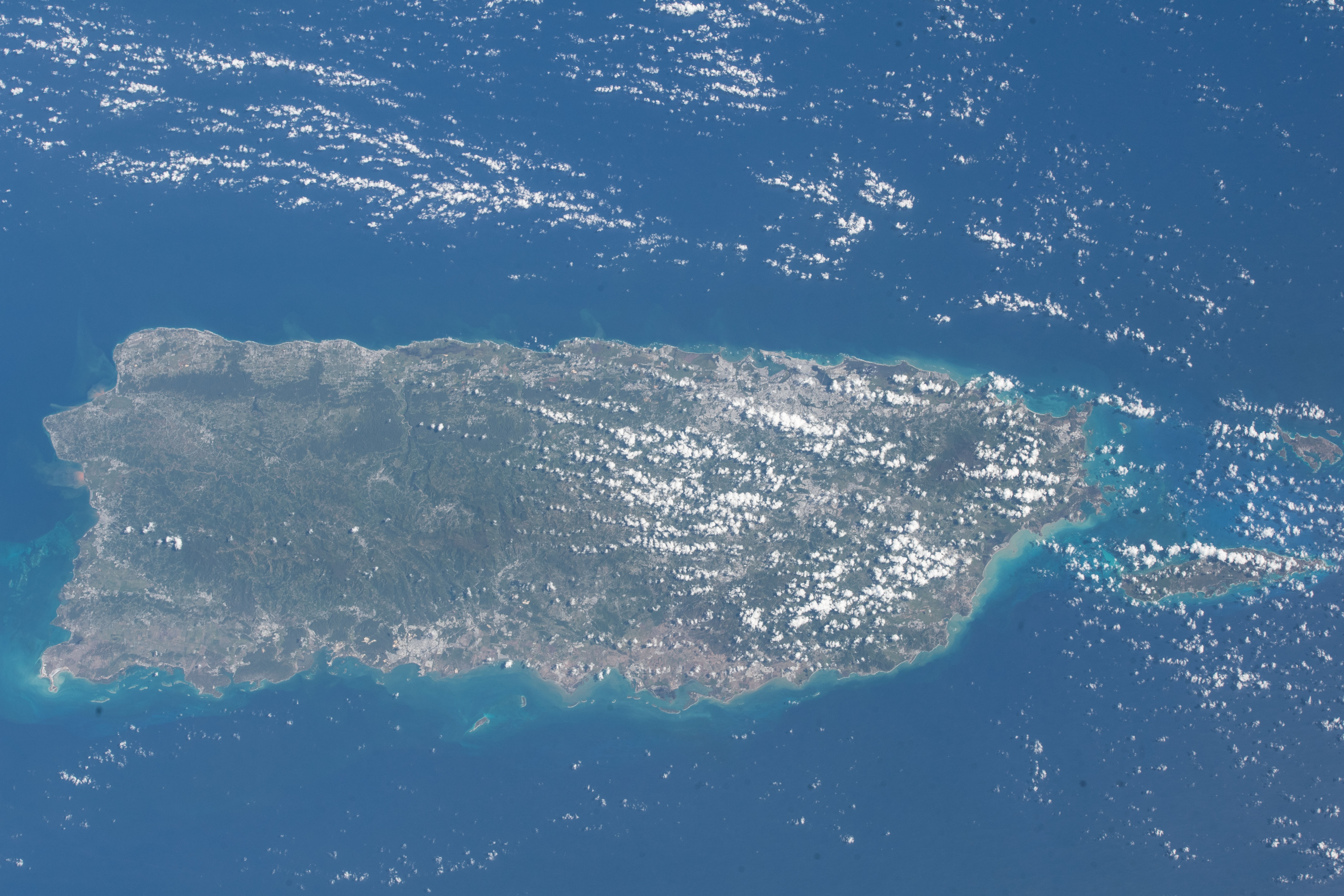
Satellite image of Puerto Rico, 2018

Around 60% mountainous, the main island of Puerto Rico has one principal mountain range covering the central region of the island from west to east, the Cordillera Central. It is divided into three subranges: the eponymous main subrange of Cordillera Central in the center, the Sierra de Cayey in the southeast, and the Sierra de Luquillo in the northeast. The highest elevation point in Puerto Rico, Cerro de Punta (4,390 feet or 1,338 meters), is located in the Cordillera Central, while El Yunque, one of the most popular peaks in Puerto Rico, located in the Sierra de Luquillo and part of El Yunque National Forest, has a maximum elevation of 3,540 feet (1,080 m).

The main island has seven valleys: Caguas, Yabucoa, Lajas, Añasco, the Coloso and Culebrinas, Cibuco, and Guanajibo. It has two narrow coastal plains: one stretching alongside the northern coast, and the other alongside the southern coast. The capital, San Juan, and its metropolitan area are located on the northern coastal plain in the northeast. It also has one prominent karst formation in its northwestern central region called the Northern Karst Belt, and two prominent batholiths, one in the southeastern municipality of San Lorenzo, and the other in the western municipality of Utuado. The island has 47 major rivers, of which the longest is Río de la Plata, and 26 reservoirs, lagoons, or lakes, among which is Laguna Grande (''big lagoon''), one of three bioluminescent bays in the archipelago of Puerto Rico located in the far northeastern municipality of Fajardo.

Puerto Rico has numerous protected nature areas, including the nature reserves of La Cordillera in the Vieques Sound, La Parguera in Lajas, and Caja Muertos in Caja de Muertos, the wildlife refuge in Culebra, Cabo Rojo and Desecheo, the estuarine research reserve of Bahía de Jobos in Salinas, and the national park of the El Yunque forest in Rio Grande.

== Topography ==
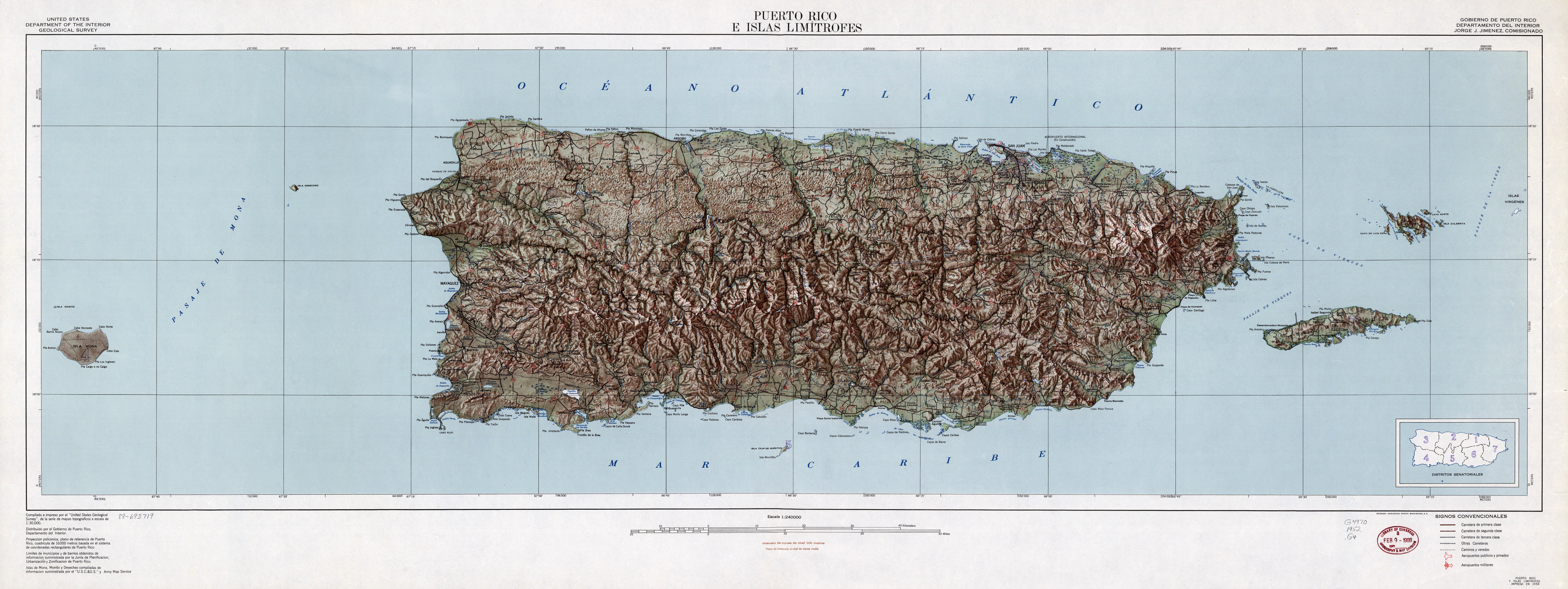
Topographic map of Puerto Rico, 1952

Puerto Rico is mostly mountainous with large coastal areas in the north and south. The main mountain range is called Cordillera Central (Central Mountain Range). The highest elevation in Puerto Rico, Cerro de Punta at 4,393 feet (1,339 m), is located in this range. Another important peak is El Yunque, the second highest peak in the Sierra de Luquillo at the El Yunque National Forest, with an elevation of 3,494 ft (1,065 m).

=== Geology ===
Puerto Rico is composed of Cretaceous to Eocene volcanic and plutonic rocks, which are overlain by younger Oligocene to recent carbonates and other sedimentary rocks. Most of the caverns and karst topography on the island occurs in the northern Oligocene to recent carbonates. The oldest rocks are approximately 190 million years old (Jurassic) and are located at Sierra Bermeja along the Lajas Valley in the southwest part of the island. These rocks may represent part of the oceanic crust and are believed to come from the Pacific Ocean realm. Puerto Rico lies at the boundary between the Caribbean and North American plates. This means that it is currently being deformed by the tectonic stresses caused by the interaction of these plates. These stresses may cause earthquakes and tsunamis. These seismic events, along with landslides, represent some of the most dangerous geologic hazards in the island and in the northeastern Caribbean. The most recent major earthquake occurred on October 11, 1918, with seismic moment estimated at 7.5 on the moment magnitude scale. It originated off the coast of Aguadilla and was accompanied by a tsunami.

Lying about 75 mi (121 km) north of Puerto Rico in the Atlantic Ocean at the boundary between the Caribbean and North American plates is the Puerto Rico Trench, the largest and deepest trench in the Atlantic. The trench is 1,090 mi (1,750 km) long and about 97 km (60 mi) wide. At its deepest point, named the Milwaukee Depth, it is 27,493 ft (8,380 m) deep, or about 5.21 mi (8.38 km).

== Physical geography ==
Puerto Rico is located between the Caribbean Sea and the North Atlantic Ocean, east of the Hispaniola and west of the Virgin Islands. Located in the northeastern Caribbean Sea, Puerto Rico was key to the Spanish Empire since the early years of exploration, conquest and colonization of the New World.

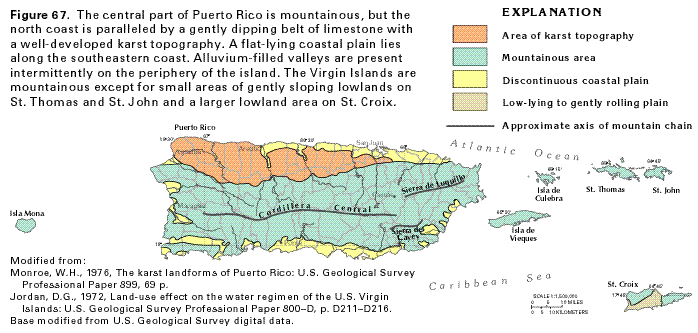
General physiographic map of Puerto Rico, with mountainous terrain in green, karst in orange, and plains in yellow

The topography of the main island is divided into three major regions: the mountainous region, which includes the Cordillera Central, the Sierra de Luquillo, and the Sierra de Cayey; the coastal plains; and the northern karst region. The Cordillera Central extends through the entire island, dividing it into the northern and southern regions. The mountain region accounts for approximately 60% of the land area.

The archipelago of Culebra, located east of Puerto Rico, north of Vieques, and west of the Virgin Islands, is composed of the island of Culebra and 28 uninhabited islets. Mainly mountainous, the island of Culebra possesses world-renowned beaches.

=== Climate ===
Located in the tropics, Puerto Rico enjoys an average temperature of 81 °F (27 °C) throughout the year. The seasons do not change very drastically. The temperature in the south is usually a few degrees higher than the north and temperatures in the central interior mountains are always cooler than the rest of the island. The highest temperature record was in the municipality of San Germán with 105 °F (40.6 °C) and the minimum registration is 39 °F (3.9 °C) in Aibonito. The dry season spans from December to April while the wet season coincides with the Atlantic hurricane season from May to November.

=== Rivers and lakes ===
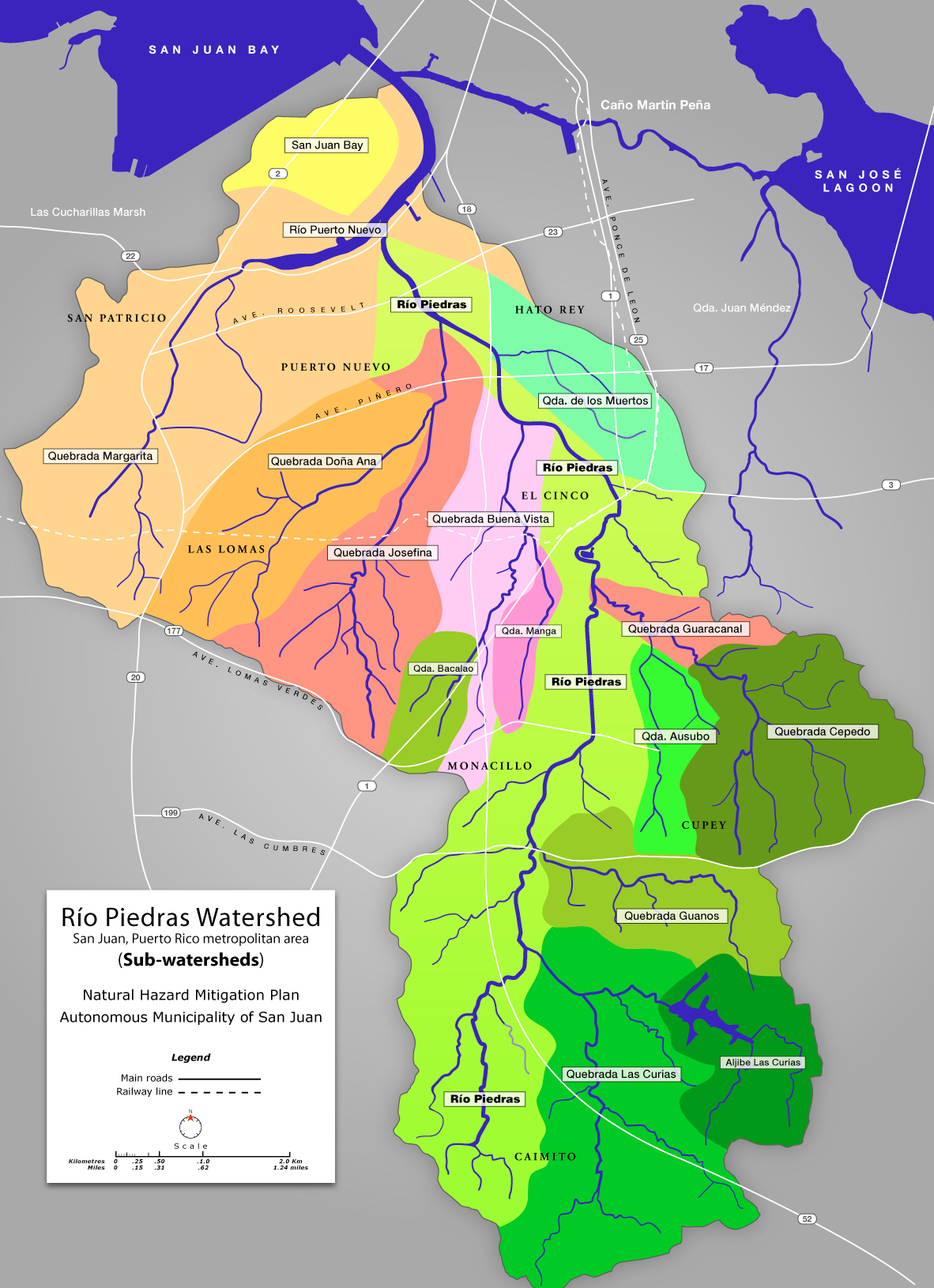
Map of the Río Piedras watershed, also known as the San Juan Bay Estuary Watershed (2015), and ends in the San Juan Bay

Puerto Rico has lakes (none of them natural) and more than 50 rivers. Most of these rivers are born in the Cordillera Central, Puerto Rico's principal mountain range located across the center of the island. The rivers in the north of the island are bigger and with higher flow capacity than those of the south. The south is thus drier and hotter than the north. These rivers make up 60 watersheds throughout the island, where over 95% of the runoff goes back to sea. With a length of length of approximately 74 kilometres (46 mi) La Plata River is the longest, while Loíza is the largest by discharge volume with a hydrological basin of 751 square kilometres (289.9 sq mi).

=== Flora and fauna ===
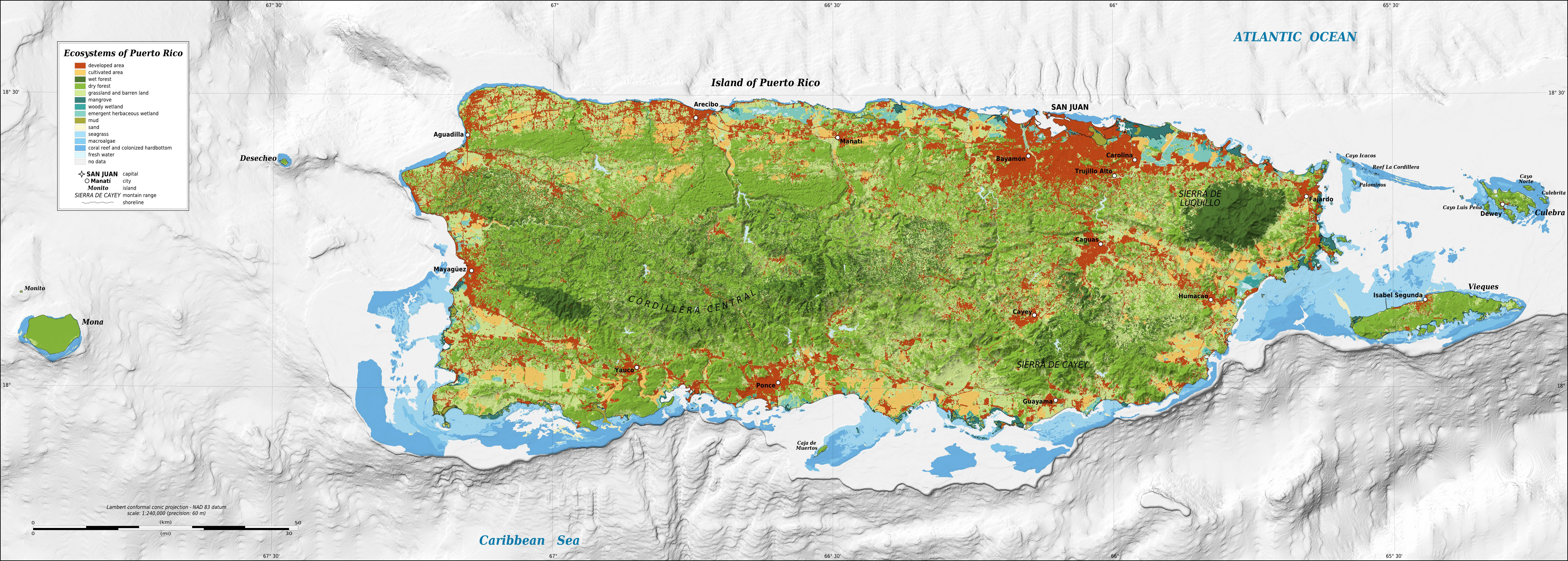
Map of the ecosystems of Puerto Rico

As of 1998, 239 plants, 16 birds and 39 amphibians/reptiles have been discovered that are endemic to the archipelago of Puerto Rico. The majority of these (234, 12 and 33 respectively) are found on the main island. The most recognizable endemic species and a symbol of Puerto Rican pride are the coquis (Eleutherodactylus spp.), small frogs easily recognized by the sound from which they get their name. El Yunque National Forest, a tropical rainforest, is home to the majority (13 of 16) of species of coqui. It is also home to more than 240 plants, 26 of which are endemic, and 50 bird species, including the critically endangered Puerto Rican amazon (Amazona vittata).

=== Forests ===
Forests of Puerto Rico are well represented by the flora of the Luquillo Experimental Forest (LEF), a Long Term Ecological Research Network site managed by the United States Forest Service and University of Puerto Rico. At this site, there are four main life zones, delineated on the basis of temperature and precipitation (Holdridge System), in the Sierra de Luquillo: subtropical wet and subtropical rain forests are found at low and mid elevations, lower montane rain and lower montane wet forests at high elevations. There is also an area of subtropical moist forest at low elevations on the southwest slope.

Tabonuco forest, so named for the dominant tabonuco tree (Dacryodes excelsa), covers lower slopes to about 2,000 ft (610 m). In well-developed stands the larger trees exceed 98 ft (30 m) in height, there is a fairly continuous canopy at 66 ft (20 m), and the shaded understory is moderately dense. Tabonuco trees are especially large on ridges, where they are firmly rooted in the rocky substrate and connected by root grafts with each other. There are about 168 tree species in the tabonuco forest.

The palo Colorado forest, named for the large palo colorado tree (Cyrilla racemiflora), begins above the tabonuco forest and extends up to about 3,000 ft (910 m). Its canopy reaches only about 49 ft (15 m). Soils are saturated and root mats above the soil are common. There are some 53 tree species in this forest type. At this same elevation, but in especially steep and wet areas, is palm forest, heavily dominated by the sierra palm tree (Prestoea montana). Patches of palm forest are also found in saturated riparian areas in the tabonuco forest. The palm forest reaches about 15 m in height.

At the highest elevations is dwarf forest, a dense forest as short as 9.8 ft (3.0 m), on saturated soils. Here the trees are covered with epiphytic mosses and vascular plants, especially bromeliads, and these also cover large areas of the ground. Ascending the Luquillo mountains through these forest types, the average tree height and diameter, number of tree species, and basal area (cross sectional area of tree stems) tend to decrease, while stem density increases.

There are more than 89 tree species in the LEF. The most common are Prestoea acuminata, Casearia arborea, Dacryodes excelsa, Manilkara bidentata, Inga laurina, and Sloanea berteroana. Common shrub species are Palicourea croceoides, Psychotria berteriana, and Piper glabrescens. Grasses, ferns, and forbs are frequent on the ground, especially in canopy gaps; epiphytes are fairly common, and vines are uncommon.

Puerto Rican dry forests are dominated by plants in the families Rubiaceae, Euphorbiaceae, and Myrtaceae. In this regard they are similar to Jamaican dry forests, but differ sharply from dry forests on the mainland of South and Central America, which are dominated by Fabaceae and Bignoniaceae.

=== Overview ===
Map of Puerto Rico's municipalities

As an unincorporated territory of the United States, Puerto Rico does not have any first-order administrative divisions as defined by the U.S. Government, but there are 78 municipalities at the second level. Municipalities are further subdivided into 902 barrios. Each municipality has a mayor and a municipal legislature elected for a 4-year term.

=== History ===
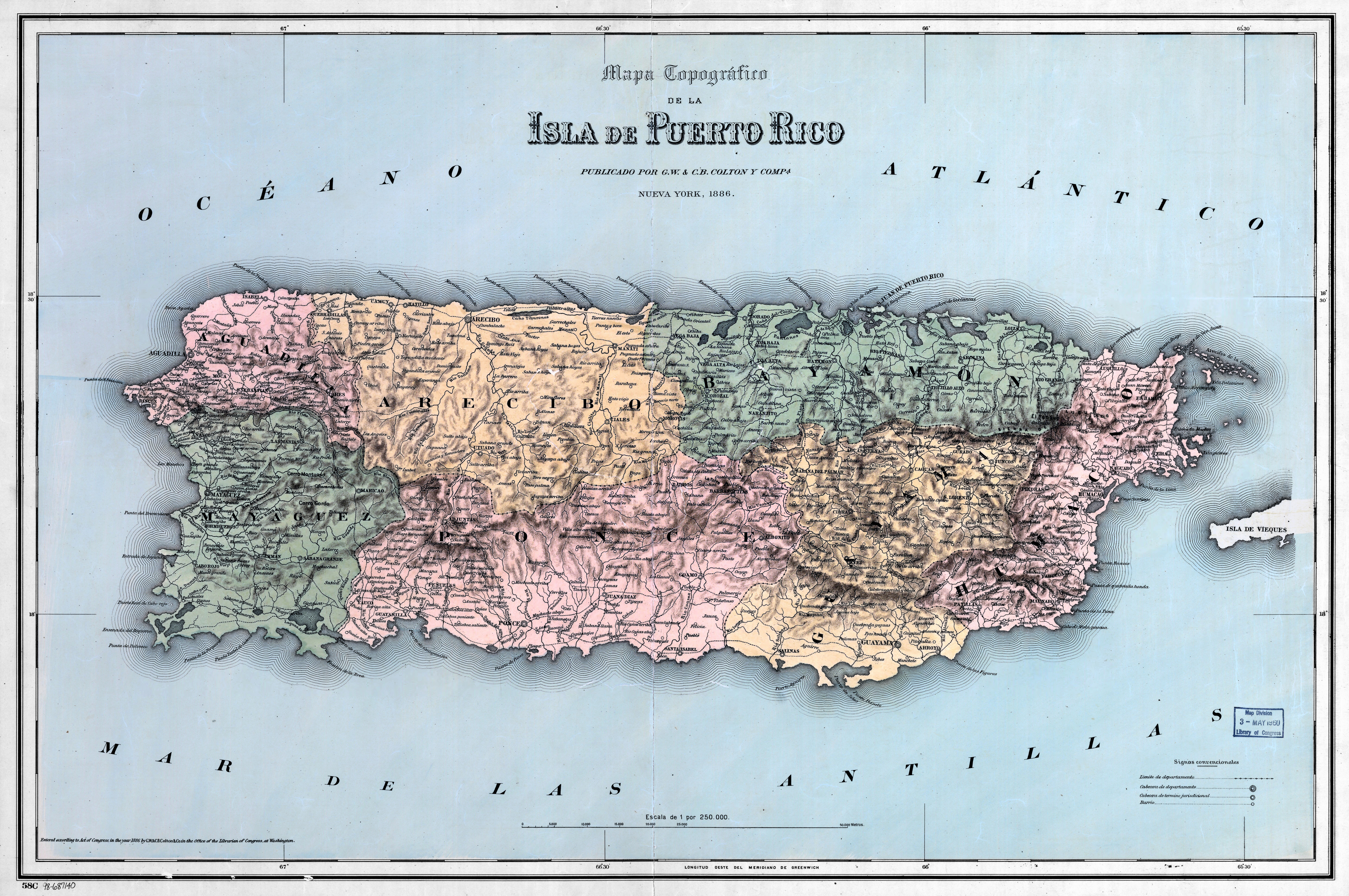
Map of Puerto Rico showing regional districts, 1886

The first permanent municipality of Puerto Rico, San Juan, was founded in 1521. In the 16th century two more municipalities were permanently established, Coamo (1570) and San Germán (1570). Three more municipalities were established in the 17th century. These were Arecibo (1614), Aguada (1692) and Ponce (1692). The 18th and 19th century saw an increase in settlement in Puerto Rico with 30 municipalities being established in the 18th century and 34 more in the 19th century. Only six municipalities were founded in the 20th century with the last, Florida, being founded in 1971.

Under Spanish rule, as of the 1880s, Puerto Rico was subdivided into regional districts (or "departamentos") that contained smaller ayuntamientos (municipalities).

Historical Administrative Divisions
| Regional District | Municipality | Notes |
|---|---|---|
| Aguadilla | Aguada, Aguadilla, Isabela, Lares, Moca, Rincón, San Sebastián | 7 municipalities |
| Arecibo | Arecibo, Barceloneta, Camuy, Ciales, Hatillo, Manatí, Morovis, Quebradillas, Utuado | 9 municipalities |
| Bayamón | Bayamón, Carolina, Corozal, Dorado, Loíza, Naranjito, Río Grande, Río Piedras, Toa Alta, Toa Baja, Trujillo Alto, Vega Alta, Vega Baja | 13 municipalities; Guaynabo ceased to be a municipality between 1875 and 1912 due to economic crises |
| Capital | San Juan | |
| Guayama | Aguas Buenas, Arroyo, Caguas, Cayey, Cidra, Comerío, Guayama, Gurabo, Juncos, Salinas, San Lorenzo | 11 municipalities; Comerío was founded as Sabana del Palmar, and San Lorenzo as Hato Grande |
| Humacao | Ceiba, Fajardo, Humacao, Las Piedras, Luquillo, Maunabo, Naguabo, Patillas, Vieques, Yabucoa | 10 municipalities |
| Mayagüez | Añasco, Cabo Rojo, Hormigueros, Lajas, Las Marías, Maricao, Mayagüez, Sabana Grande, San Germán | 9 municipalities |
| Ponce | Adjuntas, Aibonito, Barranquitas, Coamo, Guayanilla, Juana Díaz, Orocovis, Peñuelas, Ponce, Santa Isabel, Yauco | 11 municipalities; Orocovis was founded as Barros |

== Strategic geography ==
Since the European colonization of Puerto Rico in the early 1500s, the geographic location of the main island has been recognized for its strategic significance and accessibility. During the Age of Exploration and Sail, Puerto Rico was known to the Spanish as La Llave de las Indias (The Key to the Indies), as it was the closest European-settled major area of land in the Americas to both continental Europe and Africa with open access to the Atlantic Ocean. The northeast trade winds, coupled with the Canary, North Equatorial, and Antilles ocean currents, naturally made the main island the first major location to encounter en route to the Caribbean, North America, Central America, and South America, regions where the Spanish established their territories, often simply called the Indias (Indies).

In 1640, King Philip IV of Spain described Puerto Rico as:

"…siendo frente y vanguardia de todas mis Indias Occidentales, y respecto de sus consecuencias la más apreciada de ellas, y codiciada de los enemigos."

— Rey Felipe IV de España, 16 de Mayo de 1640

which, translated in English, reads as:

"…being the front and vanguard of all my West Indies, and with respect to its consequences, the most appreciated of them and coveted by the enemies."

— King Phillip IV of Spain, May 16, 1640

In 1643, the king reiterated the importance of Puerto Rico to the Spanish Empire as:

"…primera de las pobladas y principal custodia y llave de todas…"

— Rey Felipe IV de España, 20 de Agosto de 1643

which, translated in English, reads as:

"…first of the populated ones and principal custodian and key of all…"

— King Philip IV of Spain, August 20, 1643

As an unincorporated territory of the United States, the geostrategic location of Puerto Rico was paramount in the construction of the Panama Canal, and the defense of the Western Hemisphere against Nazi Operation Neuland in the Battle of the Caribbean during WWII. Puerto Rico is known as an American Gibraltar, or the Gibraltar of the Caribbean, as it stands guard over the entrance to the Caribbean Sea, itself a passageway into North, Central, and South America, just as British Gibraltar stands guard over the Strait of Gibraltar, the entrance to the Mediterranean Sea from the Atlantic Ocean. Like Hawaii in the middle of the Pacific Ocean, Puerto Rico in the middle of the Atlantic Ocean plays an important part for the continuation of American power abroad.

== Exclusive economic zone ==
Since 2007, the Dominican Republic in Hispaniola considers itself an archipelagic state, encroaching the long-established median or equidistance line dividing the EEZ of the Dominican Republic and Puerto Rico, and claiming portion of the EEZ claimed by the United States in relation to the archipelago of Puerto Rico, itself an unincorporated U.S. territory. The United States does not accept the archipelagic status and maritime boundaries claimed by the Dominican Republic. Victor Prescott, an authority in the field of maritime boundaries, argued that, as the coasts of both states are short coastlines with few offshore islands, an equidistance line is appropriate.

== Flora and fauna symbols ==
Symbols of Puerto Rico
- Amphibian: Coquí (Note: The Coquí is the animal most popularly recognized as a national symbol of Puerto Rico. It is a de facto national symbol of Puerto Rico.)
- Bird: Iguaca (Note: The Iguaca or Puerto Rican parrot is the de facto national bird of Puerto Rico, as it is the most recognized native bird of Puerto Rico. No bird has been officially declared by law. However, the legislative assembly of Puerto Rico approved the Puerto Rican tody as the official national bird of the archipelago in 2022. The proposal is pending on the scientific renaming of the bird as Todus borinquensis by the International Commission on Zoological Nomenclature (ICZN).)
- Flower: Maga (Note: The Maga is the official national flower of Puerto Rico.)
- Mammal: Manatee (Note: The Manatee is the official national mammal of Puerto Rico.)
- Tree: Ceiba (Note: The Ceiba is the de facto national tree of Puerto Rico.)
