= Virgin Islands =

Island group of the Caribbean Leeward Islands

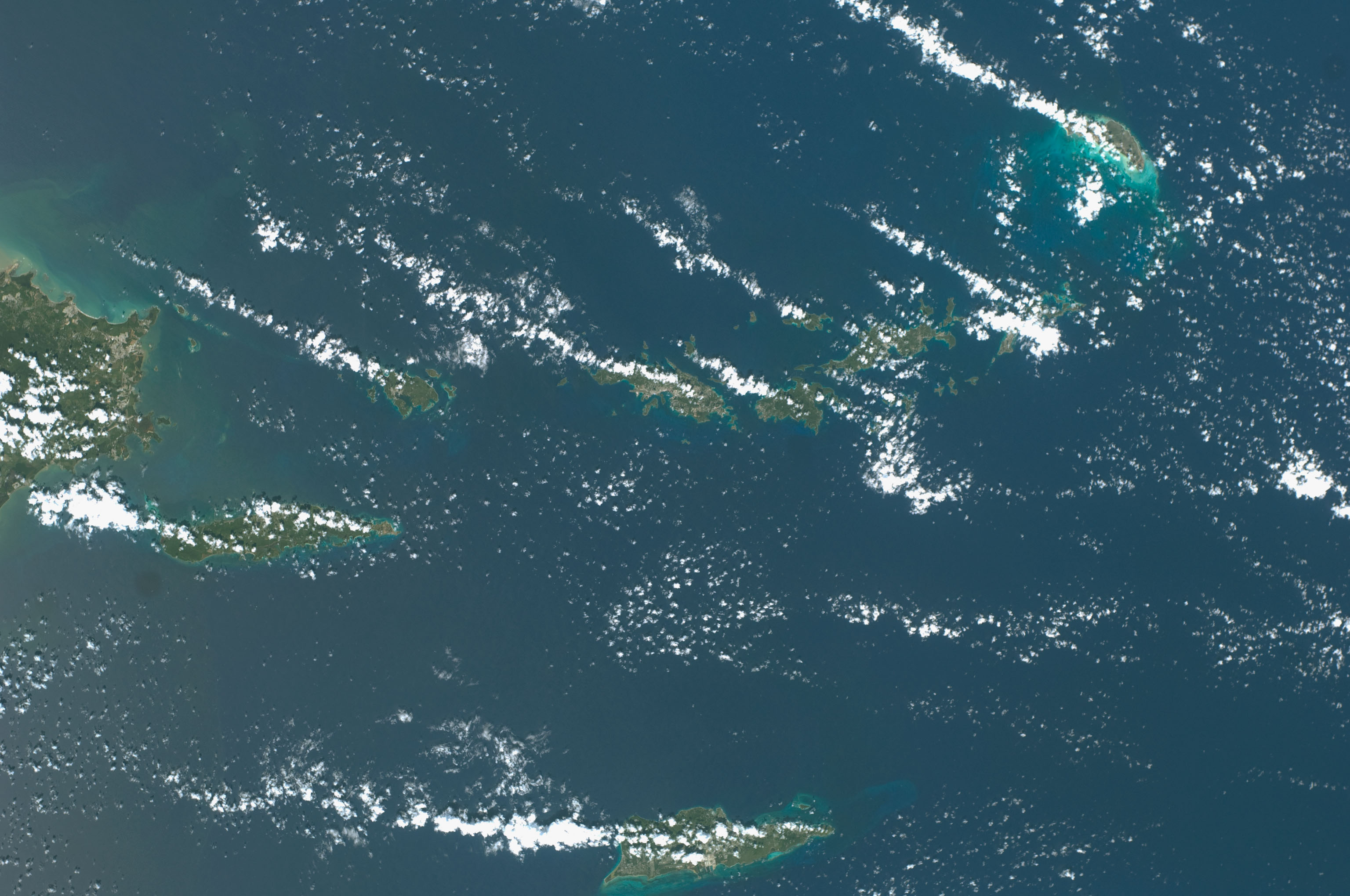
- Satellite image, October 2008 Puerto Rico Spanish Virgin Islands (Puerto Rico) United States Virgin Islands British Virgin Islands
- Interactive map of Virgin Islands

Geography
- Location: Caribbean Sea, Atlantic Ocean
- Coordinates: 18.2°N 64.8°W
- Archipelago: Leeward Islands
- United States
- Insular area: U.S. Virgin Islands
- Insular area: Puerto Rico
- United Kingdom
- Overseas territory: British Virgin Islands

Demographics
- Population: 150,000 (estimation) (2022)
- Languages: English; Virgin Islands Creole; Spanish
- Ethnic groups: Afro-Caribbean; White-Caribbean; Hispanic-Caribbean; Asian-Caribbean; Indo-Caribbean

The Virgin Islands (Spanish: Islas Vírgenes) is an archipelago between the North Atlantic Ocean and northeastern Caribbean Sea, located to the immediate east of the main island of Puerto Rico. It generally forms part of the Leeward Islands of the Lesser Antilles in the West Indies of the Caribbean region.

Geologically separated from the Lesser Antilles by the Anegada Passage and from the Greater Antilles by the Mona passage, all the islands except for Saint Croix lie on the same carbonate platform and insular shelf, known as the Puerto Rico Bank, and same tectonic plate, known as the Puerto Rico–Virgin Islands microplate.

Politically, the islands fall into three jurisdictions: the easternmost British overseas territory of the Virgin Islands, commonly referred to as the British Virgin Islands; the central unincorporated American territory of the Virgin Islands of the United States, commonly known as the U.S. Virgin Islands; and the westernmost island-municipalities of the unincorporated American territory of Puerto Rico, officially named Vieques and Culebra but generally called the Spanish Virgin Islands or Puerto Rican Virgin Islands.

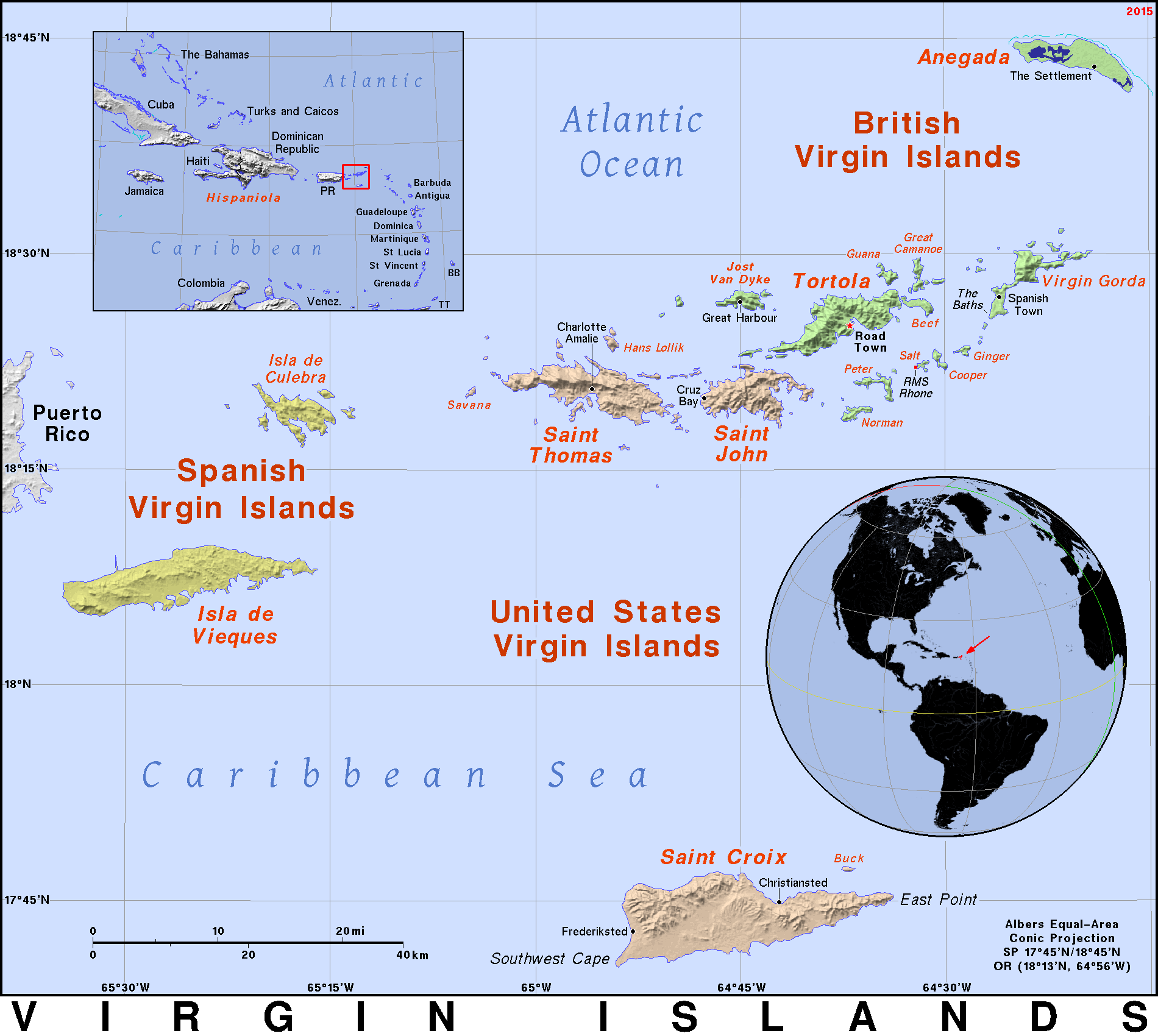
Political map of the Virgin Islands

== Etymology ==
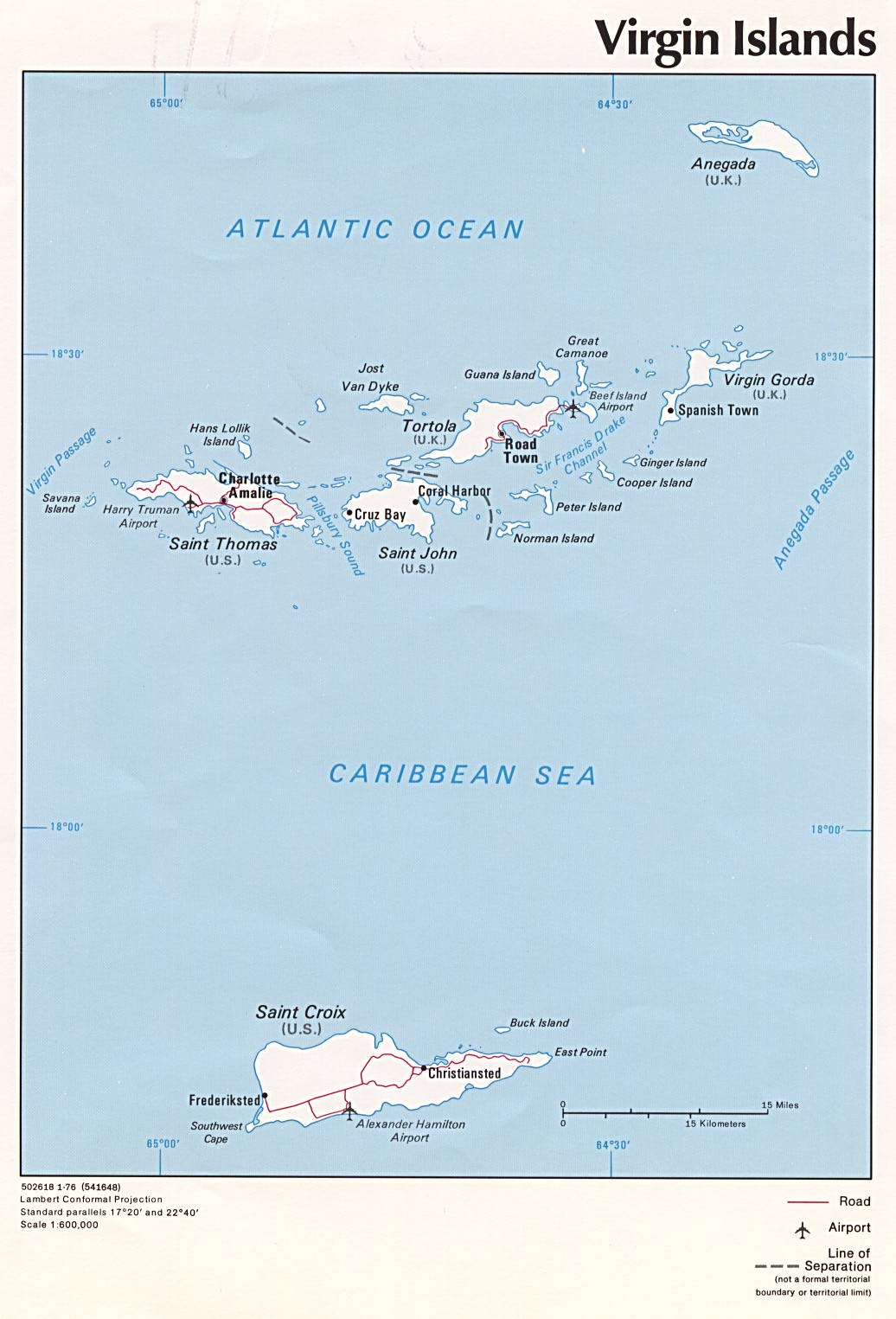
The locations of the US and UK Virgin Islands

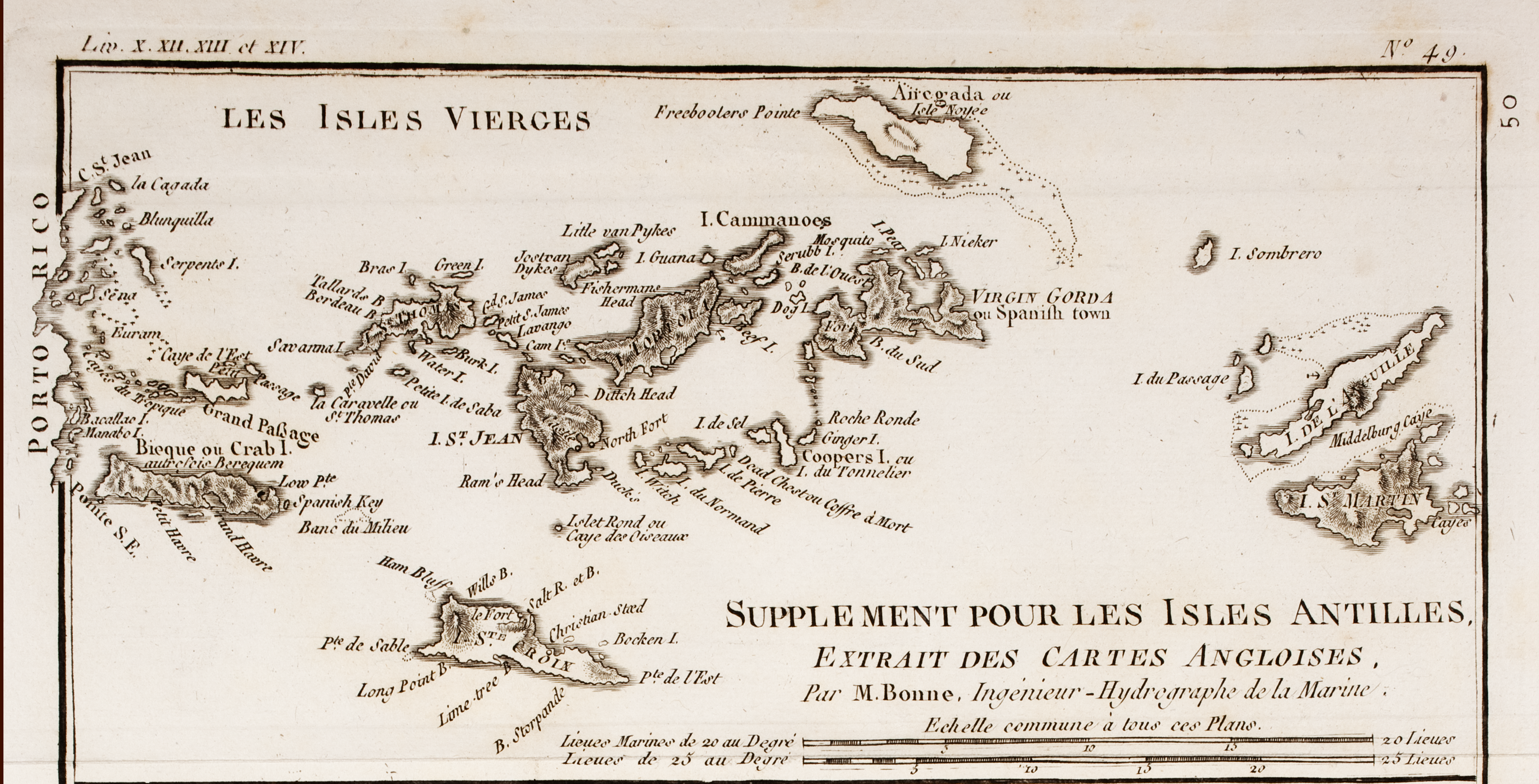
Rigobert Bonne: Map of the Virgin Islands, 1780

Christopher Columbus named the islands after Saint Ursula and the 11,000 Virgins (Spanish: Santa Úrsula y las Once Mil Vírgenes), shortened to the Virgins (las Vírgenes). The official name of the British territory is the Virgin Islands, and the official name of the U.S. territory is the Virgin Islands of the United States. In practice, the two island groups are almost universally referred to as the British Virgin Islands and the U.S. Virgin Islands.

== History ==
The Virgin Islands were originally inhabited by the Arawak and Carib, many of whom are thought to have perished during the colonial period due to enslavement, foreign disease, and war brought about by European colonists.

European colonists later settled here and established sugar plantations and at least one tobacco plantation, and brought slaves from Africa. The descendants of the enslaved people remain the bulk of the population, sharing a common African-Caribbean heritage with the rest of the English-speaking Caribbean.

Like Puerto Rico, the Virgin Islands that belonged to Spain were ceded to the United States in 1898. The United States took possession of the islands after the signing of the armistice that put an end to military operations in the Spanish–American War.

A 1916 treaty in-between the United States and Denmark (not ratified by the United States until 1917) resulted in Denmark selling the Danish West Indies to the United States for $25 million in gold.

=== Historical affiliations ===
The Virgin Islands have been under the sovereignty of several nations and groups throughout history. Below is a table which represents the affiliation of the various islands:

Rule began	present day U.S.V.I.				present day British V.I.				present day Spanish V.I. (P.R.)					Rule began
Rule began	St. Thomas	St. John	St. Croix		Tortola	Virgin Gorda	Anegada	Jost Van Dyke	Culebra	Vieques				Rule began
1493	New Spain	New Spain	New Spain		New Spain	New Spain	New Spain	New Spain	New Spain	New Spain				1493
1580	New Spain	New Spain	New Spain		New Spain	New Spain	New Spain	New Spain	Puerto Rico (ES)*	Puerto Rico (ES)*				1580
1625	Dutch Virgin Islands		British Leeward Islands**	Dutch Virgin Islands**					Puerto Rico (ES)*	Puerto Rico (ES)*				1625
1625	Dutch Virgin Islands		British Leeward Islands**	Puerto Rico (ES)**					Puerto Rico (ES)*	Puerto Rico (ES)*				1625
1628	Dutch Virgin Islands		British Leeward Islands**	Puerto Rico (ES)**		Dutch Virgin Islands			Puerto Rico (ES)*	Puerto Rico (ES)*				1628
1648	Dutch Virgin Islands		British Leeward Islands**	Puerto Rico (ES)**	Dutch Virgin Islands	Dutch Virgin Islands	Dutch Virgin Islands							1648
1650	Dutch Virgin Islands		British Leeward Islands**	Puerto Rico (ES)**	Dutch Virgin Islands	Dutch Virgin Islands	Dutch Virgin Islands							1650
1651	Danish West Indies		Knights Hospitaller		Dutch Virgin Islands	Dutch Virgin Islands	Dutch Virgin Islands							1651
1664	Danish West Indies		French West Indies		Dutch Virgin Islands	Dutch Virgin Islands	Dutch Virgin Islands							1664
1671	Danish West Indies	Danish West Indies	French West Indies		Dutch Virgin Islands	Dutch Virgin Islands	Dutch Virgin Islands							1671
1672	Danish West Indies	Danish West Indies	French West Indies		British Leeward Islands	Dutch Virgin Islands	Dutch Virgin Islands							1672
1680	Danish West Indies	Danish West Indies	French West Indies		British Leeward Islands	British Leeward Islands								1680
1684	Danish West Indies	British Leeward Islands	French West Indies		British Leeward Islands	British Leeward Islands								1684
1685	Brandenburg-Prussia***	British Leeward Islands	French West Indies		British Leeward Islands	British Leeward Islands								1685
1689	Brandenburg-Prussia***	British Leeward Islands	French West Indies		British Leeward Islands	British Leeward Islands				Brandenburg-Prussia				1689
1693	Brandenburg-Prussia***	British Leeward Islands	French West Indies		British Leeward Islands	British Leeward Islands				Puerto Rico (ES)				1693
1698	Brandenburg-Prussia***	British Leeward Islands	Danish West Indies		British Leeward Islands	British Leeward Islands				Puerto Rico (ES)				1698
1698	Brandenburg-Prussia***	British Leeward Islands	Danish West Indies		British Leeward Islands	British Leeward Islands				British Leeward Islands**	French West Indies**	Danish West Indies**	Scottish Darien Company	1698
1699	Brandenburg-Prussia***	British Leeward Islands	Danish West Indies		British Leeward Islands	British Leeward Islands				British Leeward Islands**	French West Indies**	Danish West Indies**		1699
1718	Brandenburg-Prussia***	Danish West Indies	Danish West Indies		British Leeward Islands	British Leeward Islands				British Leeward Islands**	French West Indies**	Danish West Indies**		1718
1733	Brandenburg-Prussia***	Danish West Indies	Danish West Indies		British Leeward Islands	British Leeward Islands				British Leeward Islands**	French West Indies**	Danish West Indies**		1733
1750	Brandenburg-Prussia***	Danish West Indies	Danish West Indies		British Leeward Islands	British Leeward Islands		British Leeward Islands		British Leeward Islands**	French West Indies**	Danish West Indies**		1750
1754		Danish West Indies	Danish West Indies		British Leeward Islands	British Leeward Islands		British Leeward Islands		British Leeward Islands**	French West Indies**	Danish West Indies**		1754
1801	British Leeward Islands				British Leeward Islands	British Leeward Islands		British Leeward Islands		British Leeward Islands**	French West Indies**	Danish West Indies**		1801
1802	Danish West Indies				British Leeward Islands	British Leeward Islands		British Leeward Islands		British Leeward Islands**	French West Indies**	Danish West Indies**		1802
1807	British Leeward Islands				British Leeward Islands	British Leeward Islands		British Leeward Islands		British Leeward Islands**	French West Indies**	Danish West Indies**		1807
1811	British Leeward Islands				British Leeward Islands	British Leeward Islands		British Leeward Islands						1811
1815	Danish West Indies				British Leeward Islands	British Leeward Islands		British Leeward Islands						1815
1816	Danish West Indies				British Virgin Islands									1816
1833	Danish West Indies				British Leeward Islands									1833
1898	Danish West Indies				British Leeward Islands				Puerto Rico (US)					1898
1917	United States Virgin Islands				British Leeward Islands				Puerto Rico (US)					1917
1958	United States Virgin Islands				British Virgin Islands				Puerto Rico (US)					1958

* Largely under control of pirates.

** Coexisting claim.

*** Leased/shared territory.

== Demographics ==
The total population of the Virgin Islands is 147,778: 87,146 in the U.S. Virgin Islands, 31,758 in the British, and 11,119 in the Spanish. Roughly three-quarters of islanders are black in the British and U.S. Virgin Islands, while the majority of inhabitants in Culebra and Vieques are Puerto Rican of European descent, with a significant Afro-Puerto Rican community. The main languages are English and Virgin Islands Creole in the U.S. and British Virgin Islands, and Spanish in the Puerto Rican territory. St. Thomas is the most populous island, with St. Croix close behind (51,634 and 50,601, respectively).

Name	Sovereign State	Subdivisions	Area (km^{2})	Population (2005 est.)	Population density (per km^{2})	Capital
British Virgin Islands	United Kingdom	Districts	153.0	31,758	207.6	Road Town
Spanish Virgin Islands (Puerto Rico)	United States	Barrios	165.1	11,119	67.3	San Juan, PR
United States Virgin Islands	United States	Districts	346.4	104,901	302.8	Charlotte Amalie
Total			664.5	147,778	222.4	

== Traffic control ==
Motor vehicles are driven on the left-hand side of the road in both the British and the U.S. Virgin Islands, although the steering wheels on most cars are located on the left side (as is the norm for drive-on-the-right localities). In the Spanish Virgin Islands, vehicles are driven on the right-hand side of the road.

== See also ==
- Culture of the Virgin Islands
- Danish Virgin Islands
- Dutch Virgin Islands
- Music of the Virgin Islands
- Virgin Islands Creole
- Virgin Islands patch reefs

== General sources ==
- Colin Thomas, J.; Allard, William Albert; Wolinsky, Cary (February 1981). "Paradise Comes of Age: The U.S. Virgin Islands". National Geographic. Vol. 159, no. 2. pp. 225–243.
