= Noroit Seamount =

Seamount in the Caribbean Sea

Noroit Seamount Noroît Seamount
- Location within Lesser Antilles Location within the Caribbean

Location
- Location: Anegada Passage; Caribbean
- Coordinates: 18°11′00″N 64°04′00″W
- Country: British Virgin Islands; Anguilla

Geology
- Type: submarine volcano

Noroit Seamount is a seamount in the Caribbean Sea, in the Anegada Passage. It is also spelled Noroît Seamount after the French survey and research vessel RV Le Noroît (IMO number: 7035717) which was operated by IFREMER. It is also known as Noroit Knoll. Several research projects are conducted in vicinity of Noroit Seamount.

== Geology ==
The seamount is a (relatively young) inactive submarine volcano, located on the boundary between the North American Plate and the Caribbean Plate.

== Flora and fauna ==
Noroît Seamount's marine habitats are well researched. Investigations by the research vessel EV Nautilus in 2014 found a variety of stony corals (scleractinians), octocorals, and sponges. Corals created habitat for brittle stars, squat lobsters and sea snails. In the sea depth there are variety of fish — Acanthonus armatus, Bathypterois phenax, Bembrops, Conger esculentus, Coryphaenoides, Hexanchus griseus, Lepidion, Luciobrotula corethromycter, and Polymixia lowei.
