= Morne la Vigie =

Extinct cinder cone in Haiti

- Location within Haiti

Highest point
- Elevation: 2,276 ft (694 m)
- Coordinates: 18°47′N 72°17′W

Geography
- Location: Saut-d'Eau, Centre, Haiti

Geology
- Rock age: 1.5
- Mountain type: Cinder cone
- Last eruption: around 400,000 years

Morne la Vigie (French pronunciation: [mɔʁn la viʒi]) is an extinct scoria cone, located 9.4 km from the commune of Saut-d'Eau and 21 km from Port-au-Prince, it was active from Pleistocene until around the 400,000 years ago.
