= Anegada Passage =

Strait in the Caribbean

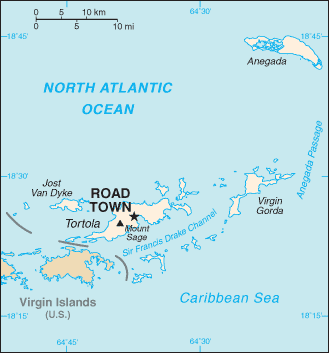
- Map of the British Virgin Islands, with the Anegada Passage labeled at right side.

- Location within Lesser Antilles Location within the Caribbean
- Location: British Virgin Islands; Anguilla
- Coordinates: 18°22′41″N 63°50′15″W
- Max. length: 104 kilometres (65 mi)
- Max. width: 127 kilometres (79 mi)
- Average depth: 2,300 metres (7,500 ft)

The Anegada Passage /ˌænəˈɡɑːdə/, also known as the Anegada Trough, is a strait in the Caribbean that separates the British Virgin Islands and the British ruled Sombrero Island of Anguilla, and connects the Caribbean and the Atlantic Ocean. It is 2300 m deep. Because the threshold depths are 1800 and 1600 m, Atlantic deep water from 1600 m level may flow into the deep areas in the Caribbean Sea.

The Anegada Passage is a key shipping lane for the Panama Canal. It is considered a difficult passage for sailors because of the winds, waves, and swells.

The Anegada Passage was the site of the 1867 Virgin Islands earthquake and subsequent tsunami.

== Geographic extent ==
The multiple fault lines, ridges, and basins, including the Virgin Islands Basin, Anegada Gap, and Sombrero Basin, that form part of the general trough stretching from the southeastern Puerto Rican mainland in the Caribbean Sea to the northeastern British Virgin Island of Anegada in the North Atlantic Ocean are often collectively grouped under the name of Anegada Passage or Trough.

== See also ==
- Noroit Seamount
