= Desecheo National Wildlife Refuge =

National Wildlife Refuge in Puerto Rico

- IUCN category Ia (strict nature reserve)
- Location within Puerto Rico
- Location: Mayagüez, Puerto Rico, Caribbean
- Coordinates: 18°23′20″N 67°28′30″W
- Area: 360 acres (1.5 km^{2})
- Established: 1976
- Governing body: U.S. Fish and Wildlife Service
- Website: Desecheo National Wildlife Refuge

The Desecheo National Wildlife Refuge (Spanish: Refugio Nacional de Vida Silvestre de Desecheo) is a National Wildlife Refuge in Puerto Rico. The island of Desecheo is located 14 miles (23 km) west of Puerto Rico and is bounded by the Atlantic Ocean on the north and the Caribbean Sea on the south. The refuge encompasses the entire rugged island. It is part of the Caribbean Islands National Wildlife Refuge Complex.

From 1940 to 1952, Desecheo was used as a practice target for aerial bombardment by the United States Department of War, and from 1952 to 1960, the island was used as a survival training area for the United States Air Force. Despite formerly containing a colony of 15,000 brown boobies and 10,000 red-footed boobies, currently no successful booby breeding is known to occur on the island. Other seabird species also use the island. Additional species of interest include three endemic species of lizards, the endangered higo chumbo cactus and hawksbill sea turtles. Feral goats became established on the island in the 18th century, and in 1966, the National Institutes of Health introduced 56 rhesus monkeys to be later culled for medical research. No public use is allowed on the island because of safety considerations associated with unexploded ordnance that remain on the refuge. Desecheo is often used as a drop-off point for smuggling and illegal immigration.

== Ecology ==
Desecheo is covered by xeric shrubs, distinctive of the Puerto Rican dry forest ecoregion. The flora of the island has been greatly affected by the introduction of invasive species, such as goats during the 18th century.

=== Conservation and restoration ===
Before the introduction of invasive rats, the island hosted large colonies of breeding seabirds, including the largest brown booby colony in the Caribbean region and an important red-footed booby colony. But, due to the destruction of native vegetation and predation on eggs and chicks by invasive rats and rhesus macaques, seabirds nesting was reduced significantly on Desecheo and many plants and animals were threatened.

In response to this threat, the United States Fish and Wildlife Service (USFWS), Island Conservation, and other key partners, including the United States Department of Agriculture (USDA), the Puerto Rico Department of Natural and Environmental Resources (DNER), Bell Laboratories, and Tomcat, eradicated the invasive vertebrates providing significant benefits for seabirds, the island’s endemic lizards, three endemic arachnids, the federally threatened higo chumbo cactus and other native plants. In July 2017, one year after the final phase of this ambitious operation, conservation biologists confirmed that these predators are absent from the island, and the operation was declared a success. This project, the largest conservation operation of its kind to date in the region, aims to return the island to its former status as the most important seabird colony in the region. In February 2018, USFWS, Island Conservation and Effective Environmental Restoration Inc (EER) with support from the National Fish and Wildlife Foundation and the National Geographic Society initiated a seabird social attraction project to encourage bridled terns, brown noddies, and Sargasso shearwaters to nest on the island. The teams established seabird colonies using decoy, mirrors, and sound systems playing recorded bird calls to make it appear as if the birds were already on the island in an attempt to revive the once-thriving seabird colony.
