= Desecheo Island =

Uninhabited island of Puerto Rico

Desecheo
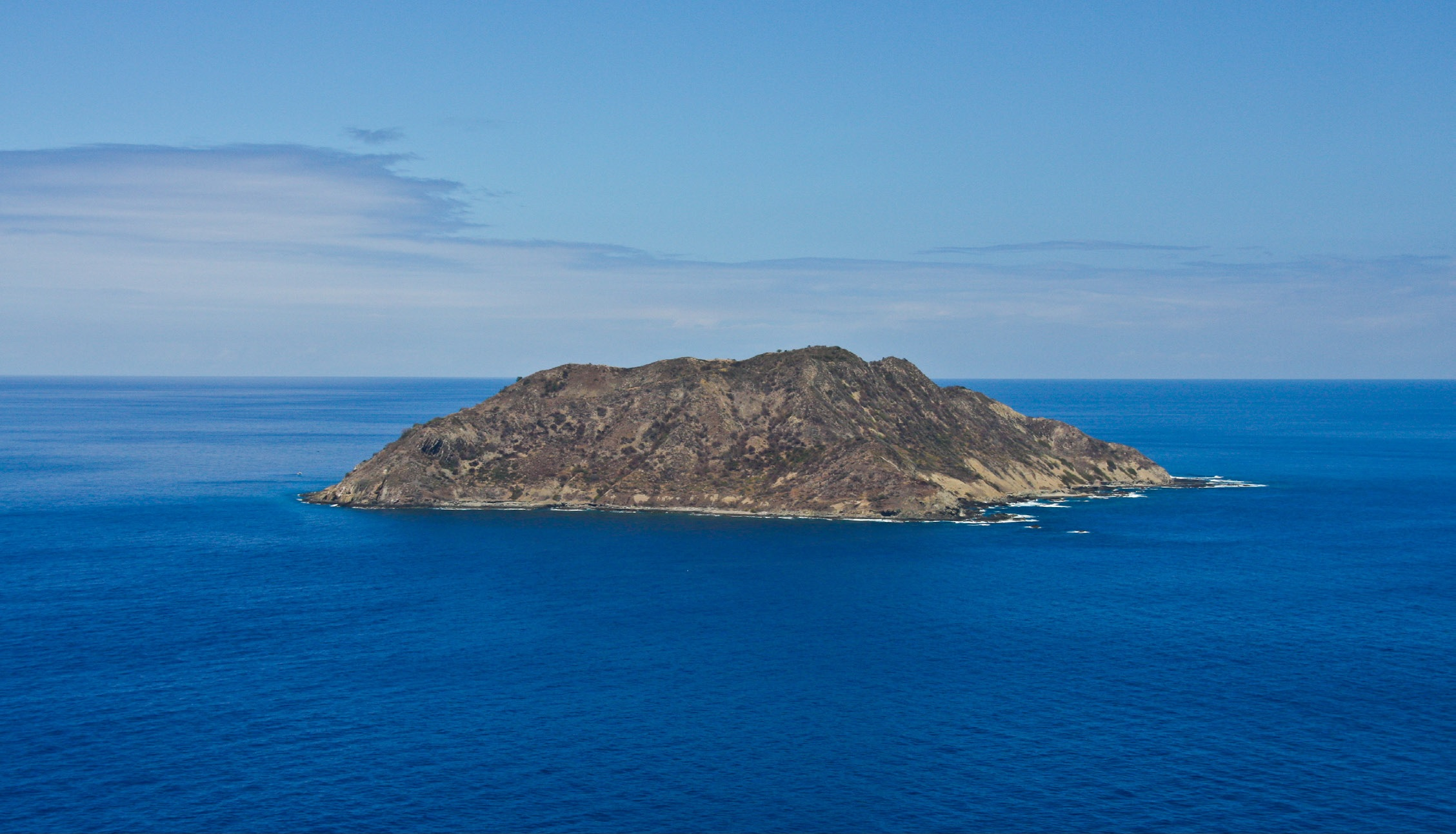
- Profile of Desecheo Island from the municipality of Rincón

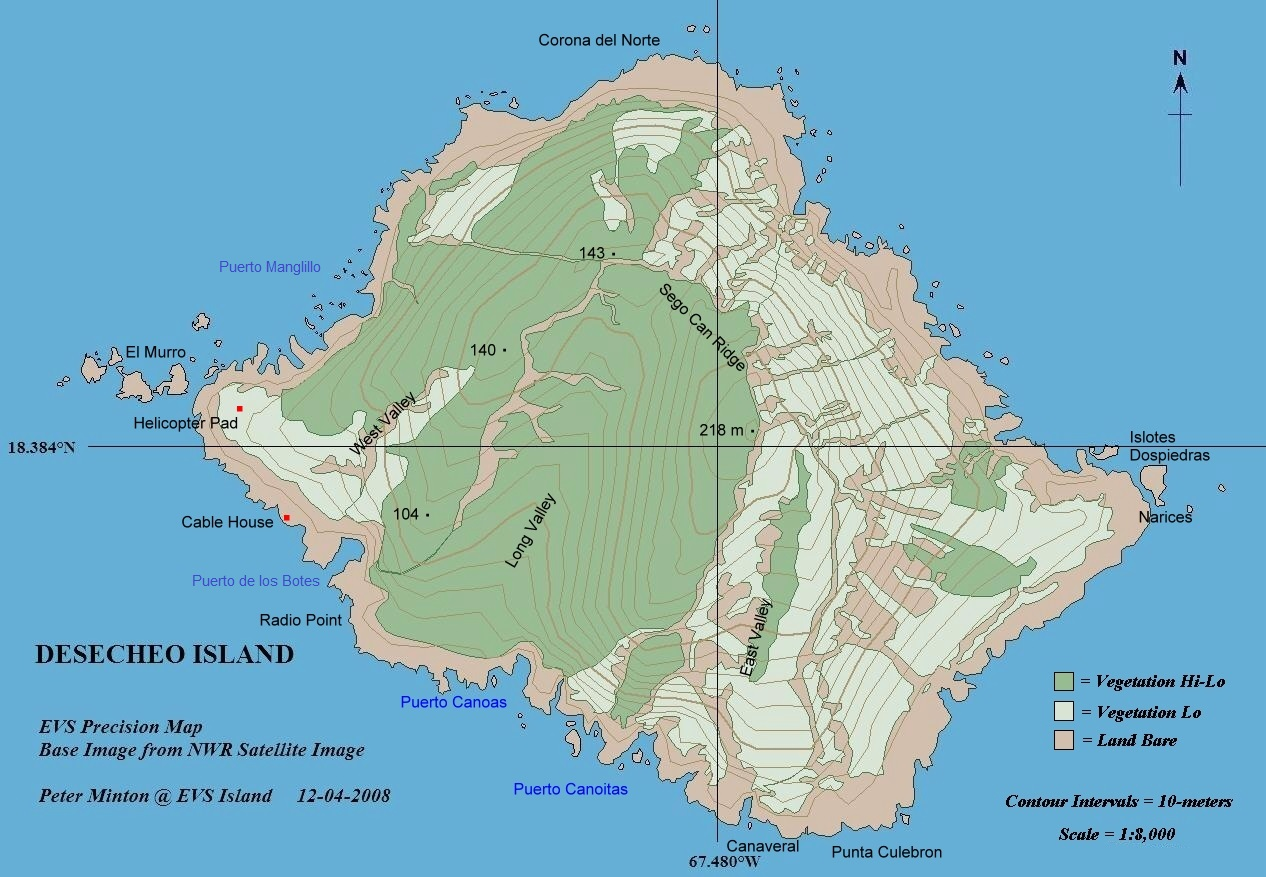
- Map of Desecheo Island

- Location within Puerto Rico Location within Lesser Antilles Location within the Caribbean

Geography
- Coordinates: 18°23′14″N 67°28′19″W
- Area: 1.524613 km^{2} (0.588656 sq mi)
- Length: 1.8 km (1.12 mi)
- Width: 1.1 km (0.68 mi)
- Highest elevation: 218 m (715 ft)
- Highest point: Sego Can Ridge

Administration
- United States; Puerto Rico
- Commonwealth: Puerto Rico
- Municipio: Mayagüez
- Barrio: Sabanetas

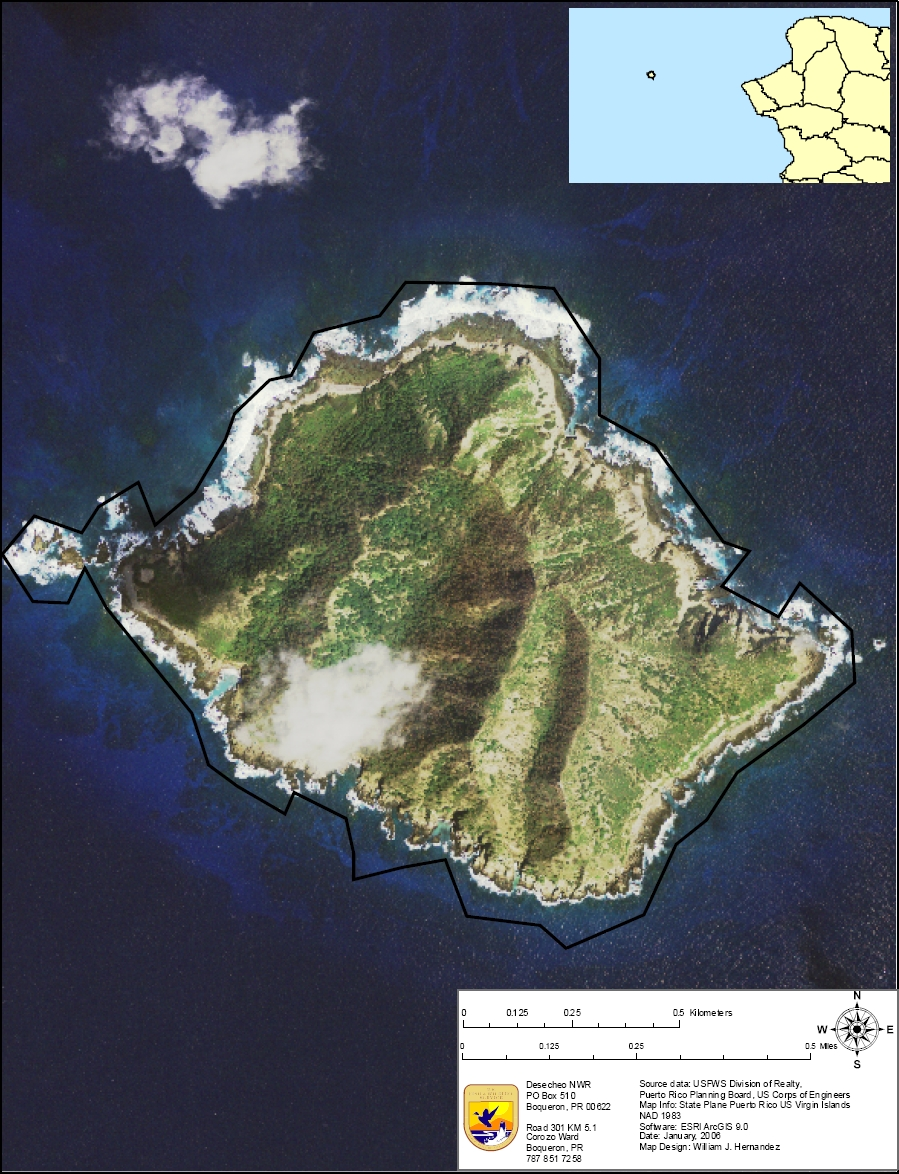
Satellite image

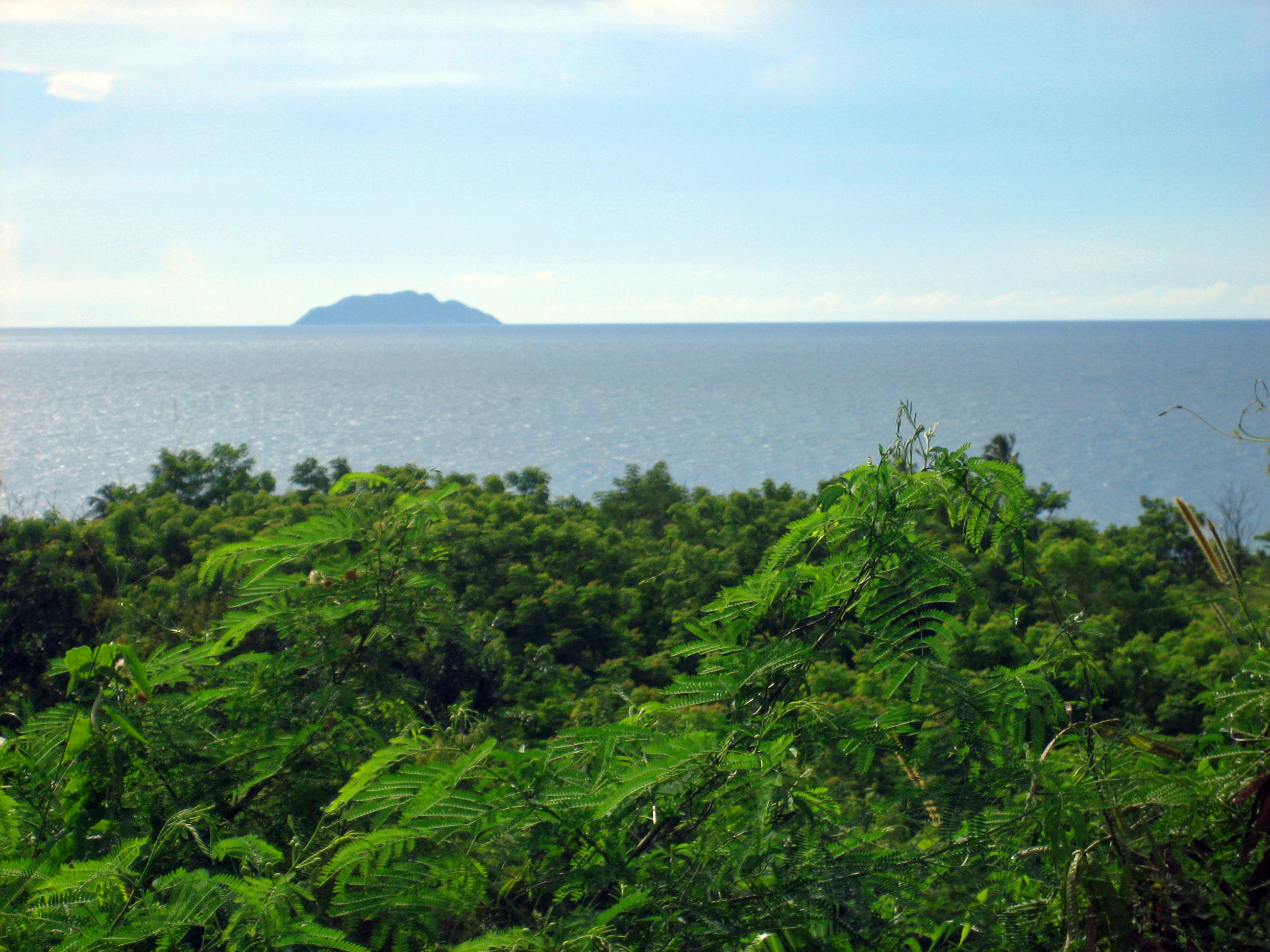
Desecheo from Rincón

Desecheo (Spanish pronunciation: [deseˈtʃeo] DES-ə-CHAY-oh) is a small uninhabited island of the archipelago of Puerto Rico in the northeast of the Mona Passage; 13 mi (21 km) from the municipality of Rincón on the west coast (Punta Higüero) of the main island of Puerto Rico and 31 mi (50 km) northeast of Mona Island. It has a land area of 0.589 sq mi (377 acres; 153 ha; 1.53 km^{2}). Politically, the island is administered by the U.S. Department of the Interior, U.S. Fish and Wildlife Service as the Desecheo National Wildlife Refuge, but part of the Sabanetas barrio of Mayagüez.

== Flora and fauna ==
Desecheo, which has no known bodies of surface water, reaches a maximum elevation of 715 ft (218 m) and has an annual precipitation, on average, of 40.15 in (1020 mm). The lack of surface water limits its flora to thorny shrubs, small trees, weeds and various cacti, including the endangered higo chumbo (Harrisia portoricensis). Fauna includes various species of seabirds, three endemic species of lizard (Pholidoscelis desechensis, Anolis desechensis and Sphaerodactylus levinsi), introduced goats and rats, and a population of rhesus monkeys (Macaca mulatta) introduced from Cayo Santiago in 1967 as part of a study on adaptation. Before the introduction of rhesus monkeys the island was the largest nesting colony of the brown booby.

== Geology ==
Although politically part of Puerto Rico, along with the islands of Mona and Monito, Desecheo is not geologically related to the main island. It is believed that the island has been isolated, at least, since the Pliocene. However, the island is part of the Rio Culebrinas formation which suggests that it was once connected to Puerto Rico.

== History ==
No evidence of Pre-Columbian human settlement of the island has been uncovered. Christopher Columbus was the first European to visit the island during his second voyage to the New World; however, it was not named until 1517 by Spanish explorer Nuñez Alvarez de Aragón. During the 18th century the island was used by smugglers, pirates and bandits to hunt imported feral goats. During World War II, and until 1952, the island was used as a bombing range by the United States Armed Forces. From 1952 to 1964 the United States Air Force used Desecheo for survival training. In 1976 administration of the island was given to the U.S. Fish and Wildlife Service and in 1983 it was designated as a National Wildlife Refuge. In 2000 it received a Marine reserve designation and fishing is allowed within 1/2-mile around the island.

On May 12, 2022, 11 Haitian migrants died, 31 were rescued and others were feared missing, near Desecheo Island after their boat capsized on its way to Puerto Rico, from Haiti.

== Conservation and restoration ==
In the early 1900s, Desecheo NWR was still a major nesting ground for thousands of seabirds. Approximately 15,000 brown boobies, 2,000 red-footed boobies (Sula sula), 2,000 brown noddies (Anous stolidus), 1,500 bridled terns (Onychoprion anaethetus), and hundreds of magnificent frigatebirds (Fregata magnificens), laughing gulls (Larus atricilla), and sooty terns (Onychoprion fuscatus) nested here.

Invasive mammals, including goats and rats, began to impact Desecheo NWR early in the 20th century. Around and during the time of World War II, the island was used as an artillery range by the US Air Force. That and the invasive species’ damage to Desecheo's ecosystem have been severe, and by the turn of the millennium, virtually no seabirds were using the refuge. In response, in 2016 the US Fish and Wildlife Service (USFWS), Island Conservation, and other key partners, including the US Department of Agriculture (USDA), and Bell Laboratories and Tomcat, worked together to remove invasive black rats and Rhesus macaques from the island.

One year later Desecheo Island was declared free of invasive species, and signs of recovery were observed, including Sargasso shearwaters sighted on the island for the first time and new bridled tern nests discovered. In addition, 72 Federally protected Higo Chumbo cactus, (Harrisia portoricensis), were found and measured pre (2003–2010) and post eradication (2017). In 2017, individuals with flowers and huge yellow fruits were observed which is a good sign for the overall reproductive status of the population.

Since 2018 social attraction equipment has been installed to augment bridled tern and brown noddy colonies and establish a species of conservation concern, the Sargasso shearwater. In 2023, the first sargasso shearwater nest since mammal eradication was confirmed on the island.

== Diving ==
Because of a healthy reef and clear waters, with common visibility ranging from 98 to 148 feet (30 to 45 m), Desecheo is a very popular place for diving enthusiasts. Although diving is permitted around the island, the refuge is closed to the public due to the presence of unexploded military ordnance. Trespassers are subject to arrest by Federal law enforcement officers.

== Amateur radio ==
As a separately administered area, under amateur radio rules Desecheo is considered a distinct "entity" for DXCC award purposes. Several DXpeditions have gone to the island, which has the ITU prefix KP5 (although since there is no permanent mailing address there the Federal Communications Commission does not actually grant this callsign). The Fish & Wildlife Service currently restricts such operations.

The first approved DXpedition in fifteen years was allowed on the island between February 12 and 26, 2009, making 115,787 contacts.

Attempts to allow public access to Desecheo and the island of Navassa, which is located between Haiti and Jamaica, were made in the U.S. Congress, but the bill failed to reach the floor of the House of Representatives prior to the end of the 109th Congress, rendering the proposal dead.

A team of operators is activating Desecheo in January 2026 using solar-charged batteries, to reduce the environmental footprint.

== See also ==
- Geography of Puerto Rico
- Islands of Puerto Rico
