= Barton Point Nature Reserve =

Nature reserve in the British Indian Ocean Territory

Coordinates: 07°14′11″S 72°26′15″E

Barton Point Nature Reserve is one of eight strict nature reserve in the British Indian Ocean Territory. It is located on Diego Garcia, the largest atoll in the Chagos Archipelago, and covers an area of 680 ha at the northern end of the eastern side of the atoll.

Since 1994, Barton Point has been part of the Diego Garcia Restricted Area and entry to the reserve is controlled by the British Indian Ocean Territory administration. It is one of 10 Important Bird Areas within the territory and includes a breeding colony of red-footed boobies.

== Geography ==
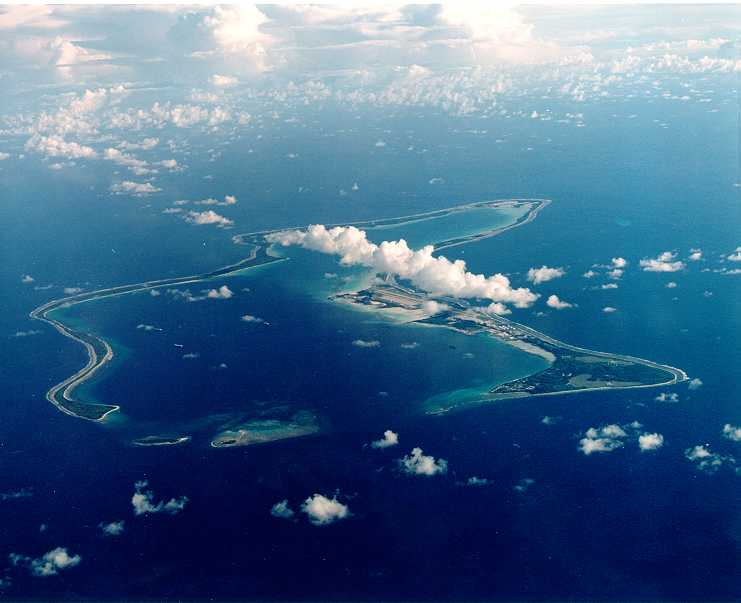
Aerial view of Diego Garcia atoll from the north-west, with Barton Point at lower left

The Chagos Archipelago, which comprises the British Indian Ocean Territory, is located in the Indian Ocean, around 500 kilometres (310 mi) south of the Maldives and 2,100 kilometres (1,300 mi) northeast of Mauritius. Diego Garcia is the largest atoll within the archipelago and Barton Point Nature Reserve sits at the northern end of the eastern side of the atoll.

== History ==
In 1994, the British Indian Ocean Territory established the Diego Garcia Restricted Area to protect the biodiversity of the atoll. Barton Point is included within the restricted area which requires a permit to access.

Under the Chagos Conservation Management Plan published by the British Indian Ocean Territory and the Foreign and Commonwealth Office in 2003, Barton Point is designated as a Special Conservation Area.

Barton Point is one of eight strict nature reserve and one of 10 Important Bird Areas within the archipelago.

== Nature and conservation ==
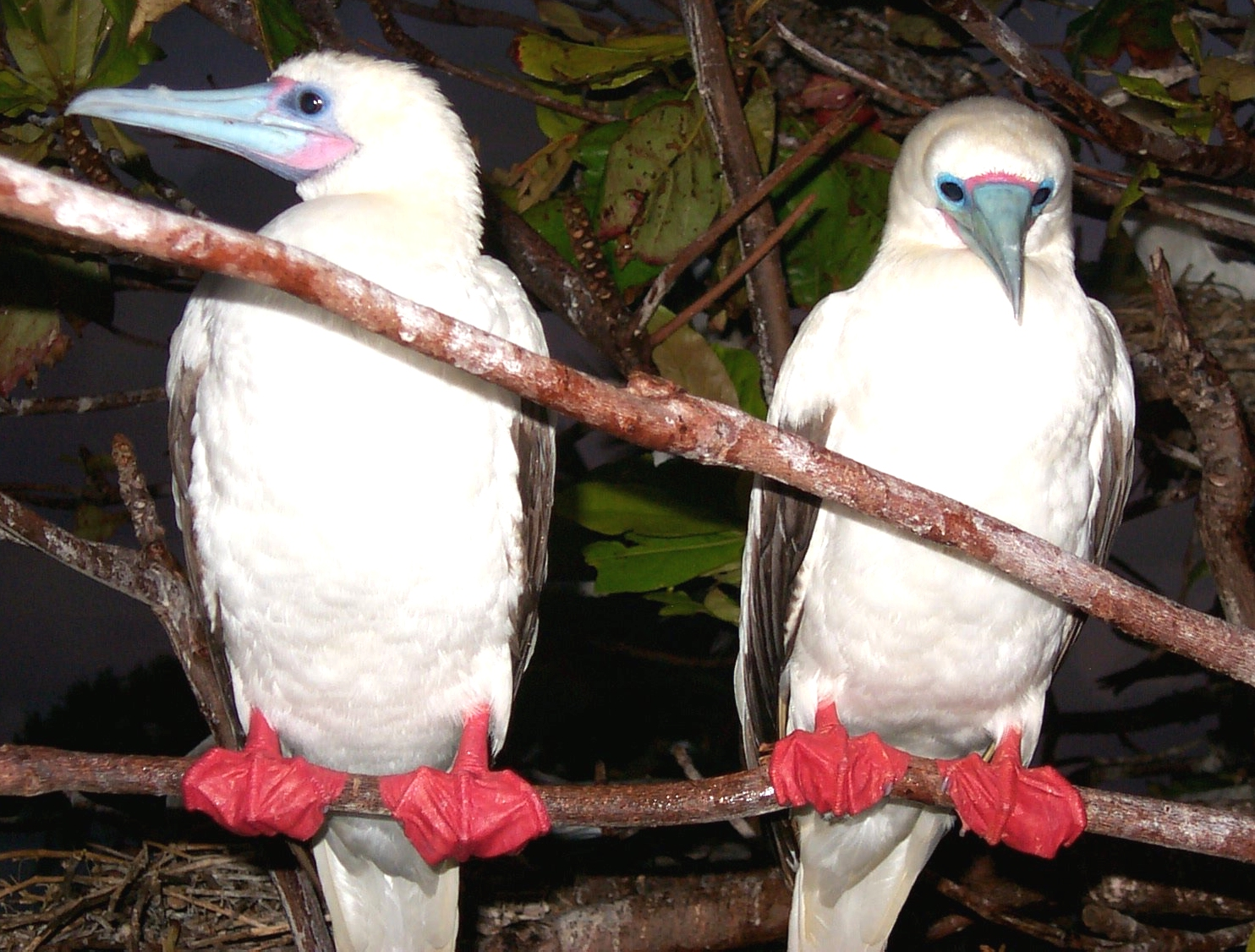
The reserve is an important site for red-footed boobies

It holds a breeding colony of red-footed boobies, with over 16,000 pairs recorded in a 2004 survey, for which it was identified as an Important Bird Area by BirdLife International.

The reserve is also the site of the Barton Point Atoll Restoration Project, a pilot scheme to remove introduced and invasive coconut palms and replant native hardwood trees.
