= Island restoration =

Ecological restoration of islands and island groups

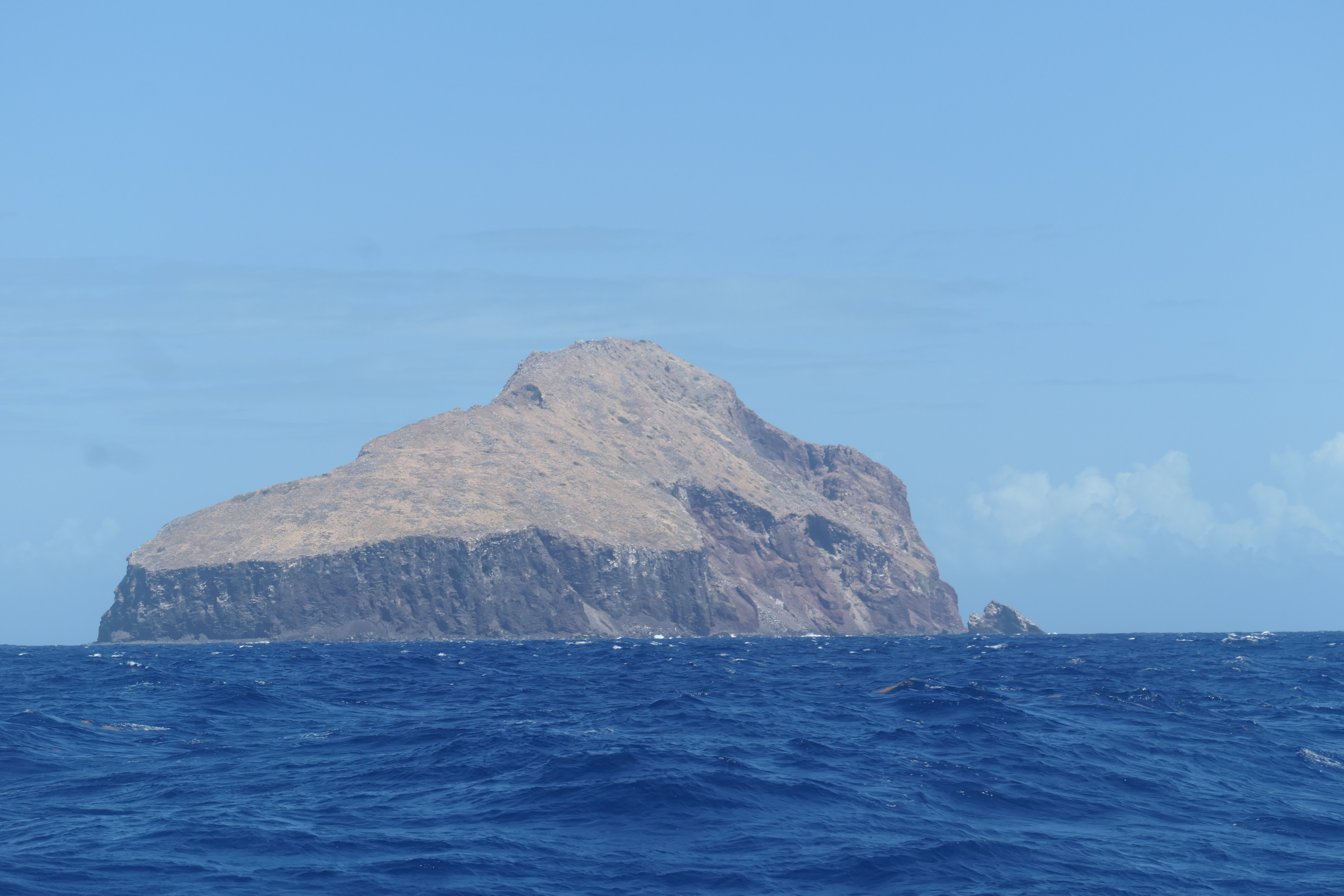
Redonda, an island in Antigua and Barbuda, where restoration efforts have taken place.

The ecological restoration of islands, or island restoration, is the application of the principles of ecological restoration to islands and island groups. Islands, due to their isolation, are home to many of the world's endemic species, as well as important breeding grounds for seabirds and some marine mammals. Their ecosystems are also very vulnerable to human disturbance, particularly to introduced species, due to their small size. Island groups, such as New Zealand and Hawaii, have undergone substantial extinctions and losses of habitat.

Since the 1950s, several organisations and government agencies around the world have worked to restore islands to their original states; New Zealand has used them to hold natural populations of species that would otherwise be unable to survive in the wild. The principal components of island restoration are the removal of introduced species and the reintroduction of native species.

== Islands, endemism and extinction ==
Isolated islands have been known to have greater levels of endemism since the 1970s when the theory of island biogeography, formulated by Robert MacArthur and E.O. Wilson, was developed. This higher occurrence of endemism is because isolation limits immigration of new species to the island, allowing new species to evolve separately from others on the mainland. For example, 71% of New Zealand's bird species (prior to human arrival) were endemic. As well as displaying greater levels of endemism, island species have characteristics that make them particularly vulnerable to human disturbance.

Many island species evolved on small islands, or even in restricted habitats on small islands. Small populations are vulnerable to even modest hunting, and restricted habitats are vulnerable to loss or modification of said habitat. More importantly, island species are often ecologically naive, that is they have not evolved alongside a predator, or have lost appropriate behavioural responses to predators. This often resulted in flightlessness, or unusual levels of tameness. This made many species susceptible to hunting (it is thought, for example, that moas were hunted to extinction in a few short generations) and to predation by introduced species. Some, such as the dodo, are thought to have become extinct because of the pressure of both humans and introduced animals. One estimate of birds in the Pacific islands puts the extinctions at 2000 species. Between 40 and 50% of the bird species of New Zealand have become extinct since 200 AD.

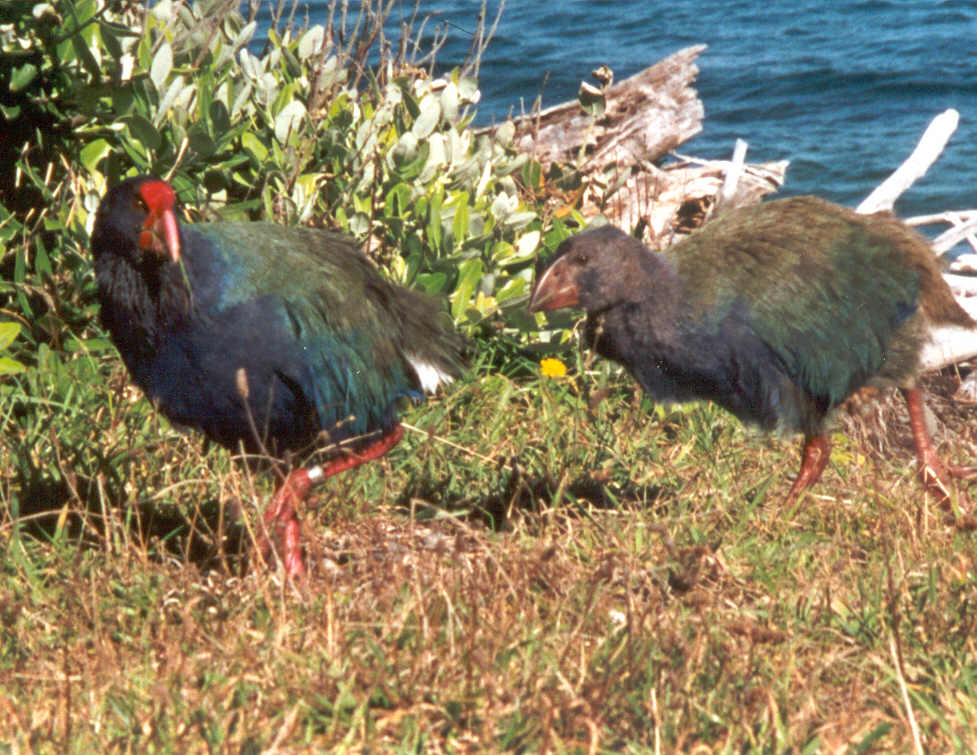
Takahē have bred after translocation to restored islands, like these on Kapiti Island.

The field of island restoration is usually credited with having been started in New Zealand in the 1960s, but other smaller projects, such as the restoration of Nonsuch Island in Bermuda (which began in 1962) have been going on for almost as long. Nevertheless, the program undertaken by the New Zealand Department of Conservation (DOC) is one of the largest in the world. It began on Cuvier Island, where ecologists removed stock, goats, feral cats and finally, in 1993, Pacific rats. The success of the project resulted in similar projects around New Zealand. The advantages to the DOC were considerable; in addition to protecting species endemic to smaller islands, like the magenta petrel, islands near the mainland, once restored, could act as habitat for species of birds that were unable to survive on the mainland. Species like the takahē, where the remaining wild population was at considerable risk from feral cats and dogs, could be moved to these islands to safeguard the species.

=== Eradication of introduced alien species ===
One important aspect of island restoration is the removal of invasive alien species. Since these species are most often the reason that native fauna and flora is threatened, their removal is essential to the restoration project. From 1673 until 2009, 786 successful invasive vertebrate eradications have been recorded and in the last few decades the frequency of eradications and the size of islands from which invasive vertebrates have been eradicated has increased. A list of the current invasive species present on the world's islands exists as the Threatened Island Database.

Islands are particularly suitable for restoration, as, once cleared of an introduced species, they can be kept clear of these species by virtue of their remoteness. Species removal is intensive and expensive, and methods used must be carefully chosen as to not create too much impact on non-target species. Feral cats, goats and three species of rats are among the most damaging species introduced to islands. The differences in size, lifestyle and behaviour preclude the use of the same techniques for all of them, but with many species a range of techniques needs to be used in order to ensure success. Larger animals, such as goats and pigs, can be effectively hunted; in the case of Round Island, in Mauritius, all the goats were eliminated by a single marksman. On larger islands ecologists use a Judas goat, where a radio collared goat is released into the wild. This goat is then followed and groups it joins are removed. To remove cats, a combination of techniques is needed: hunting, trapping and poisoning. Cats are more difficult to hunt than goats and pigs, requiring the use of experienced hunters and night hunting.

Trapping is ineffective for rats, given their sheer numbers, and the only method that works is poisoning, which can be delivered into the field by broadcasting (by hand or from the air) or by the maintenance of bait stations. This method has been employed around the world, in the Falkland Islands, in the tropical Pacific, and off New Zealand, where over 40 islands have been cleared. This method is not without problems, especially if the rats share the island with other, native species of rodent that might take the bait as well, as has happened on Anacapa Island in the Channel Islands and Rat Island (Hawadax) in the Aleutian archipelago. In the Pacific, poison intended for rats was taken by land crabs instead; the crabs were not affected by the poison but frustrated attempts to clear the rats.

The removal of invasive weeds is, in most cases, more difficult than removing animal species. One such eradication was that of sandbur, Cencrus echinatus, an introduced grass on Laysan. The grass, introduced to Laysan around 1961, had taken over 30% of the island by 1991, displaced the native bunchgrass, and reduced the breeding habitat of two endemic threatened species, the Laysan duck and Laysan finch, as well as those of several seabirds. The removal took ten years, with controlled spraying for the first year, then individual removal of plants, then, when few plants were being found, sifting of the sands around plants to remove seeds. The cost of the eradication program was $150,000 per year.

Invasive vertebrate eradication has many benefits besides conservation of species, and has been found to align with 13 UN Sustainable Development Goals and 42 associated targets, encompassing marine and terrestrial biodiversity conservation, promotion of local and global partnerships, economic development, climate change mitigation, human health and sanitation, and sustainable production and consumption.

==== Strategies ====
There are three strategies to reduce the numbers of the introduced animals in order to lighten the problems caused by them: exclusion, control, and eradication. Exclusion is removal of introduced species in limited areas and focused on a local impact.

Control has a meaning of mitigation by reducing the numbers of introduced species down to ecologically and economically less harmful level. Since it is not complete wiping out strategy, this has to be taken constantly and repeatedly. This strategy is said to be feasible but less cost effective due to its incompleteness.

Eradication is the complete removal of all the individuals of the population, down to the last potentially reproducing individual, or the reduction of their population density below sustainable levels. For islands, it is usually the best strategy as it gives permanent effects, potentially making this method the most cost effective. However, it is still logistically and economically costly, and is sometimes hard to accomplish depending on the environment of island and the alien species. The Island Conservation organization exclusively focuses on the eradication of invasive vertebrate species from islands. Up until 2021, the organization had deployed teams to protect 1,195 populations of 487 species and subspecies on 64 islands.

==== Methods ====
Fencing is used for excluding the alien mammals. This method intends to limit the area for the mammals before control or eradication.

Shooting is often used for large animals to control them. This method has meanings of gaining food supply and recreation. It requires accessibility in the field and experience for the hunters. Also, to maintain the effect, it requires good amount of manpower for long time, so it can be costly.

Trapping is designed for medium-sized mammals which are hard to shoot at. This method is usually only for reduction not eradication. The advantage of this method is that it can be selective since it is possible to exclude or reduce the possibility of trapping native animals. However, trapping requires limited area to cover and limited population to capture.

Poisoning is very effective for small species. However, there are some disadvantages of this method. It is possible that untargeted animals take the poison. It is also necessary to consider the secondary poisoning that other animals are affected by poisoned species. This method can be costly if the area to cover is large.

Pathogen Introduction (parasitism) is one of the biological methods to eradicate alien species. It is very effective for limited species, but the viruses and bacteria need to be specified clearly for use.

Predator introduction is another biological method to eradicate the introduced species. It is less costly and environmentally clean, but it can cause greater problems, because it is possible that the introduced predator targets the native animals instead of alien species and its existence and its parasites can be new problems.

Competitor introduction is also a biological method to eradicate introduced carnivores. It can be very effective with good amount of information. In the end, the competitor has to be removed as well.Virus vectored immune-contraception is one of the newest method that is to infect introduced animals with genetically engineered viruses. This method is considered environmentally clean, low cost, selective, and ethical. However, it is not fully operational and the effect comes slowly.

=== Restoration of former habitat ===
In many cases, the removal of introduced species is sufficient to allow a return to a pre-disturbance state, but active management, often through the replantation of native flora and reintroduction of extirpated fauna, is needed to achieve restoration goals. Planting of native species helps to replenish species that were either grazed or outcompeted. Species of animal can be translocated either from existing populations, or from captive bred populations. These reintroductions need to be carefully managed, particularly in the case of endangered species, where the potential benefits need to be weighed against the possibility of failure. Not all translocations succeed, and it may be necessary to help the reintroduced animals along with supplementary feeding or other kinds of management.

One other important aspect of restoration is prevention, that is, keeping invasive species from returning to a cleared island. This can be achieved by restricting access to the island in question (reducing possible instances of invasion) to more stringent quarantine methods. For example, in order to prevent invasive weeds from returning to Laysan, people working on the island must bring entirely new clothes to the island, which must be frozen prior to arrival.

== Opposition to island restoration ==
Prior to the initial efforts to remove rats from New Zealand's offshore islands, there was skepticism as to the feasibility of island restoration amongst ecologists and conservation workers. However, as the techniques have improved and larger islands have been restored, most of the initial criticisms from within the field have been dropped, in particular as the costs of eradication are often much lower than continuous pest control.

Outside of the field of conservation, there has been some opposition from other interested groups, particularly from the animal rights movement, which contends that the welfare of the pests in question is not adequately addressed in island restoration plans. Because a broad spectrum of pest removal techniques needs to be used, including leg traps, animal rights campaigners accuse ecologists of cruelty, and indifference to non-targeted species that also take bait or are trapped, and suggest that more humane methods such as capture and sterilization be used instead (something those working in island restoration contend would be too expensive, and potentially ineffective, as in the case of Kangaroo Island koalas). Some also defend the rights of the introduced species to exist as well. Others, including scientists affiliated with the animal rights movement, accept that when the choice is between the future of a species and a population of pests, the future of a species must take priority (with the caveat that the extermination is conducted as humanely as possible).

Opposition to island restoration has not led to the abandonment of many projects, but has delayed several, particularly through court action. Groups sometimes adopt different approaches; opponents of hedgehog removal in the Outer Hebrides offered bounties for live hedgehogs removed from the islands and relocated in their natural habitat. Invasive plants can also generate strong feelings. The removal of Eucalyptus trees from Angel Island in San Francisco Bay faced considerable opposition.

== Island restoration projects ==
Island restoration has been attempted in many countries since the 1960s, and has met with varying degrees of success. The following examples highlight some of the factors that influence projects. A comprehensive list of projects can be found on the Database of Island Invasive Species Eradications.

=== Round Island ===
Round Island (Île Ronde in French) is a tropical island 22.5 kilometres (14.0 mi) north of Mauritius, with an area of 1.69 square kilometres (0.65 sq mi) and a maximum elevation of 280 metres (920 ft). Compared to other Mascarene islands and islets, Round Island remained relatively pristine until goats and rabbits were introduced in the 19th century (goats were introduced between 1846 and 1868, whilst rabbits were present in large numbers before 1810). These herbivores, along with other factors, such as sporadic logging and frequent cyclones, led to the eventual dwindling of the island's forests and dependent fauna. In turn, this led to soil erosion by wind and rain, impeding forest regeneration, acting as a positive feedback mechanism that caused rapid deforestation of the island. In 1957, however, Round Island was officially made a nature reserve, and in 1979 and 1986 was rid of goats (by shooting) and rabbits (by poisoning), after several unsuccessful attempts.

Since the removal of the introduced herbivores, the Round Island plant community has recovered dramatically. This is especially stark for three of the endemic tree species, Latania loddigesii, Pandanus vandermeerschii and Hyophorbe lagenicaulis, which constituted a large portion of the Round Island forest historically. This has led to six reptile species (five of which were critically endangered) recovering in tandem with the plant community; these are the skinks Leiolopisma telfaririi and Scelotes bojerii, the geckos Phelsuma guentheri, P. ornata and Nactus serpensinsula, and the snake Casarea dussumerii.

The Round Island restoration program represents one of the longest-running projects of its kind in the world, since its conservation status was confirmed in 1957. Much of the current conservation work on Round Island is conducted by the Mauritian Wildlife Foundation and the Durrell Wildlife Conservation Trust, revolving around maintaining soil levels, the reforestation of the island, and the eradication of remaining invasive plants and invertebrates.

=== Aleutian Islands ===
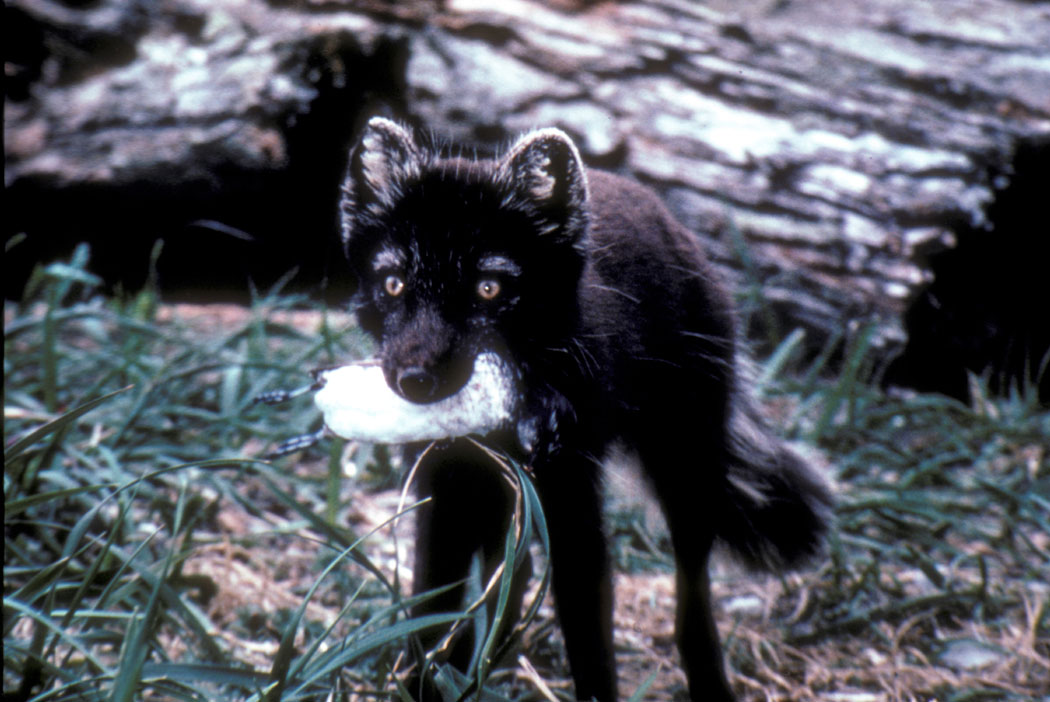
Arctic fox with a least auklet.

The Aleutian Islands, prior to the 18th century, lacked any terrestrial predators. In the mid-18th century, Arctic foxes were introduced to act as a source for the fur trade, a practice that continued into the early 20th century. This introduction decimated the birds of the chain, particularly seabirds like the whiskered auklet. The reduction in seabirds, in turn, had effects on the ecology of the islands, as many of the plants were dependent on the guano from nesting birds acting as a fertilizer. In the early 1950s, managers of the Aleutian Islands Reservation became aware of the damage, and an eradication program began.

Since then, over 80 islands have been cleared of non-native foxes (only six islands remain), and bird populations have rebounded. Whiskered auklets, which numbered 25,000 in 1974, had increased to 116,000 in 2003.

=== Campbell Island ===
Campbell Island is a sub-Antarctic island 700 km (430 mi) south of New Zealand that became infested with rats in the 19th century. Several endemic birds, including the Campbell teal and Campbell snipe, only survived on small rocky islets just off the island, and the populations were perilously low. Several teals were taken into captivity for ex-situ conservation, but once they had bred in captivity, there was nowhere else to return them to until the island was cleared of rats.

The DOC's plan to remove rats from the island was one of the most ambitious attempted, as the island was so remote, the rat populations had the highest density of rats anywhere in the world, the weather treacherous and, at 113 km^{2} (44 sq mi), it was the largest island at that point where eradication had been attempted. The poison had to be dropped in the winter, to minimize disturbance to nesting seabirds and reduce the chance of bird strike for the pilots. After several experiments, the eradication began in 2001.

In 2003, trackers with dogs were unable to find any rats. Soon after, the island was cleared it was possible to return the teals to the island. Snipe have self-reintroduced to the island and have begun breeding.

=== South Georgia ===
Rats, brought to South Georgia Island as stowaways on sealing and whaling ships in the late 18th century, have caused much damage to native wildlife, destroying tens of millions of ground-nesting birds’ eggs and chicks. While the island's glaciers previously formed a natural barrier to the spread of rats, these glaciers are now slowly melting as the climate warms. In 2011, scientists instituted a four-year program to entirely eradicate the rats and mice, in what would be by far the largest rodent eradication attempt in the world to date.

The project was led by zoologist Anthony Martin of the University of Dundee who stated, "This is a man-induced problem and it's about time that man put right earlier errors." In July 2013, the success of the main phase of the extermination of the rats, which took place in May that year, was announced. 180 tonnes of rat poison, brodifacoum, were dropped over 70% of the island, in what was the world's largest ever operation of this kind.

Another 95 t of rat poison was planned to be dropped by three helicopters in January 2015. In June 2015, the eradication programme concluded successfully, with the island believed "very likely" to be rat free. Monitoring will continue for a further two or three years.

== See also ==
- Island ecology
- Restoration ecology
