= Island Conservation =

US-based non-profit organization

- Founded: 1994
- Founders: Dr. Bernie Tershy, and Dr. Don Croll
- Type: 501(c)(3) Non-profit Organization
- Purpose: Conserving island habitats and species
- Location: Santa Cruz, California, United States
- Region served: Caribbean, North America, South America, Pacific
- Key people: Dr. Penny Becker, CEO
- Revenue: $8.7 million in 2023
- Staff: 53
- Website: www.islandconservation.org

Island Conservation is a non-profit organization with the mission to "restore islands for nature and people worldwide" and has therefore focused its efforts on islands with species categorized as Critically Endangered and Endangered on the IUCN's Red List. Working in partnership with local communities, government management agencies, and conservation organizations, Island Conservation develops plans and implements the removal of invasive alien species, and conducts field research to document the benefits of the work and to inform future projects.

Island Conservation's approach is now being shown to have a wider beneficial effect on the marine systems surrounding its project areas. In addition, invasive vertebrate eradication has now been shown to have many benefits besides conservation of species. Specifically, the approach has been found to align with 13 UN Sustainable Development Goals and 42 associated targets encompassing marine and terrestrial biodiversity conservation, promotion of local and global partnerships, economic development, climate change mitigation, human health and sanitation and sustainable production and consumption.

To date Island Conservation has deployed teams to protect 1,195 populations of 487 species and subspecies on 64 islands.

The work of Island Conservation is not without controversy, This is documented in the book Battle at the End of Eden. Restoring islands requires removing whole populations of an invasive species. There is an ethical question of whether humankind has the right to remove one species to save others. However, a 2019 study suggests that if eradications of invasive animals were conducted on just 169 islands, the survival prospects of 9.4% of the Earth's most highly threatened terrestrial insular vertebrates would be improved.

== History ==
Island Conservation was founded by Bernie Tershy and Don Croll, both Professors at UCSC's Long Marine Lab. These scientists learned about the story of Clipperton Island which had been visited by ornithologist Ken Stager of the Los Angeles County Museum in 1958. Appalled at the depredations visited by feral pigs upon the island's brown booby and masked booby colonies (reduced to 500 and 150 birds, respectively), Stager procured a shotgun and removed all 58 pigs. By 2003, the colonies numbered 25,000 brown boobies and 112,000 masked boobies, the world's second-largest brown booby colony and largest masked booby colony.

Much of organization's early focus was working in Mexico in conjunction with its sister organization, Grupo de Ecología y Conservación de Islas, in the Gulf of California and off the Pacific Coast. Subsequently, Island Conservation expanded its geographic scope to the Channel Islands of California, Pacific Coast of Canada, The Aleutians Islands, Hawaiian Islands, and finally to the Pacific, Caribbean, and South America.

Island Conservation has a strong scientific grounding. Over 160 peer-reviewed publications in major journals such as Biological Conservation, Conservation Biology and Proceedings of the National Academy of Sciences have been authored or co-authored by Island Conservation staff and contractors.

== Partnerships ==
As Island Conservation does not have management responsibility over any islands itself, all projects are in partnership with the island owner/manager, island users, local communities and regulatory authorities. Since its founding in 1994, the organization has developed partnerships with over 100 organizations. Partners include conservation organizations, government agencies, regulatory agencies, scientific institutions, and international conservation consortiums. Island Conservation is a member of the International Union for Conservation of Nature (IUCN), Alliance for Zero Extinction, and has a Memorandum of Understanding with the US Fish & Wildlife Service, and BirdLife International, amongst others.

== Advisory council ==
The organization's founding advisory board is composed of prominent scientists, practitioners, and authors in the fields of conservation biology and invasive species including Paul Ehrlich, José Sarukhán Kermez, Russell Mittermeier, Harold Mooney, David Quammen, Peter Raven, Michael Soulé, and Edward O. Wilson.

== Programs ==
=== North America ===
In this region, Island Conservation currently works in the United States and Canada. In the United States, the Anacapa Island Restoration Project was completed in 2002 and benefited the Scripps's murrelet, Cassin's auklet, and Anacapa Deer Mouse. The Lehua Island Restoration Project was completed in 2006 which benefited Newell's shearwater and black-footed albatross. Subsequently, projects completed include the Hawadax Island Restoration Project in 2008, the San Nicolas Island Project in 2010, and the Palmyra Island Restoration Project in 2011.

Key federal government partnerships in North America include in the US Department of Interior, USFWS, NPS, the US Department of Agriculture-APHIS, National Wildlife Research Center, NOAA, Parks Canada Agency, and Environment and Climate Change Canada. Island Conservation is working with the following non-governmental organizations: Coastal Conservation Association (CA), Bird Studies Canada, American Bird Conservancy, The Nature Conservancy, and Grupo de Ecología y Conservación de Islas.

=== Pacific ===
Since 2010, Island Conservation has contributed to the development and implementation of island restoration projects in Australia (Lord Howe Island and Norfolk Island), French Polynesia (Tetiꞌaroa Restoration Project in 2022, Acteon-Gambier Archipelago Restoration Project in 2015), Tonga (Late Island and numerous small islets), Republic of Palau (including within the Rock Islands Southern Lagoon World Heritage Area), Federated States of Micronesia (Ulithi Lagoon), and New Caledonia (Walpole Island). Island Conservation is an active member of the Pacific Invasives Partnership. Other key partnerships include Invasive Species Council, BirdLife International, New Zealand Department of Conservation, SPREP and the Ornithological Society of French Polynesia.

=== Caribbean ===
In this region, Island Conservation works primarily in Puerto Rico, The Commonwealth of The Bahamas, and the Dominican Republic. In May 2012, Island Conservation and the Bahamas National Trust worked together to remove invasive house mice from Allen Cay to protect native species including the Allen Cays rock iguana and Sargasso shearwater. Since 2008, Island Conservation and the US Fish and Wildlife Service (USFWS) have worked together to remove invasive vertebrates from Desecheo National Wildlife Refuge in Puerto Rico, primarily benefiting the Higo Chumbo cactus, three endemic reptiles, two endemic invertebrates, and to recover globally significant seabird colonies of brown boobies, red footed boobies, and bridled terns. Future work will focus on important seabird populations, key reptile groups including West Indian Rock Iguanas, and the restoration of Mona Island, Alto Velo, and offshore cays in the Puerto Rican Bank and The Bahamas. Key partnerships include the USFWS, Puerto Rico DNER, the Bahamas National Trust, and the Dominican Republic Ministry of Environment and Natural Resources.

=== South America ===
In this region, Island Conservation works primarily in Ecuador and Chile. In Ecuador, the Rábida Island Restoration Project was completed in 2010. A gecko (Phyllodactylus sp.) found during monitoring in late 2012 was only recorded from subfossils estimated at more than 5,700 years old. Live Rábida Island endemic land snails (Bulimulus (Naesiotus) rabidensis), not seen since collected over 100 years ago, were also collected in late 2012. This was followed in 2012 by the Pinzon and Plaza Sur Island Restoration Project primarily benefiting the Pinzón giant tortoise, Opuntia galapageia, Galápagos land iguana. As a result of the project, Pinzon Giant Tortoise hatched from eggs and were surviving in the wild for the first time in more than 150 years In 2019, The Directorate of Galápagos National Park with Island Conservation used drones to eradicate invasive rats from North Seymour Island—this was the first time such an approach has been used on vertebrates in the wild. The expectation is that this innovation will pave the way for cheaper invasive species eradications in the future on small and mid-sized islands. The current focus in Ecuador is Floreana Island with 55 IUCN threatened species present and 13 extirpated species that could be reintroduced after invasive mammals are eradicated. Partners include: The Leona M. and Harry B. Helmsley Charitable Trust, Ministry of Environment (Galápagos National Park Directorate, Galápagos Biosecurity Agency), the Ministry of Agriculture, the Floreana Parish Council and the Galapagos Government Council.

In 2009 Chile, Island Conservation initiated formal collaborations with CONAF, the country's protected areas agency, to further restoration of islands under their administration. In January 2014, the Choros Island Restoration Project was completed benefiting the Humboldt penguin, Peruvian diving petrel, and the local eco-tourism industry. The focus of future work includes the Humboldt Penguin National Reserve and the Juan Fernández Archipelago, where technology developed by Wildlife Drones is being used to support conservation efforts. This includes tracking endangered species and collecting ecological data across challenging terrains.

=== Conservation innovation ===
From its earliest days, Island Conservation has prided itself on innovating its tools and approach to eradication projects. Island Conservation implemented its first helicopter-based aerial broadcast eradication on Anacapa Island in 2001 refining technology developed in New Zealand for agriculture and pest control, this has been replicated on more than 10 international island restoration projects since. Island Conservation has developed practices for holding native species in captivity for re-release and mitigating risks to species, including the successful capture and release of endemic mice on Anacapa and hawks on Pinzon.

In 2010, Island Conservation partnered with the U.S. Humane Society to remove feral cats from San Nicolas Island for relocation to a sanctuary on the mainland California. New tools including a remote trap monitoring system, digital data collection system, and statistical decision support tools improved the humanness of removal methods, reduced project cost, and reduced time to declare success.

Following a series of failed eradication attempts in 2012, Island Conservation led a group of international experts to identify challenges on tropical islands resulting in recommend practices for tropical rodent eradications. Applying these lessons following a failed attempt on Desecheo island 2017 resulted in success.

Island Conservation led a horizon scan in 2015 that identified drones, genetic biocontrol, and conflict transformation as critical innovations to increase the scale, scope, and pace of rodent eradications. Since this exercise, Island Conservation formed the Genetic Biocontrol for Invasive Rodents (GBIRd) partnership to cautiously explore the development of safe and ethical genetic technologies to prevent extinctions, supported sustainable community-driven approaches to conservation projects, and implemented the world's first drone-powered rat eradication. The current focus of the Conservation Innovation program is to advance methods that increase safety, reduce cost, and improve the feasibility of eradicating invasive vertebrates from islands.
