= Hawadax Island =

Group of islands in Alaska, United States

Coordinates: 51°48′09″N 178°17′51″E

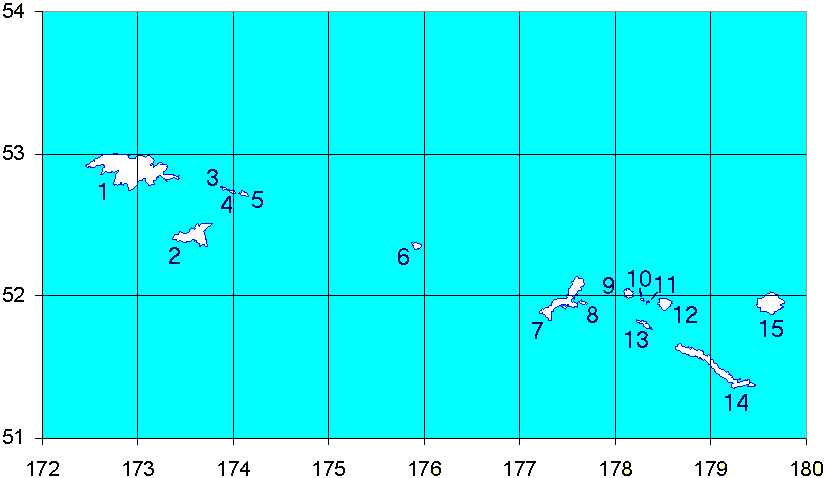
Hawadax Island (no 13).

Hawadax Island (Aleut: Hawadax;) is an island in the Rat Islands archipelago of the western Aleutian Islands in the U.S. state of Alaska. The island was formerly known as Rat Island until May 2012 when it was renamed Hawadax Island, which is an Aleut name meaning "entry" and "welcome". The island has a land area of 10.72 square miles (27.8 km^{2}) and no permanent population. It is within the Alaska Maritime National Wildlife Refuge.

The former name is the English translation of the name given to the islands by Captain Fyodor Petrovich Litke in 1827 when he visited the Aleutian Islands on a voyage around the world.

The Rat Islands are very earthquake-prone as they are on the boundary of the Pacific and North American tectonic plates. In 1965, there was a major earthquake with the magnitude 8.7 in the Rat Islands.

== History ==
Hawadax Island has been traditionally inhabited and frequented by the Unangan or Aleut people since pre-history, although the island is uninhabited today. Archaeological records indicate that puffins and other burrow-nesting seabirds were likely common on the island before the introduction of rats in the 1700s (See below). The island became known in Russian as Krysi, probably from the Aleut name Ayugadak, meaning "rat". The U.S. Board on Geographic Names officially made Rat Island the island's name in 1937.

The name was eventually changed in 2012, when the Board approved a proposal by Karen Pletnikoff of the Aleutian Pribilof Islands Association to rename Rat Island as Hawadax Island, an Aleut name recorded in historical sources. The name is Aleut for "entry" or "welcome".

== Conservation and restoration ==
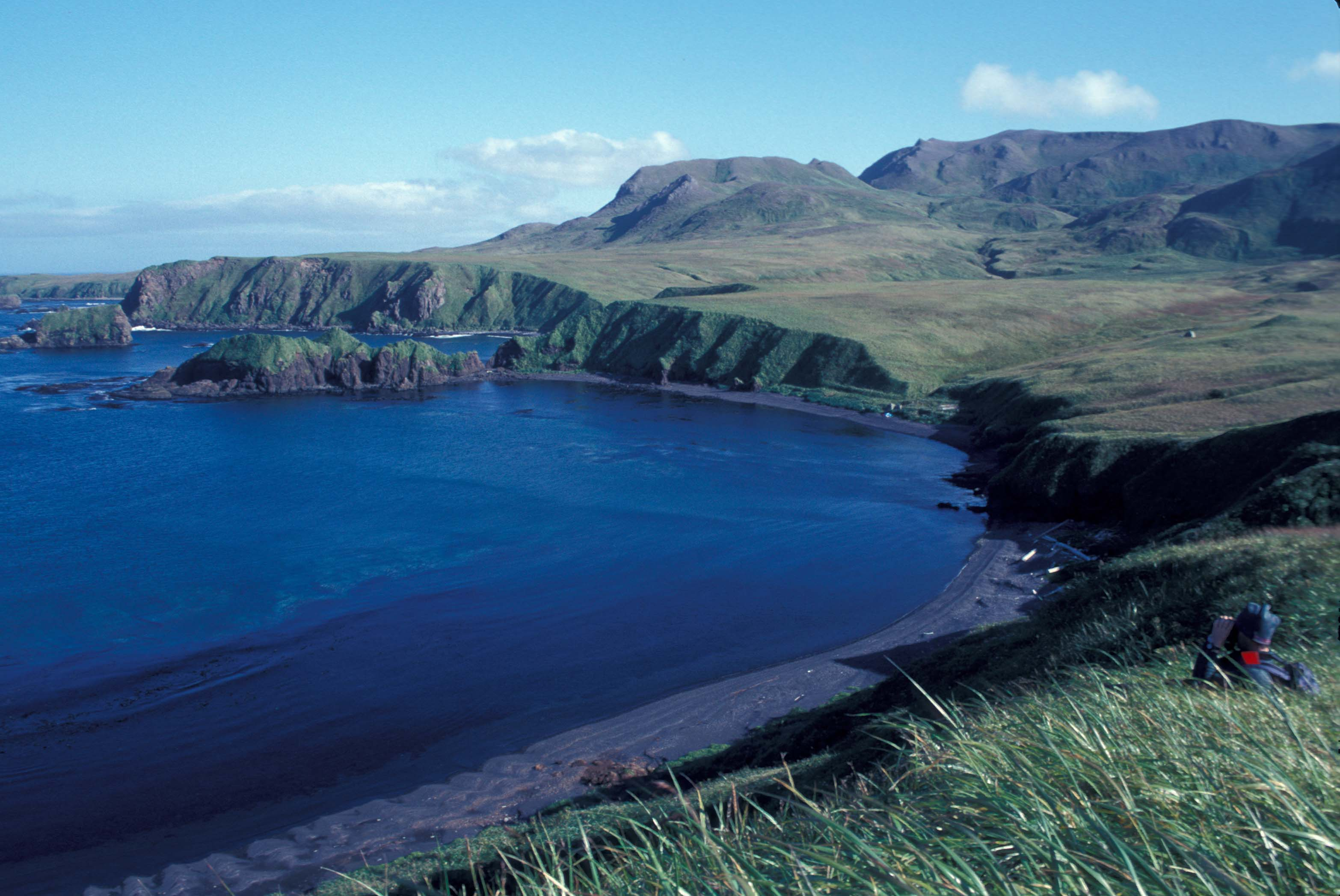
Hawadax Island

The island was heavily infested with brown rats (Rattus norvegicus), which are considered a nuisance invasive species due to their negative impact on the population of ground-nesting wild birds.

The rats arrived on the island before 1780 due to a Japanese shipwreck. Since then, the rats had a devastating effect on local seabirds that have no natural defenses against the rats. Invasive rats are also present on 16 other islands in the Aleutian chain.

In 2007, the U.S. Fish and Wildlife Service (FWS), which manages the refuge, was formulating plans to eradicate the rats. The eradication plan is modelled on a successful one to eliminate the Arctic fox from various Aleutian islands, where they were deliberately introduced for breeding. In September 2008, the U.S. Fish and Wildlife Service (FWS), in partnership with Island Conservation and The Nature Conservancy eradicated Norway rats with the first aerial application of bait in the State of Alaska. Some nontarget mortality was expected, but the actual quantity exceeded what was predicted. The Ornithological Council reported that more than 420 birds were killed as a result of the rat eradication program. Forty-six bald eagles died (exceeding the known population of 22 bald eagles on the island); toxicological analysis revealed lethal levels of brodifacoum in 12 of the 16 carcasses tested. Of the 320 glaucous-winged gull carcasses collected, toxicology tests implicated brodifacoum in 24 of the 34 tested. Fifty-four carcasses of another 25 bird species were found. With the exception of bald eagles, most bird populations surveyed increased in abundance so the impacts on non-target species are likely to be temporary.

In June 2009, the island was declared rat-free for the first time in 229 years, although the site was continually monitored for another two years for confirmation. The report found that the lead contractor which the FWS used, Island Conservation, had dropped more poisonous bait than they had proposed, including bait which was intended to be saved as a backup. The FWS asked the Ornithological Council to determine if Island Conservation had exceeded the limit of their poison quantities, but the council decided not to resolve any "legal questions". As of 2011, the State of Alaska issued a Notice of Violation and FWS law enforcement is still investigating. Steve Delehanty, the manager of the Alaska Maritime National Wildlife Refuge (which includes the island) said that, "It was a learning experience, and we made mistakes together." However, he also stated, "...if you do the math this was a rip-roaring conservation success." Post eradication monitoring results have shown a strong positive response in terms of bird populations and the intertidal zone.

== See also ==
- Campbell Island, New Zealand, the largest successful rat eradication.
