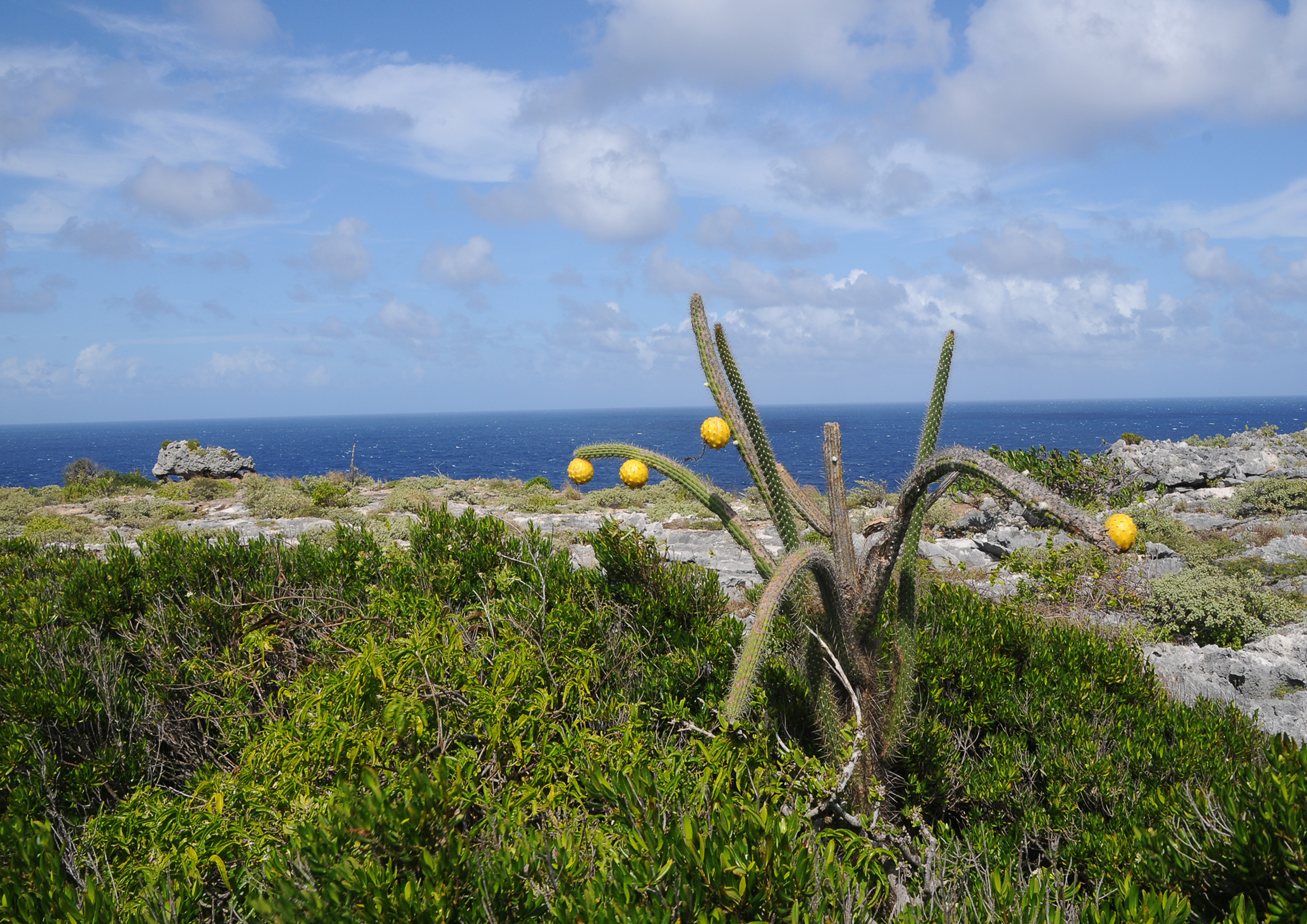

Conservation status
- Critically Imperiled (NatureServe)

- Threatened (ESA)

Scientific classification
- Kingdom: Plantae
- Clade: Tracheophytes
- Clade: Angiosperms
- Clade: Eudicots
- Order: Caryophyllales
- Family: Cactaceae
- Subfamily: Cactoideae
- Genus: Harrisia
- Species: H. portoricensis

Binomial name
- Harrisia portoricensis Britt.

Synonyms
- Cereus portoricensis (Britton) Urb. 1910; Harrisia hurstii W.T.Marshall 1941

= Harrisia portoricensis =

Species of plant

Harrisia portoricensis is a species of cactus in the genus Harrisia. Its common names include higo chumbo and Puerto Rico applecactus.

== Description ==
Harrisia portoricensis grows upright with only a few branches and reaches heights of 2 to 3 meters. The slender shoots have a diameter of 3 to 4 centimeters. There are eleven rounded ribs, separated from each other by shallow furrows. The 13 to 17 grayish white thorns have a darker tip and are 2 to 3 centimeters long.

The flowers are up to 15 centimeters long. The yellow, spherical to egg-shaped fruits reach a diameter of 4 to 6 centimeters.

== Distribution ==
It is endemic to Puerto Rico, where it is known from three smaller islands off the coast of the main island. The population is estimated at 59,000 on Mona Island, 148 individuals on Monito Island, and only 9 on Desecheo Island. It grows on in scrubland on exposed limestone at elevations of 0–150 meters.

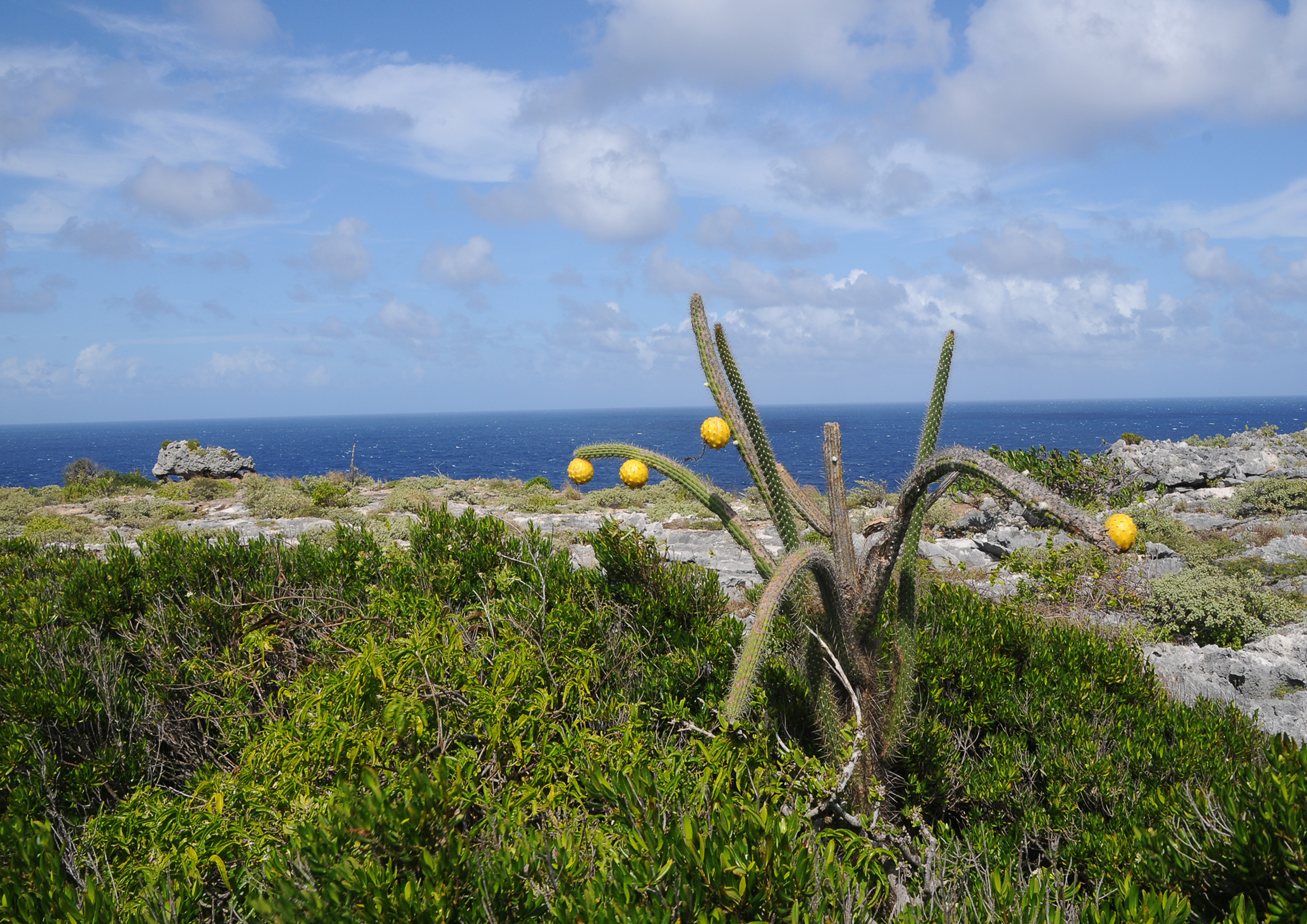
Scene of higo chumbo cactus with water in background

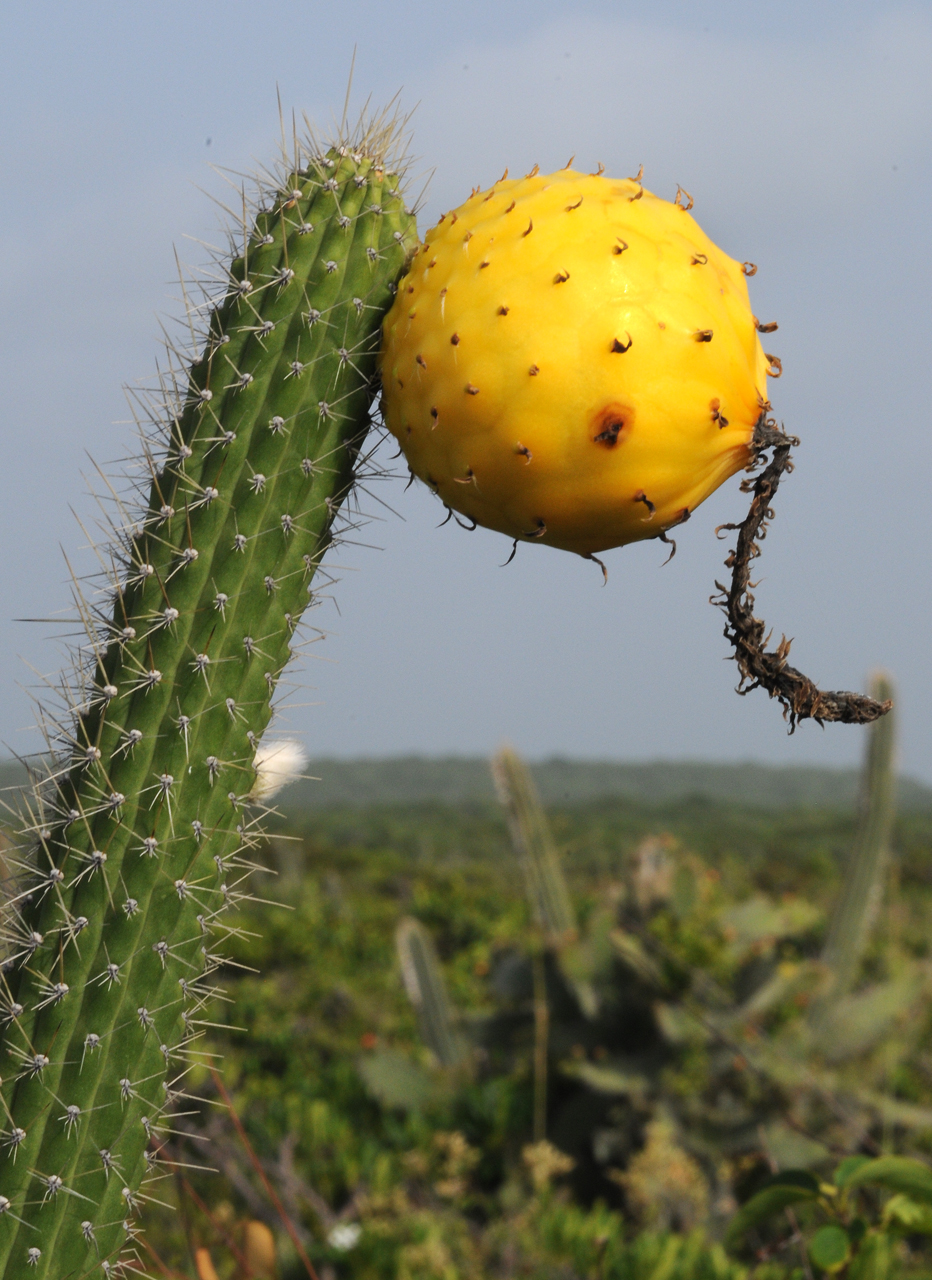
Higo chumbo on Mona Island

== Taxonomy ==
The first description by Nathaniel Lord Britton was published in 1908. The specific epithet portoricensis refers to the occurrence of the species in Puerto Rico. A nomenclature synonym is Cereus portoricensis (Britton) Urb. (1910).

== Conservation ==
Higo chumbo was added to the list of federally threatened species protected under the U.S. Endangered Species Act effective on September 7, 1990. The species was originally described from specimens collected in the Las Cucharas region near Ponce, but this population has been extirpated. Development contributed to the elimination of higo chumbo from the main island and is a potential threat to the population on Mona Island. Other threats include the browsing activity of feral goats on Mona Island and Desecheo Island, as well as from feral pigs on Mona Island. Plant disease and the activity of Cactoblastis cactorum may have contributed to historic population declines according to the Puerto Rico Department of Natural Resources.
