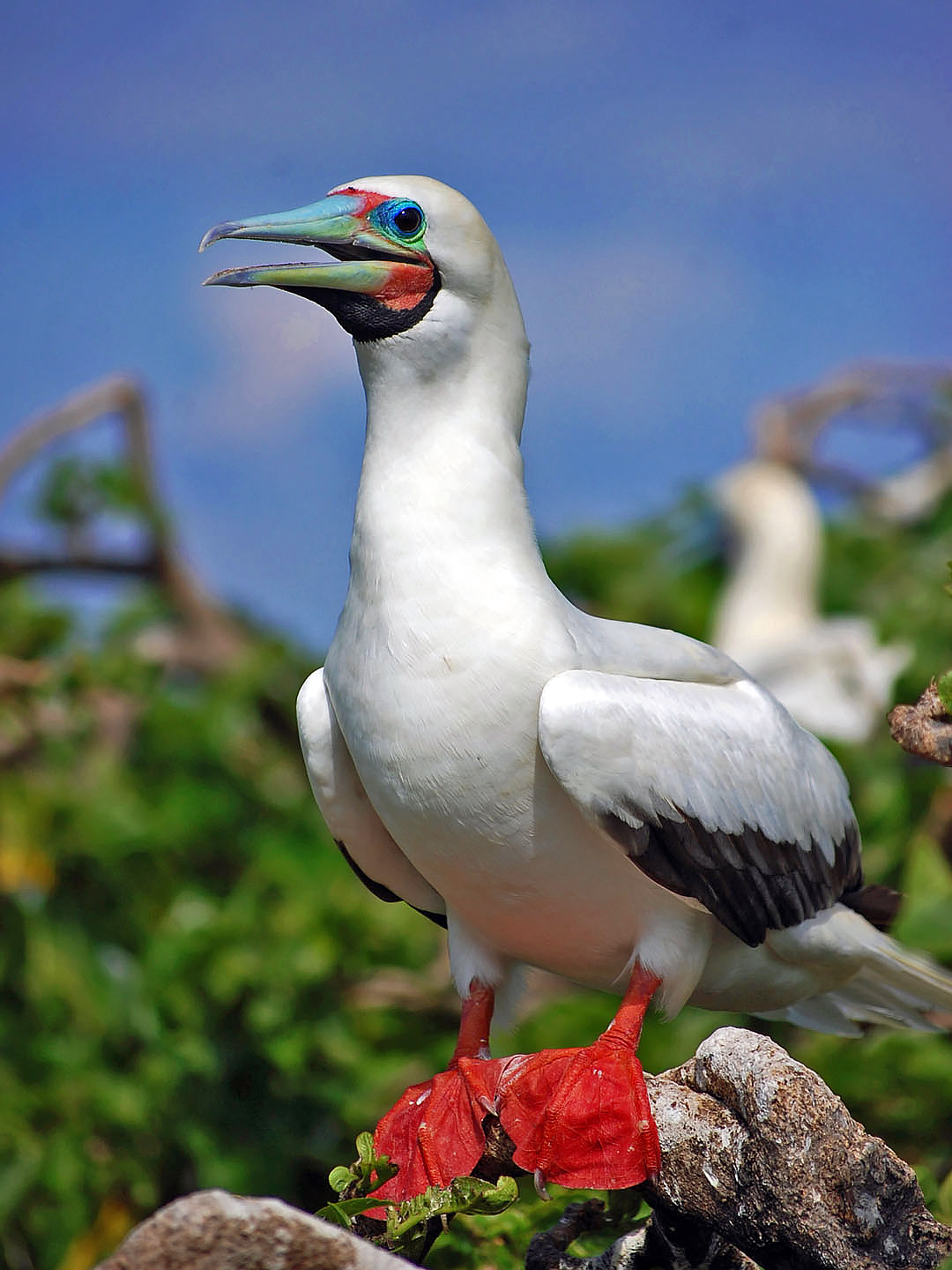
- White morph, Philippines
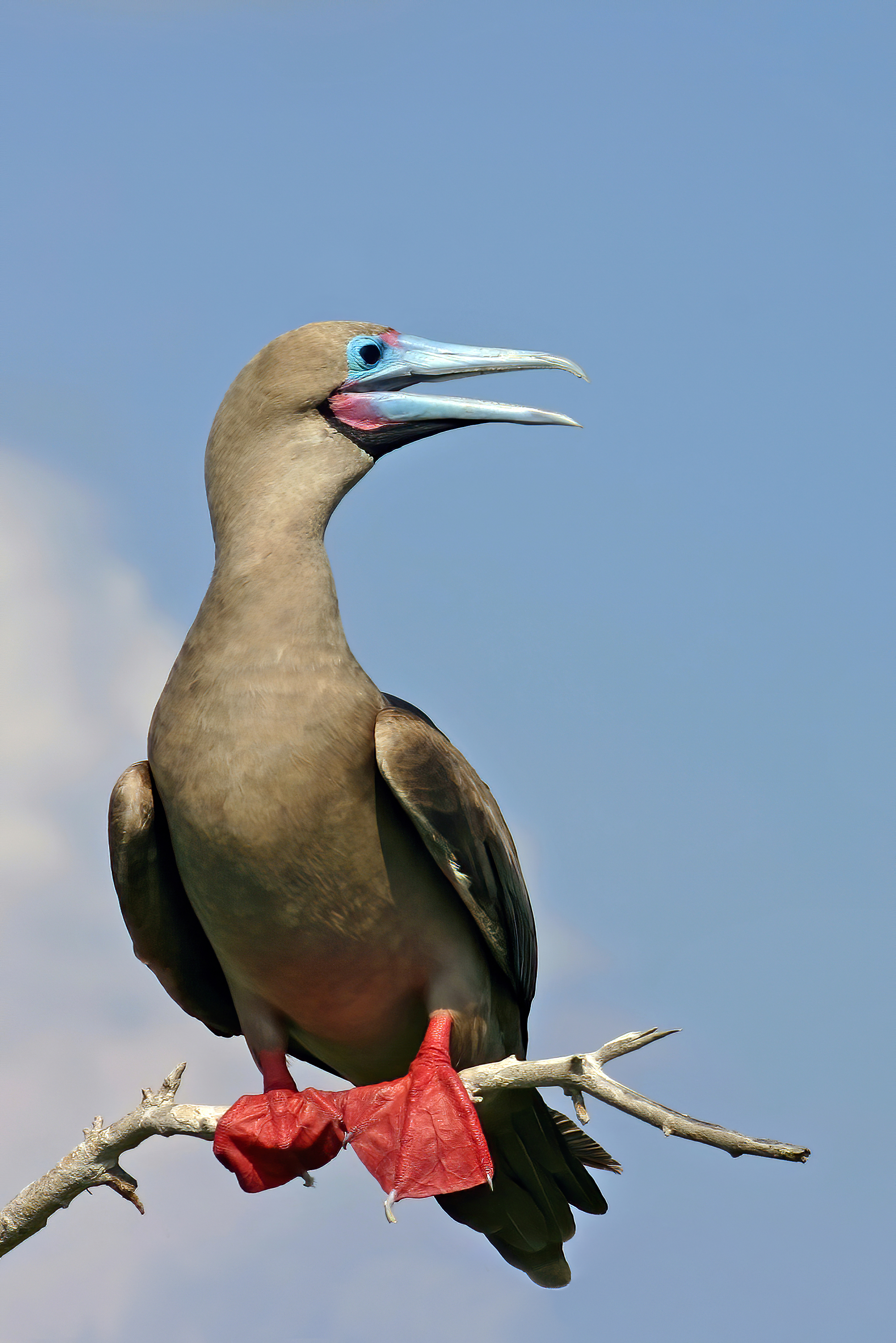
- Brown morph, male, Galápagos Islands

Conservation status
- Least Concern (IUCN 3.1)

Scientific classification
- Kingdom: Animalia
- Phylum: Chordata
- Class: Aves
- Order: Suliformes
- Family: Sulidae
- Genus: Sula
- Species: S. sula

Binomial name
- Sula sula (Linnaeus, 1766)

Synonyms
- Pelecanus sula Linnaeus, 1766; Pelecanus piscator Linnaeus, 1758; Sula piscator (Linnaeus, 1758)

= Red-footed booby =

Red-footed booby Temporal range: Holocene – recent

Species of bird

The red-footed booby (Sula sula) is a large seabird of the booby family, Sulidae. Adults always have red feet, but the colour of the plumage varies. They are powerful and agile fliers, harnessing the wind to fly efficiently, but they are clumsy in takeoffs and landings. They forage by catching flying fish from above the ocean's surface and by performing shallow dives. They are found widely in the tropics, and breed colonially in coastal regions, especially isolated islands such as St. Brandon, Mauritius (Cargados Carajos shoals), and the Chagos Archipelago. Although its population is declining, it is considered to be a least-concern species by the International Union for Conservation of Nature (IUCN). It faces threats from climate change, competition with fisheries, human disturbance, and invasive species.

== Taxonomy ==
The red-footed booby was formally described by the Swedish naturalist Carl Linnaeus in 1766, in the twelfth edition of his Systema Naturae. He gave it the binomial name Pelecanus sula and described it based on a specimen from Barbados. The present genus Sula was introduced by the French scientist Mathurin Jacques Brisson in 1760. The word Sula is Norwegian for a gannet.

There are three subspecies:

- S. s. sula (Linnaeus, 1766) – Caribbean and southwest Atlantic islands
- S. s. rubripes Gould, 1838 – tropical Pacific and Indian Oceans
- S. s. websteri Rothschild, 1898 – eastern central Pacific

== Description ==
The red-footed booby is the smallest member of the booby and gannet family at about 70 cm (28 in) in length and with a wingspan of up to 152 cm (60 in). The average weight of 490 adults from Christmas Island was 837 g (1.845 lb). It has red legs, and its bill and throat pouch are coloured pink and blue. This species has several morphs. In the white morph the plumage is mostly white (the head often tinged yellowish) and the flight feathers are black. The black-tailed white morph is similar, but with a black tail, and can easily be confused with the Nazca and masked boobies. The brown morph is overall brown. The white-tailed brown morph is similar, but has a white belly, rump, and tail. The white-headed and white-tailed brown morph has a mostly white body, tail and head, and brown wings and back. The morphs commonly breed together, but in most regions one or two morphs predominates; for example, at the Galápagos Islands, most belong to the brown morph, though the white morph also occurs.

The sexes are similar, and juveniles are brownish with darker wings, and pale pinkish legs, while chicks are covered in dense white down.

== Distribution ==
The red-footed booby is widespread throughout the tropics of the Atlantic, Pacific, and Indian Oceans. In the Atlantic, they mainly live in the Caribbean islands. In the Pacific, populations can be found in the Galapagos Islands, mostly on Genovesa and San Cristobal and in Hawaii, on Kauai. In the Indian Ocean, it is found on Aldabra, the Seychelles, Rodrigues, the Maldives, the Chagos Archipelago, the Cocos (Keeling) Islands, and Christmas Island.

The red-footed booby has been extirpated from a large number of islands due to a combination of introduced predators and human predation, including the Glorioso Islands, Assumption Island, Tikopia, Henderson Island, the Marquesas Islands, the Society Islands, and Desecheo Island. The species is a vagrant to Sri Lanka, New Zealand, and the United Kingdom. Records of vagrant red-footed boobies have also increased in frequency in the United States and Canada in recent years.

== Ecology and behaviour ==
=== Breeding ===
This species breeds on islands in most tropical oceans. When not breeding it spends most of the time at sea. In the Chagos Archipelago, it remains close to its breeding colony throughout the year, rather than migrating. It nests in large colonies, laying one chalky blue egg in a stick nest, which is incubated by both adults for 44–46 days. The nest is usually placed in a tree or bush, but rarely it may nest on the ground. It may be three months before the young first fly, and five months before they make extensive flights.

Red-footed booby pairs may remain together over several seasons. They perform elaborate greeting rituals, including harsh squawks and the male's display of his blue throat, also including short dances.

=== Diet ===
The diet of red-footed boobies consists mostly of fish (such as Exocoetidae flying fish and Gempylidae escolars) and squid. Studies of the red-footed booby on Christmas Island have found that most fish eaten are 6–15 cm (2.4–5.9 in) long, with a maximum length of 20 cm (7.9 in), and most squid are 6–10 cm (2.4–3.9 in), with a maximum length of 15 cm (5.9 in). On Aldabra, the proportion of fish and squid in the diet varies between seasons; squid make up 21% of the diet by mass in the wet season and 1% in the dry season. They generally catch prey by diving into the ocean vertically from heights of 4 to 8 m (13 to 26 ft), although flying fish may be caught while in the air, as evidenced via bird-borne video footage. Red-footed boobies travel hundreds of kilometers from land when they are foraging for prey, and sometimes engage in multi-day trips.

=== Predators and parasites ===
Adult red-footed boobies are known to be hunted by coconut crabs; the crabs use their powerful claws to break the wings of boobies or catch them by their legs. One booby attacked while asleep on a low branch was killed by six coconut crabs over a period of several hours, while another caught after landing near the entrance to a crab burrow was dragged inside. Red-footed booby nestlings and eggs are also attacked by a variety of predators, including rats, cats, pigs, raptors, and Micronesian starlings, although introduced mammalian predators have a limited impact as the booby nests in trees. However, the booby's habit of breeding on remote islands may be an adaptation to avoid predation; on the Galápagos Islands, the red-footed booby does not nest on any islands inhabited by the Galapagos hawk, even when they have suitable conditions, and has been observed colonizing islands soon after the hawk is extirpated on them. Humans eat both red-footed booby adults and nestlings; boobies will bite humans trying to catch them near their nest.

Parasites recorded from the species include the tick Ornithodoros capensis in nests and the bird louse Pectino pygus in adults.

== Conservation ==
The International Union for Conservation of Nature (IUCN) lists the red-footed booby as a species of least concern, though the population worldwide is decreasing. The warm phase (El Niño) of the El Niño–Southern Oscillation in 1982 and 1983 negatively affected breeding on Christmas Island as higher water temperatures reduced food supply. Where usually 6000 pairs nested, 30 pairs and around 60 pairs attempted breeding in 1982 and 1983 respectively.

== Gallery ==
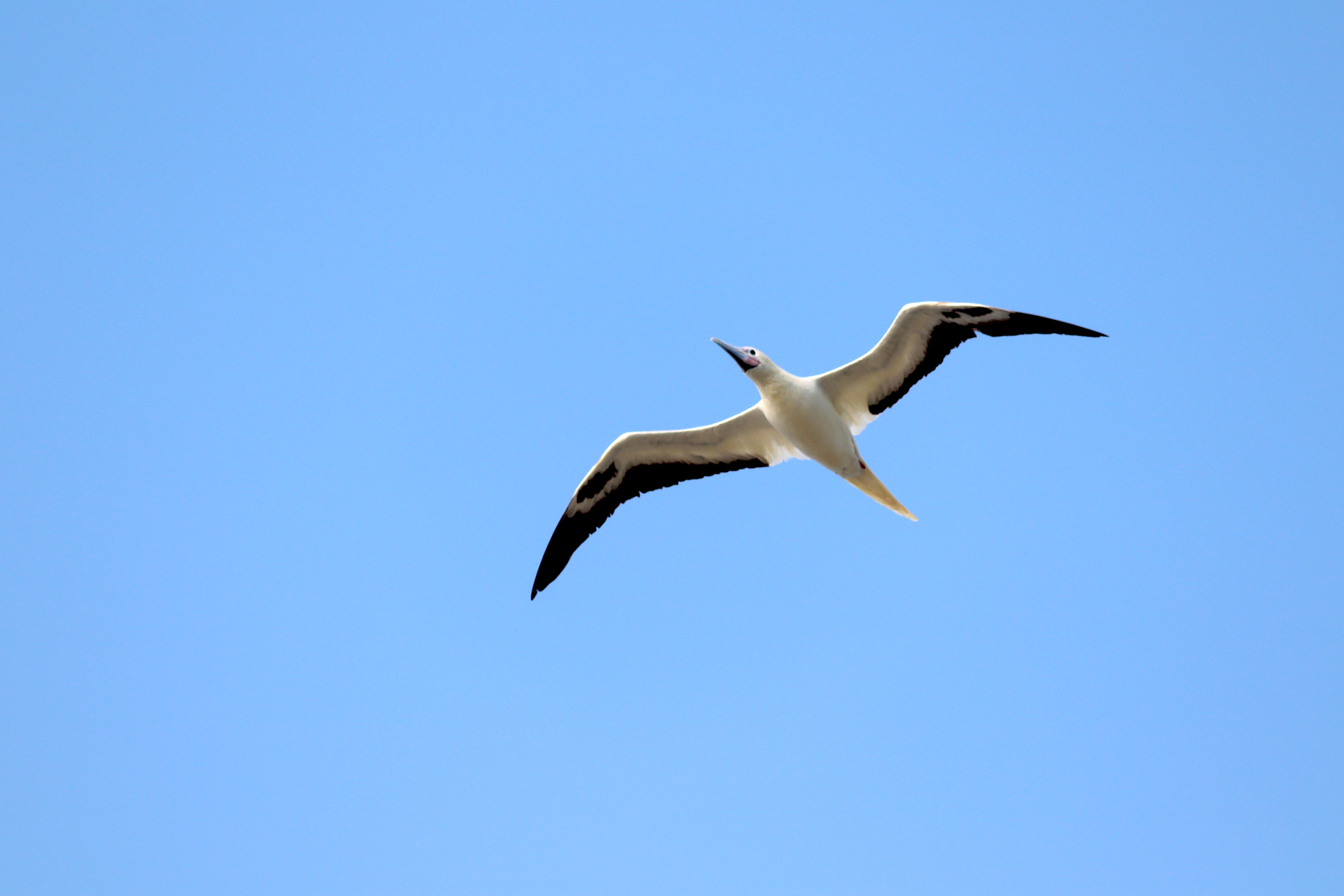
Red footed booby in flight over Half Moon Caye, Belize

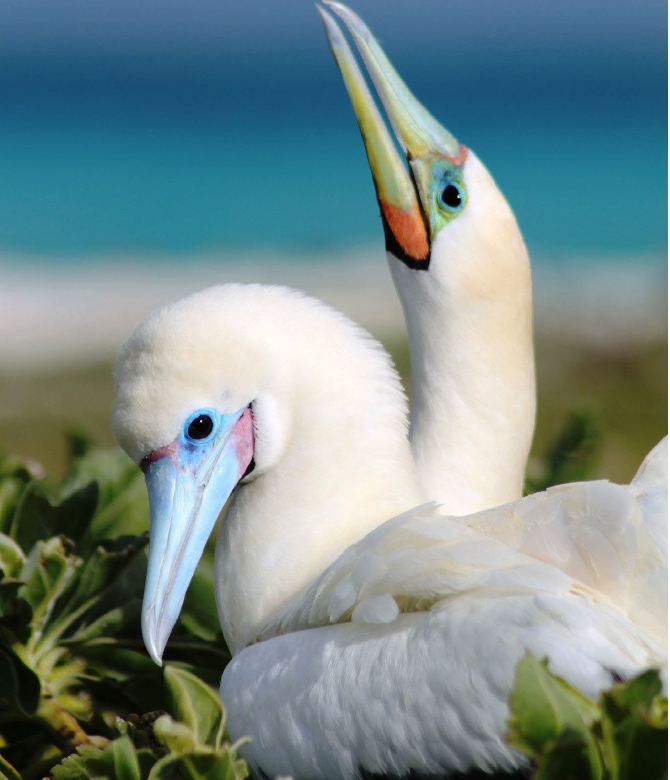
Nesting pair in the Papahānaumokuākea Marine National Monument

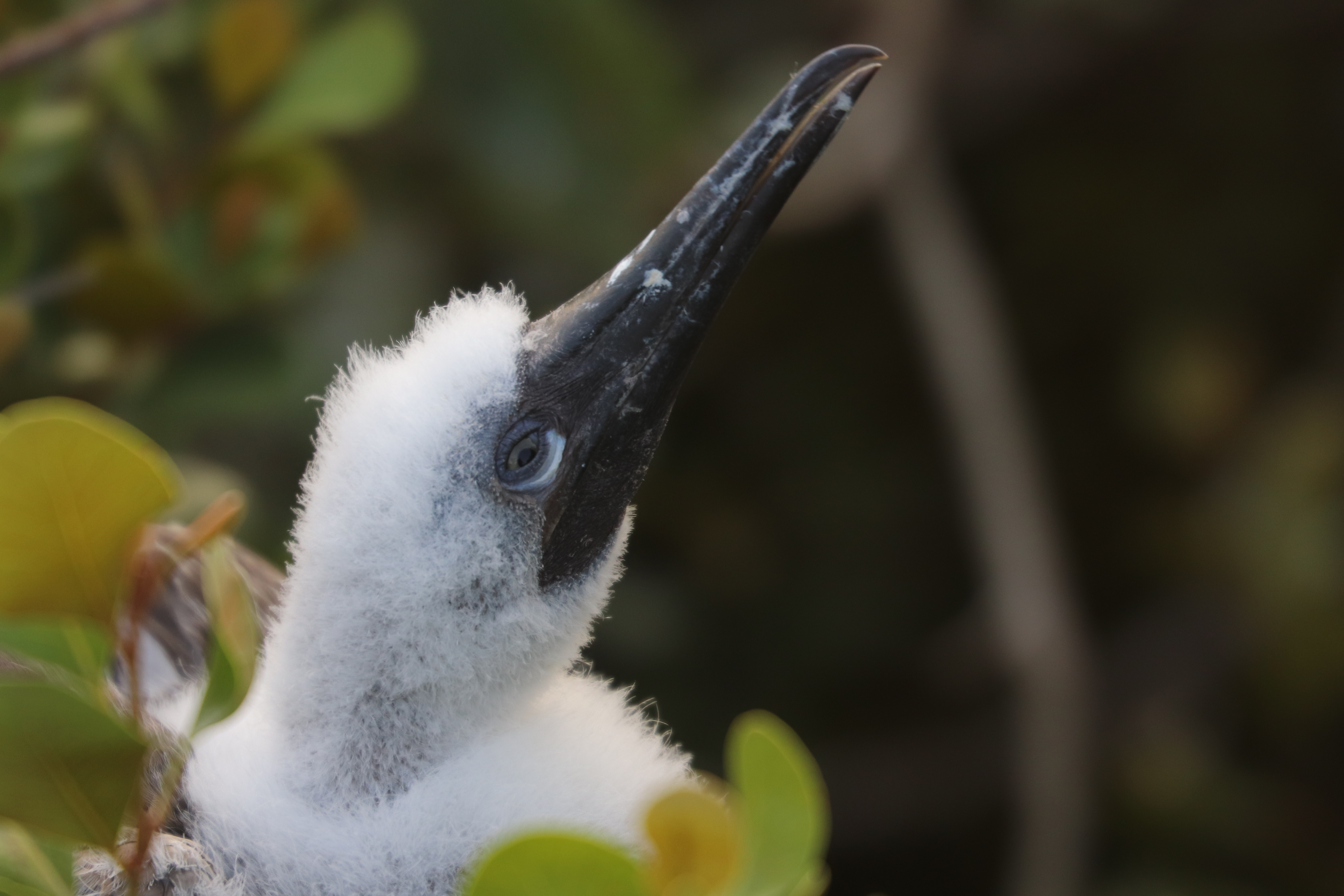
Juvenile red-footed booby poking his head out of his nest on Half Moon Caye, Belize

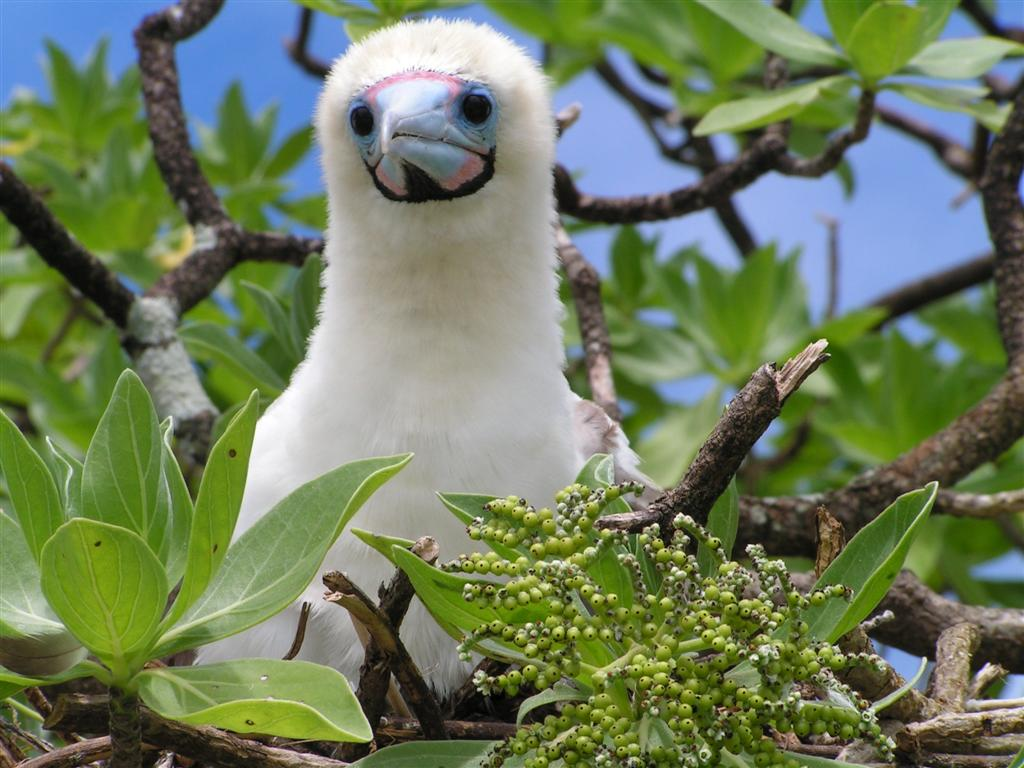
Red-footed booby

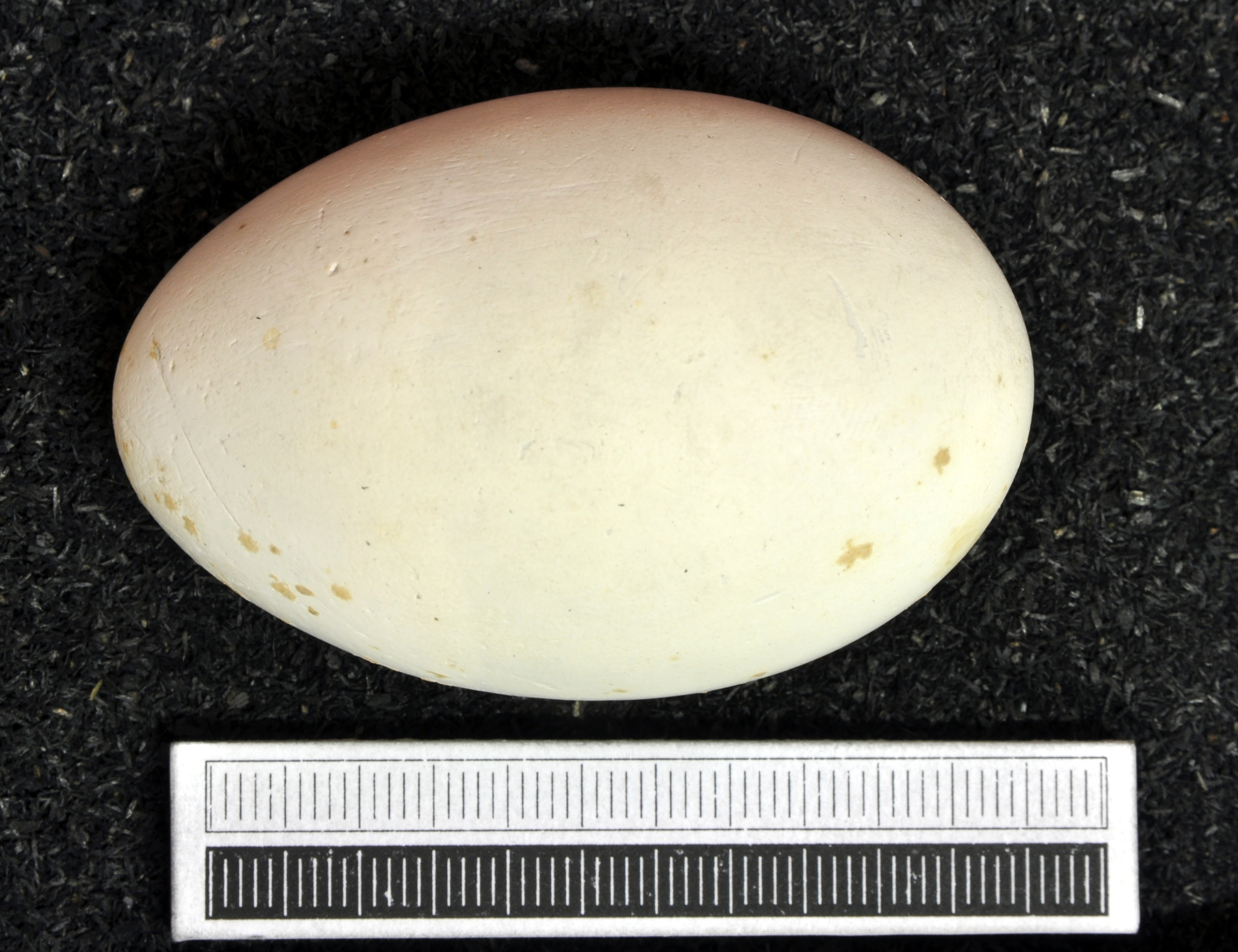
Egg, Collection Museum Wiesbaden
