= 2020 Caribbean earthquake =

Earthquake between Jamaica and Cuba

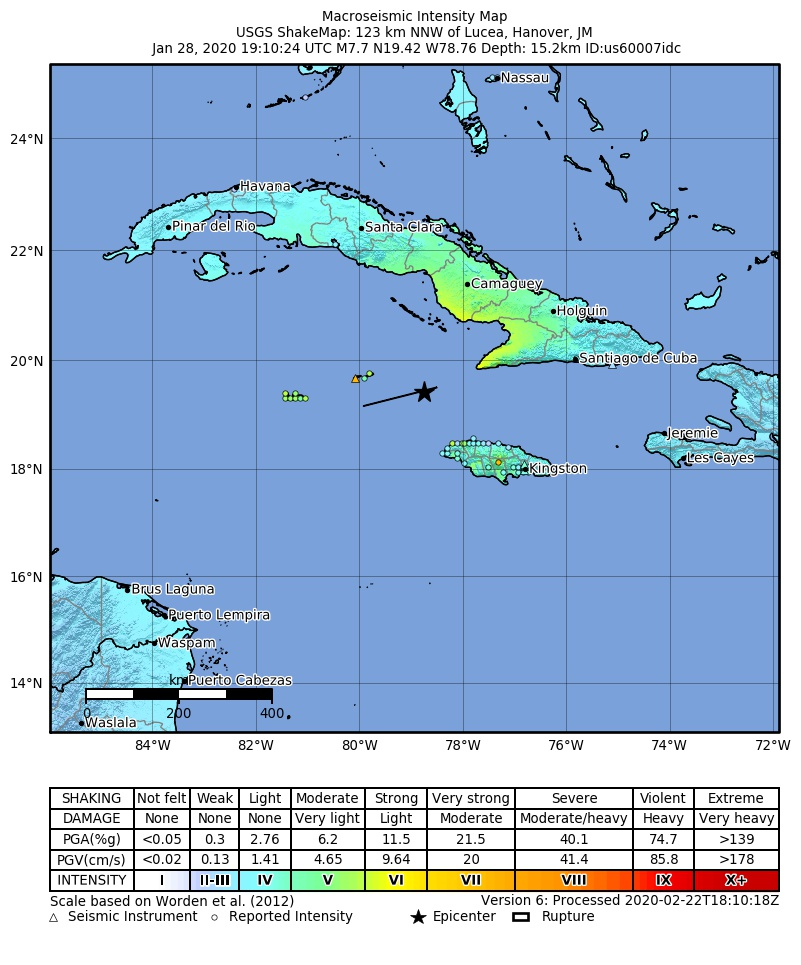
- Shakemap from USGS

- Location within the Caribbean
- UTC time: 2020-01-28 19:10:24
- ISC event: 617210084
- USGS-ANSS: ComCat
- Local date: 28 January 2020
- Local time: 14:10:25
- Magnitude: 7.7 M_{w}
- Depth: 14.9 km (9 mi)
- Epicenter: 19.419°N 78.756°W
- Fault: Septentrional-Oriente fault zone
- Type: Strike-slip
- Areas affected: Cayman Islands; Jamaica; Cuba
- Max. intensity: MMI VI (Strong)
- Tsunami: 0.46 m (1.5 ft) at George Town, Cayman Islands
- Aftershocks: Up to 6.1 M_{w}
- Casualties: None

At 02:10 PM local time (UTC-5) on 28 January 2020, an earthquake with a magnitude of 7.7 M_{w} struck the north side of the Cayman Trough, north of Jamaica and west of the southern tip of Cuba, with the epicenter being 80 miles (130 km) east-southeast of Cayman Brac, Cayman Islands, and 83 miles (134 km) north of Montego Bay, Jamaica. Schools in Jamaica, as well as corporate and public buildings in Miami, were evacuated after shaking was experienced in parts of the U.S. state of Florida, a region not typically thought of in-relation to seismic activity. Light shaking was also reported on the Yucatán Peninsula in Mexico. The quake was the largest seismic event in the Caribbean since 1946. A tsunami warning for the Caribbean Sea was initially issued by the Pacific Tsunami Warning Center, later being withdrawn.

== Tectonic setting ==
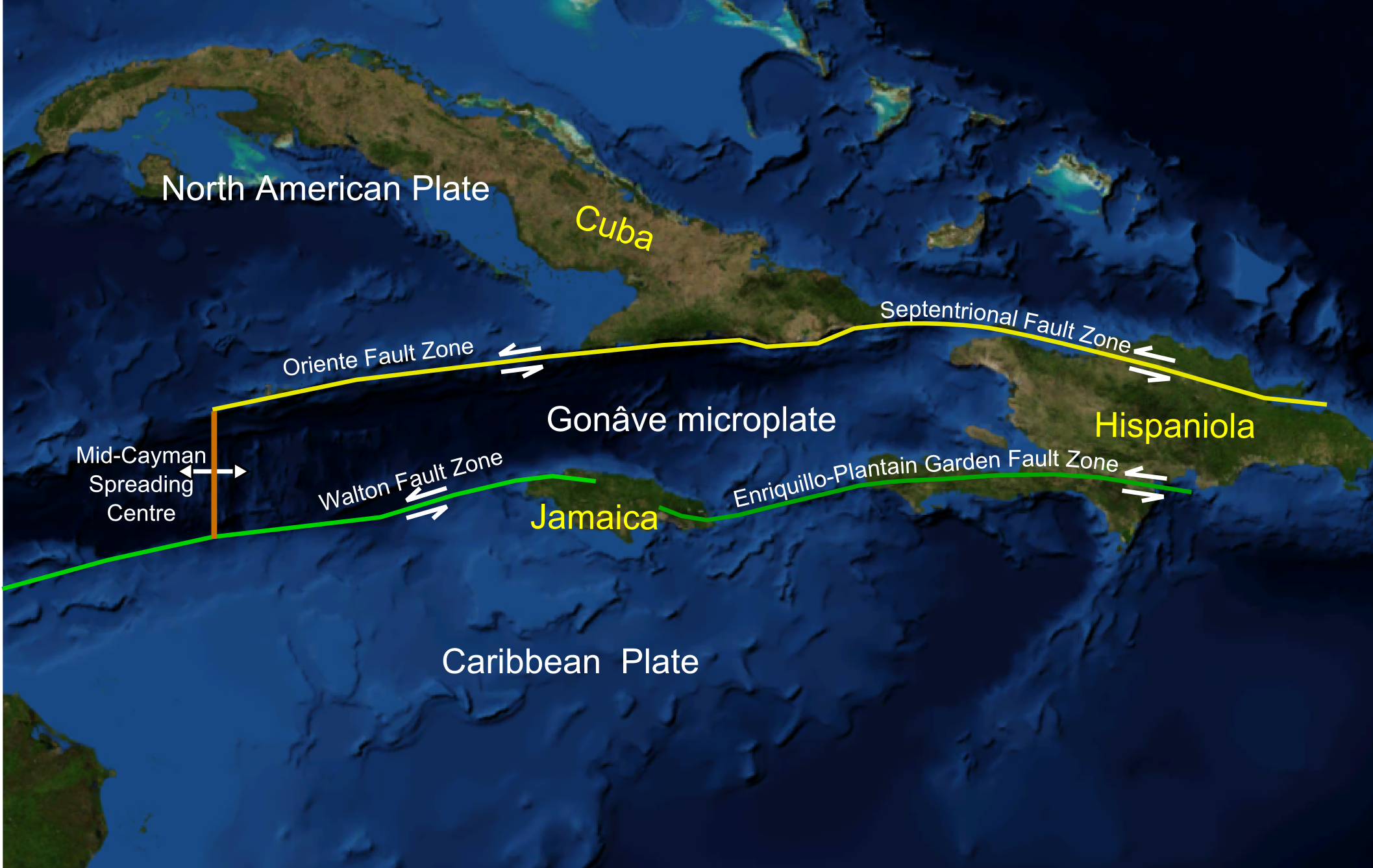
Gonâve microplate map

The 28 January 2020 earthquake occurred near the boundary of the Gonâve microplate, a small strip of Oceanic crust between the North American and Caribbean plate. It is bounded to both north and south by large transform faults that together accommodate the relative displacement of the two major plates. The Septentrional–Oriente fault zone runs north, mainly left-lateral strike-slip motion at approximately 10 mm/yr. Major left-lateral strike-slip faults, the Walton fault zone and the Enriquillo–Plantain Garden fault zone, are major left-lateral strike-slip faults with a slip of approximately 9 mm/yr. These faults are interrupted in Jamaica by the Jamaica restraining bend.

Large magnitude earthquakes in the Caribbean are primarily located along the boundaries of the Gonâve microplate, a region with high seismicity due to plate interactions. United States Geological Survey's historical earthquake database shows 25 earthquakes with ≥ M_{w}6.0 since the 1900s, including two other earthquakes with ≥ M_{w}7.0, such as the Haiti earthquake in 2010 and the Honduras earthquake in 2018. The M_{w}7.7 Caribbean earthquake was the most powerful event in this region, with the mainshock occurring in a seismic gap along the Oriente fault, likely a typical earthquake for this seismic gap.

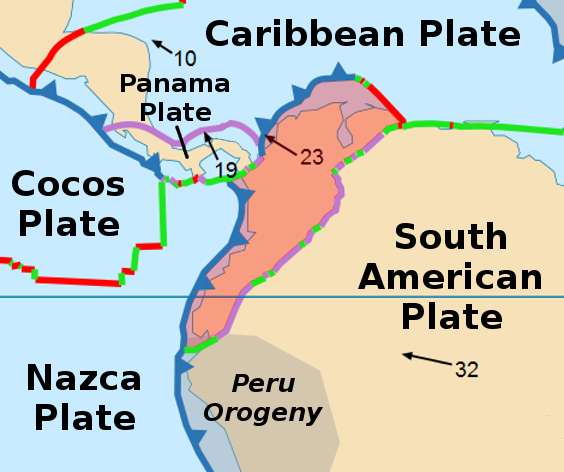
Caribbean plate map

The boundaries of the Caribbean plate showcase a variety of intricate tectonic interactions involving four significant neighboring plates: the North American plate, South American plate, Nazca plate, and Cocos plate. To the north, the North American plate moves westward at a rate of roughly 20 mm per year. This movement is managed by key transform faults, including the Swan Islands Transform Fault and the Septentrional–Oriente fault zone, which stretch from Roatán to Haiti. Farther east, between the Dominican Republic and Barbuda, the interaction between the North American and Caribbean plates grows more complicated. Part of this motion is absorbed by the subduction of the North American plate beneath the Caribbean plate, resulting in the formation of the Puerto Rico Trench and a region of intermediate-depth earthquakes. Further to the south and east, the boundary arcs around Puerto Rico and the northernLesser Antilles, creating an active island arc. The subduction of the North and South American plates under the Caribbean plate, occurring at a pace of 20 mm per year, generates intermediate-depth earthquakes and fuels volcanic activity. Along the southern edge, the plate boundary with the South American plate involves east–west motion, passing through areas like Trinidad and western Venezuela. This segment is defined by prominent transform faults and shallow seismic activity. The Panama fracture zone is the most seismically dynamic transform boundary, located between the Cocos and Nazca plates. It extends to the Galapagos Rift Zone and the Middle America Trench, forming a critical part of the Cocos-Nazca-Caribbean triple junction. Earthquakes here are generally shallow and moderate in magnitude, with faulting primarily exhibiting right-lateral strike-slip behavior.

== Earthquake ==
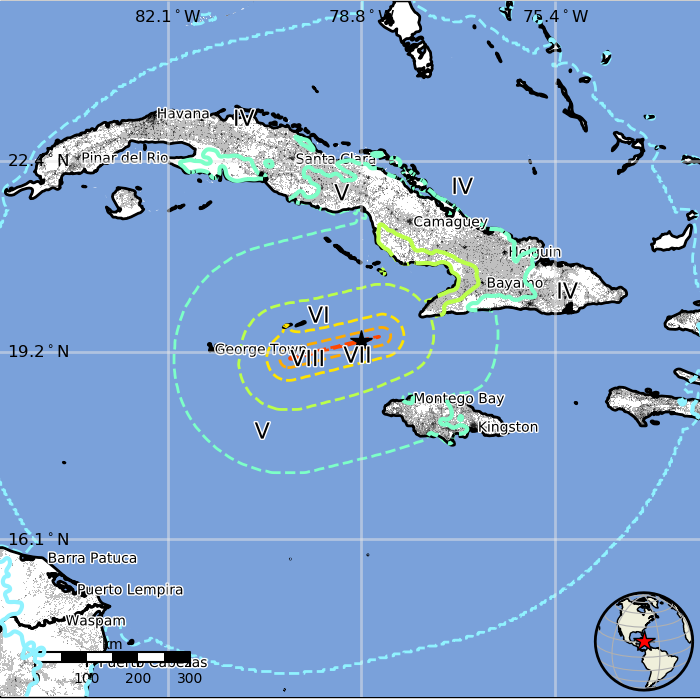
Caribbean earthquake map

=== Caribbean earthquake ===
The earthquake had a magnitude of 7.7 M_{w} and an estimated depth of 14.8 km (9.2 mi). The focal mechanism, combined with an analysis of seismic waveforms, is consistent with strike-slip motion on the Septentrional-Oriente fault zone. The mainshock was followed by a series of aftershocks, with the largest being a 6.1 M_{w} event that occurred less than three hours later, to the southeast of Grand Cayman. The modelled rupture zone extends from just west of the epicenter of the M_{w}6.1 aftershock to just east of the mainshock epicenter, suggesting unilateral westward propagation. Two episodes of supershear rupture have been identified from the inversion of teleseismic P waveforms.

=== Earthquake History in the Caribbean ===
In the Caribbean, earthquakes occur frequently, and sometimes, they cause tsunamis. The largest earthquake in the Caribbean occurred on 8 February 1843; its estimated magnitude is 8.0–8.5 M_{w}, and it caused 4,000–6,000 deaths and strong shaking that caused damage was felt from Sint Maarten to Dominica, even felt 2,000 km away in Washington (state) and Vermont.

The Cibao earthquake was the largest recorded earthquake in the Caribbean in 1946, with a magnitude of 8.1 M_{w}, and caused 75 deaths and 20,000 homeless. This earthquake was continued with aftershocks until 1947–48.

=== Significant Earthquakes in the Caribbean ===
The 1842 Cap-Haïtien earthquake was a major earthquake that took place on the Oriente Fault. The Epicenter of the earthquake was right in between the Dominican Republic and Haiti. The earthquake was around an 8.1 in magnitude and was felt all around the surrounding areas. It destroyed all the nearby cities including: Cap-Haïtien, Port-de-Paix, Mole-Saint-Nicolas, Santiago de los Caballeros, and many more. This earthquake was also much more devastating because it was on land compared the to 2020 Caribbean Earthquake because that epicenter was in the sea. In this earthquake, there was many fatalities. It is estimated that there were roughly 6,000 killed. About 5,000 were killed in the city of Cap-Haïtien alone and another 200–300 more were killed from a tsunami that followed. The rest were killed in other towns surrounding the area.

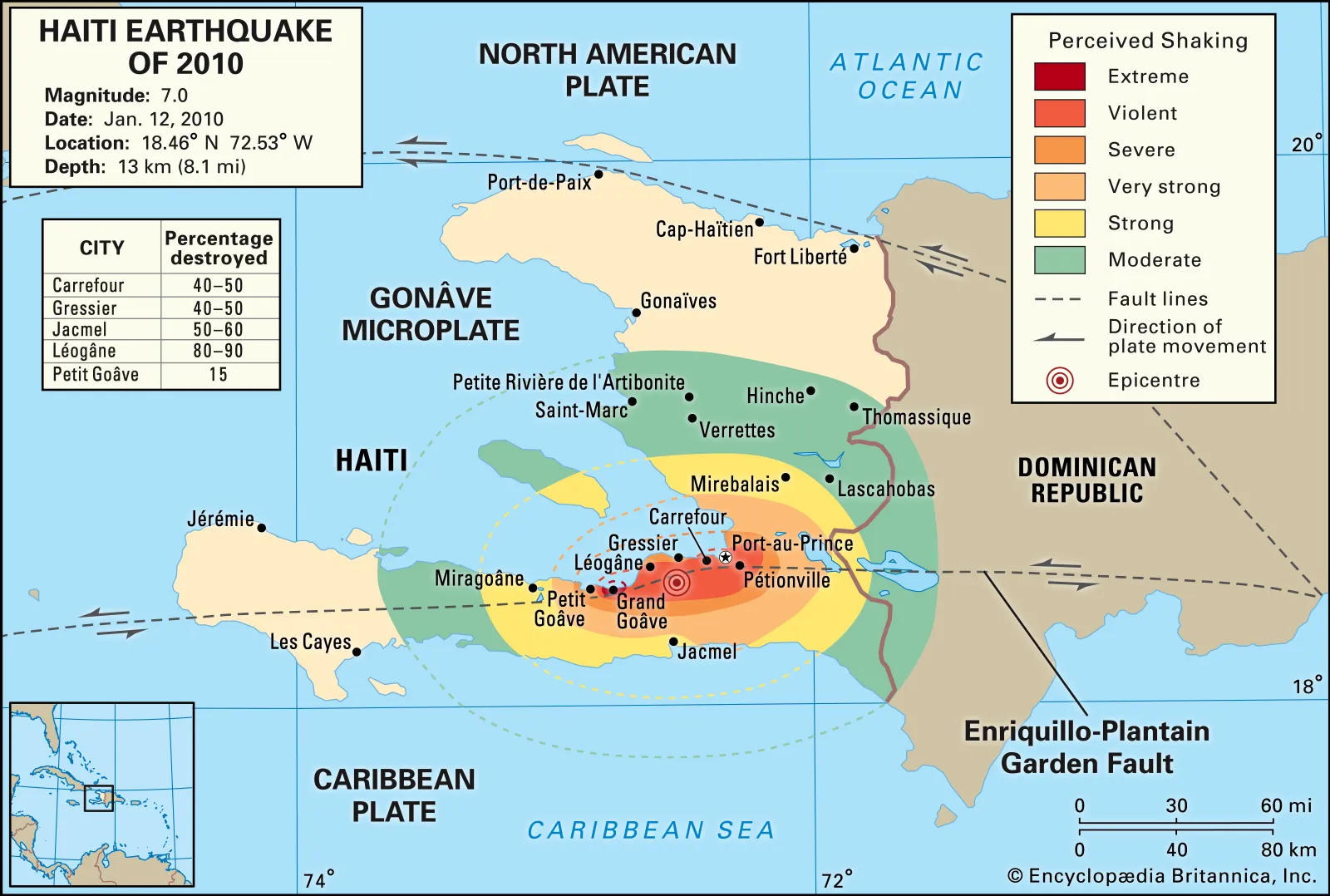
Epicenter of the 2010 Haiti earthquake

Another Earthquake that took place in Haiti nearby, just a little more south, was the 2010 Haiti Earthquake. This earthquake had a magnitude of 7 and the epicenter was 16 miles west of the capital, Port-au-Prince. The depth of the earthquake was very shallow at a depth of about 8 miles, which made the earthquake so much more destructive. Massive damage was done to the infrastructure from the shaking and many important buildings, such as schools, hospitals, and the Presidential Palace were destroyed. Over 1.5 million people were left homeless from their houses being destroyed. A range of roughly 100,000 to more than 300,000 deaths occurred and hundreds of thousands more were left injured. This earthquake was so destructive due to Haiti's weak infrastructure and their lack of disaster preparedness because most people in their country are living in poverty. 2020 Caribbean earthquake occurred on the ocean, but 2010 Haiti earthquake occurred on the continent so there was more damage compared to 2020 Caribbean earthquake.

The 1947 Guantanamo earthquake was another earthquake that took place on the Oriente Fault. The epicenter for this earthquake is about 60 kilometers South-west on Guantanamo, Cuba. The earthquake has a magnitude of roughly 6.8 and was another devastating disaster that took place in Central America. Buildings and structures in the surrounding regions were damaged from the severe shaking. Although there was building collapses damage to the infrastructure, the earthquake itself wasn't as strong as other earthquakes in the area, so there were little to no deaths from this earthquake.

== Impact ==
=== Cayman Islands ===
There were cracked roads and many sinkholes. A minor tsunami of 46 cm (1 ft 6 in) was recorded. All government schools were closed to allow inspections for possible damage, but they were all reopened on 30 January as no major damage had been found that related to the earthquake. Several sinkholes opened up around Grand Cayman and it caused damaged to some vehicles and properties. At least four cars were affected by sinkholes. Owen Roberts International Airport was evacuated after the initial shaking, fortunately, there was no damage to it. There was some structural damage on both Cayman Brac and Grand Cayman. After the quake, some shelters were opened around 2:30 pm for a possible tsunami. Water services were interrupted due to damage to water pipes in some part of Grand Cayman.

=== Jamaica ===
The United States Geological Survey estimated that some parts of Jamaica and Cuba because they were two closest countries from the epicenter. A six-story building on the Mona campus of the University of the West Indies, containing approximately 300 students, was evacuated. Damage was reported from at least two parishes in western Jamaica. Some offices were temporarily evacuated in part of Jamaica. Structural damage in western Jamaica towns like Lucea and Montego Bay were reported. The U.S. Tsunami Warning Center and Pacific Tsunami Warning Center warned a tsunami after the earthquake for Jamaica and some other countries. Minor flooding took place near the western coastline, but no tsunami occurred. Downtown Kingston employees working in high-rise buildings evacuated as a precaution as well.

=== Cuba ===
Tremors were felt on the southern coast of the island. A spokesman for Guantanamo Bay Naval Base stated that there were no reports of damage or injuries. Granma Province was affected by the strongest shaking, being closest to the epicenter. A survey carried out by the National Center for Seismological Research, found that one house had completely collapsed and another 300 showed some damage. The houses affected were all ones that were not in good condition before the earthquake. Damage was also reported from some schools and daycare centers.

=== United States ===
Tremors were felt throughout Florida. Several people self-reported that they felt the earthquake on the Geological Survey's website, with instances including Miami, West Palm Beach, Fort Pierce, Port St. Lucie, Vero Beach, Cocoa and Orlando according to "Did you Feel It?" data, a citizen-reporting tool used to measure the potential reach of earthquakes. In Orlando, the stadium at University of Central Florida shook. Several buildings were evacuated in Miami-Dade County (450 miles away). Several government buildings in Downtown Miami were evacuated, initially on a volunteer basis until a full evacuation was ordered by the local fire department.

=== Mexico ===
Shaking occurred in southern Mexico in places such as Yucatan and Quintana Roo. Areas that had a chance of getting affected were evacuated well before the event due to established protocols. Damage was mild and no casualties occurred.

== See also ==
- List of earthquakes in 2020
- List of earthquakes in Cuba
- List of earthquakes in the Caribbean
