= 1842 Cap-Haïtien earthquake =

Estimated magnitude of 8.1

- Location within Haiti
- UTC time: 1842-05-07
- Local date: 7 May 1842
- Magnitude: 8.1 M_{s}
- Epicenter: 19°45′N 72°12′W
- Areas affected: Haiti
- Max. intensity: MMI IX (Violent)
- Tsunami: Yes
- Casualties: 5,300

The 1842 Cap-Haïtien earthquake occurred at 17:00 local time (21:00 UTC) on 7 May. It had an estimated magnitude of 8.1 on the M_{s} scale and triggered a destructive tsunami. It badly affected the northern coast of Haiti and part of what is now the Dominican Republic. Port-de-Paix suffered the greatest damage from both earthquake and tsunami. Approximately 5,000 people were killed by the effects of the earthquake shaking and another 300 by the tsunami.

== Tectonic setting ==
The island of Hispaniola lies across the complex transform plate boundary between the North American plate and the Caribbean plate. The overall four cm per year displacement along this boundary is split nearly equally between two major dextral (right lateral) strike-slip zones either side of the Gonâve microplate. To the south is the Enriquillo–Plantain Garden fault zone, which extends from Jamaica in the west to the south-east of Hispaniola to the east. In the north the fault zone is the Septentrional-Oriente fault zone passing along the southern margin of Cuba and along the northern part of Hispaniola. Both of these fault zones have been associated with several major historical earthquakes.

== Earthquake ==
The earthquake was felt over a wide area, including southern Cuba, Jamaica, Puerto Rico and across the Antilles. The estimated intensity reached IX (Violent) on the Mercalli intensity scale along the northern coast from Cap-Haïtien to Santiago de los Caballeros.

The earthquake appears to have been caused by movement on the Septentrional Fault, with the rupture extending from the Cibao valley in the present day Dominican Republic, along the whole of the northern coast of Haiti.

== Tsunami ==
The tsunami affected the northern coast of Haiti and present-day Dominican Republic. The highest run-up of 4.6 m was observed at Port-de-Paix, with 2 m run-ups seen along much of the northern coast. At Saint John in the United States Virgin Islands, the run-up was 3.1 m.

== Damage ==
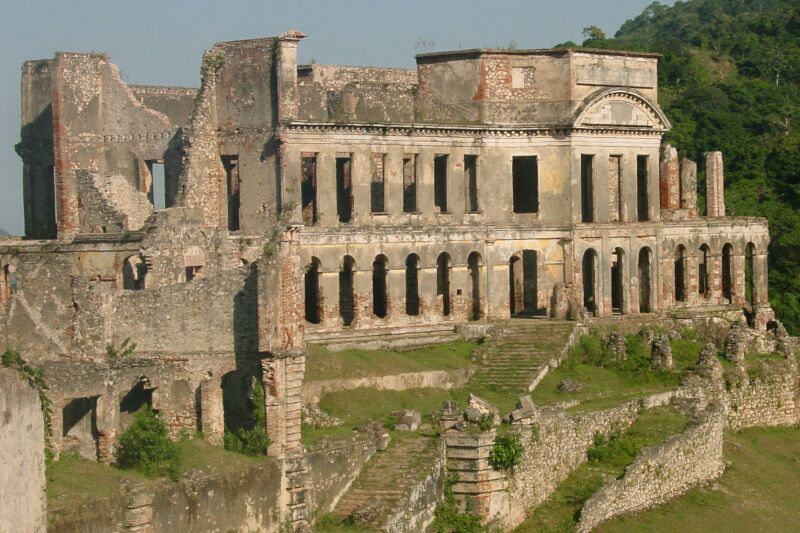
The ruins of the Sans-Souci Palace, severely damaged in the earthquake and never rebuilt

The region that suffered the greatest damage was the northern Cape area, although there was significant damage along the northern coast as far as Santiago de los Caballeros (now in the Dominican Republic). The towns of Cap-Haïtien, Port-de-Paix, Môle-Saint-Nicolas and Fort-Liberté were also severely affected. Henri Christophe's Sans-Souci Palace was badly damaged and was never rebuilt.

At Port-de-Paix, the sea drew back 60 m, before returning and flooding the city in 5 m of water, killing between 200–300 of the inhabitants. The effect of the tsunami at Môle-Saint-Nicolas was catastrophic, leaving almost none of the town standing.

== Aftermath ==
Despite the devastation caused by the earthquake President Boyer did not visit the affected areas and this led to an increase in opposition to his rule. The chaos also allowed groups allied to Juan Pablo Duarte to link up with others opposed to Boyer.

== Future seismic hazard ==
The results of trenching across the Septentrional Fault in the Ciabo valley have identified large earthquakes, similar in character to that in 1842, at around 1230 and another historical event in 1562. Assuming that these earthquakes were caused by displacement on the same segment of the fault, a recurrence interval of about 300 years is indicated, similar to that proposed for the Enriquillo fault in the southern part of the island.

== See also ==
- List of earthquakes in Haiti
- List of historical earthquakes
- List of tsunamis
