= 1692 Jamaica earthquake =

Earthquake and tsunami in British Jamaica

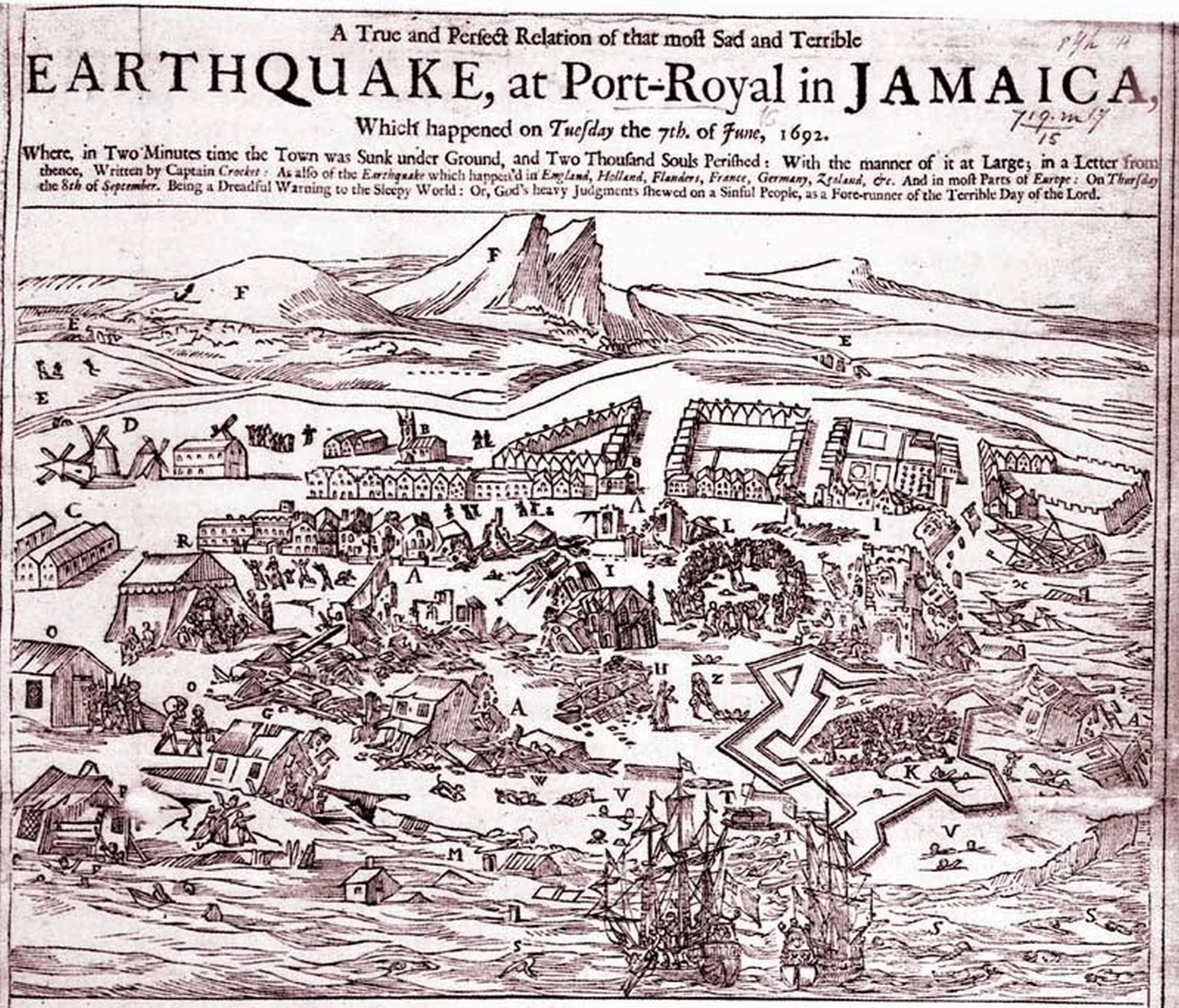

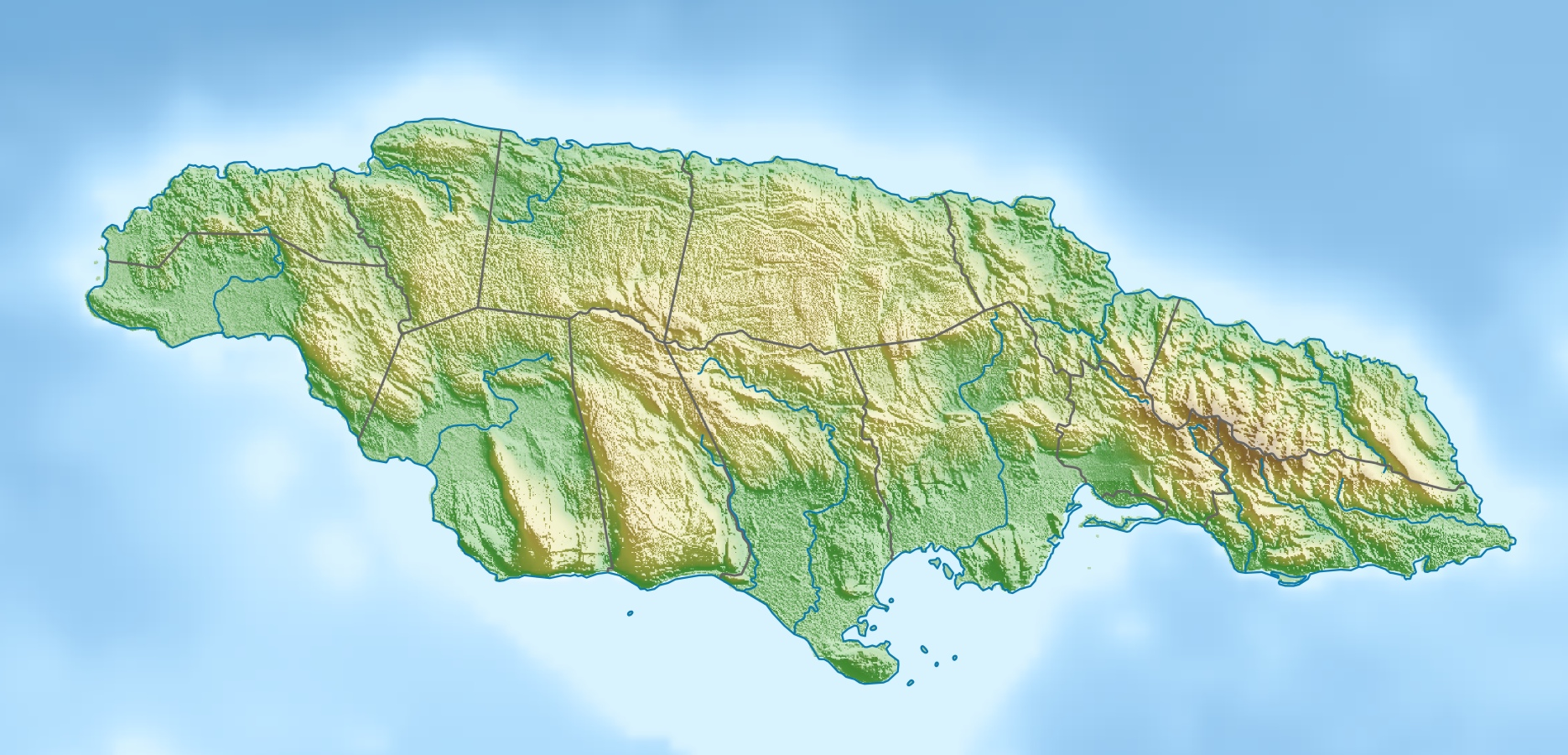
- Location within Jamaica
- Local date: 7 June 1692; 334 years ago
- Local time: 11:43
- Magnitude: 7.5 M_{w}
- Depth: 10 km (6.2 mi)
- Epicenter: 18.00°N 76.5°W
- Areas affected: Jamaica
- Tsunami: Yes
- Casualties: Around 5,000

The 1692 Jamaica earthquake struck Port Royal, Jamaica, on 7 June. A stopped pocket watch found in the harbour during a 1959 excavation indicated that it occurred around 11:43 AM local time.

Known as the "storehouse and treasury of the West Indies" and as the "wickedest city in the world", Port Royal was, at the time, a key city in colonial Jamaica and one of the busiest and wealthiest ports in the Americas, as well as a common home port for many of the privateers and pirates operating on the Caribbean Sea.

The 1692 earthquake caused most of the city to sink below sea level. About 2,000 people died as a result of the earthquake and the following tsunami, and another 3,000 people died in the following days due to injuries and disease.

== Tectonic setting ==
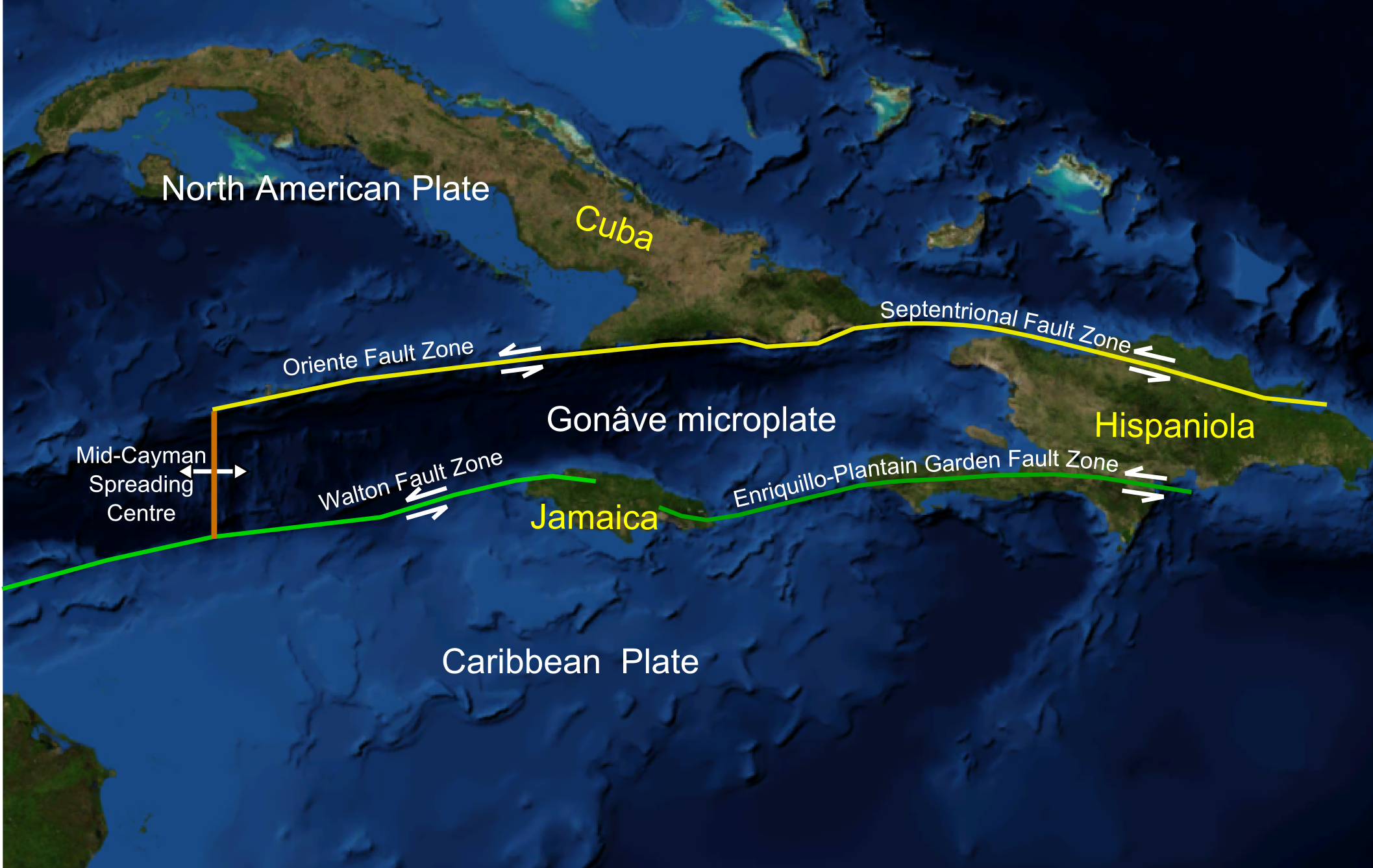
The Gonâve microplate, showing the main fault zones that bound it

Jamaica lies on the boundary between the Caribbean plate and the Gonâve microplate. The Gonâve microplate is a 1,100 km (680 mi) long strip of mainly oceanic crust formed by the Cayman spreading ridge within a strike-slip pull-apart basin on the northern transform margin of the Caribbean plate with the North American plate. Jamaica was formed by uplift associated with a restraining bend along this strike-slip structure. The focal mechanisms of earthquakes around Jamaica are primarily sinistral strike-slip along WSW-ENE trending faults and minor reverse or thrust motion on NW-SE trending faults. The 1692 event is thought to have occurred on one of these strike-slip faults.

== Damage ==
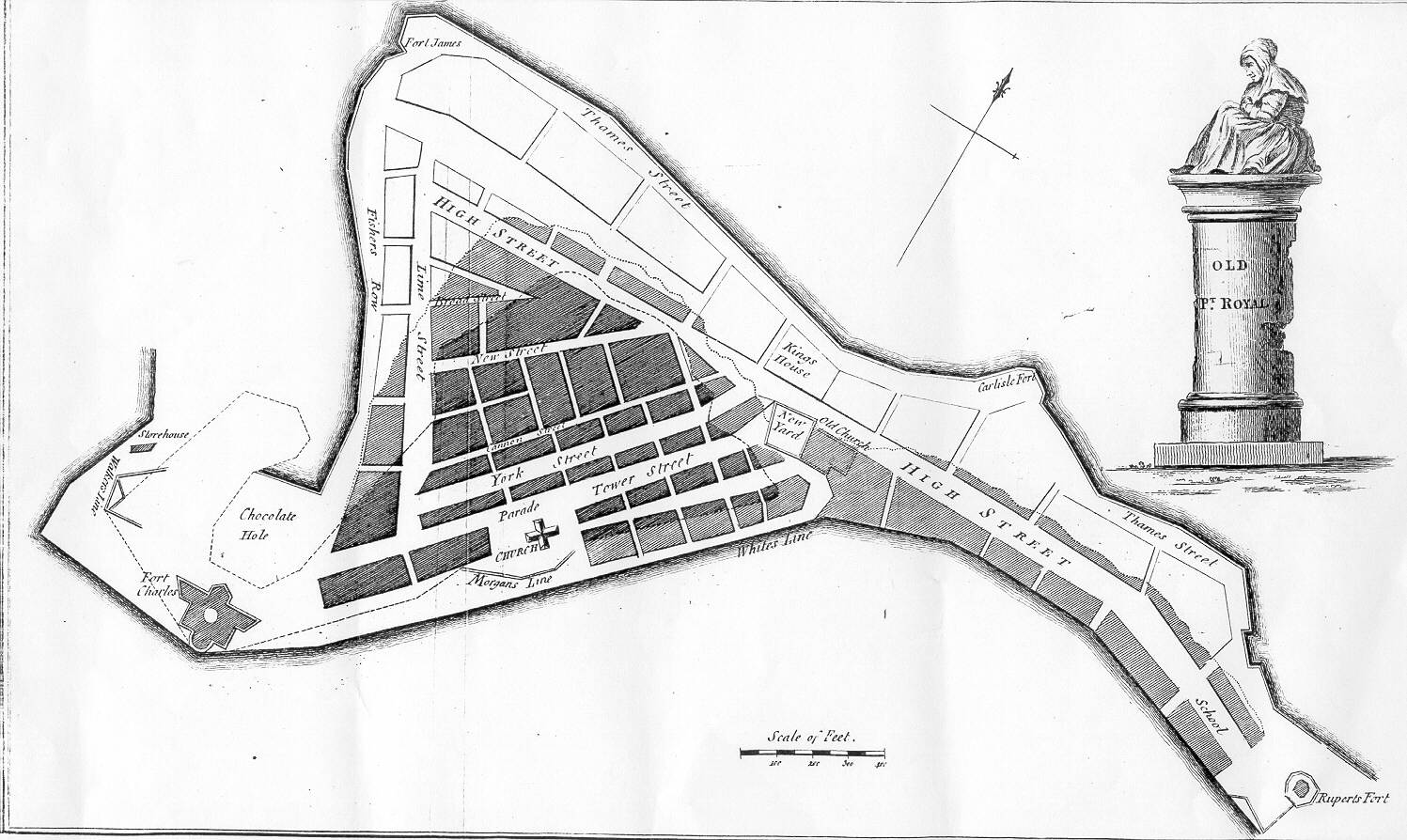
Old map of Port Royal. Light section at top and going down toward the right is the part of the city lost in the 1692 earthquake; slightly shaded middle section, the part of the city that was flooded; darkly shaded bottom section is the part of the city that survived.

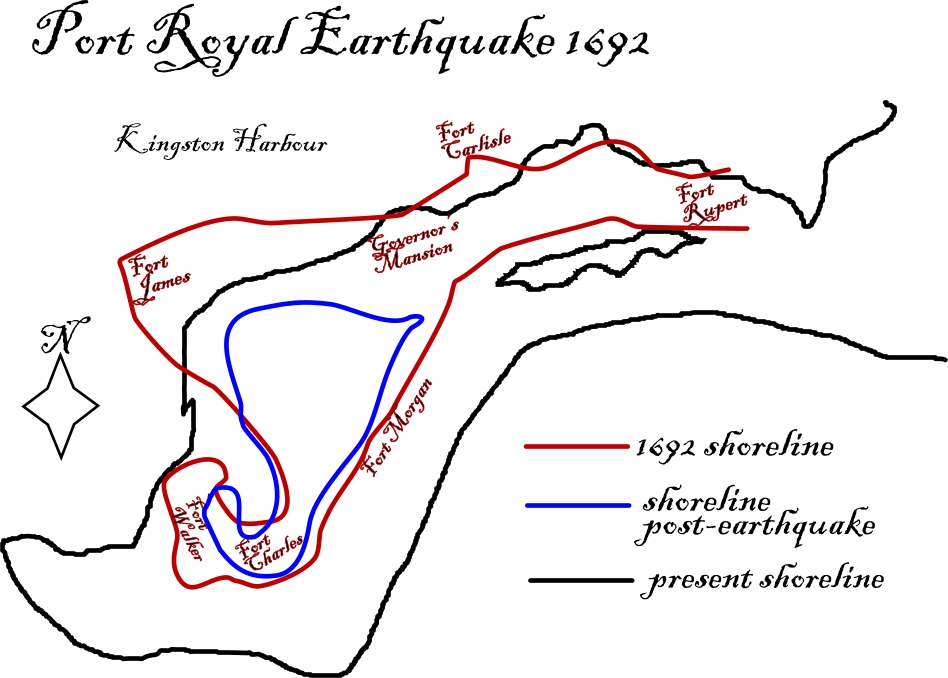
Map of Port Royal showing shorelines before and after the earthquake

Two-thirds of the town, about 13 ha (33 acres), sank into the sea immediately after the main shock. According to Robert Renny in his An History of Jamaica (1807): "All the wharves sunk at once, and in the space of two minutes, nine-tenths of the city were covered with water, which was raised to such a height, that it entered the uppermost rooms of the few houses which were left standing. The tops of the highest houses were visible in the water and surrounded by the masts of vessels, which had been sunk along with them."

Before the earthquake the town consisted of 6,500 inhabitants living in about 2,000 buildings, many constructed of brick and with more than one storey, and all built on loose sand. During the shaking, the sand liquefied and the buildings, along with their occupants, appeared to flow into the sea. More than twenty ships moored in the harbour were capsized. One ship, the frigate HMS Swann, was carried over the rooftops by the tsunami. During the main shock, the sand was said to have formed waves. Fissures repeatedly opened and closed, crushing many people. After the shaking stopped the sand again solidified, trapping many victims. Palisadoes cemetery, where the grave of the former pirate Sir Henry Morgan was located, was one of the parts of the city to fall into the sea; his body has never been found.

At Liguanea (present-day Kingston), all the houses were destroyed and water was ejected from 12-metre (40-foot) deep wells. Almost all the houses at St. Jago (Spanish Town) were destroyed.

Many landslides occurred across the island. The largest, the Judgement Cliff landslide, killed 19 people, although heavy rains a few months later may have been the final trigger. Several rivers were temporarily dammed and a few days after the earthquakes the harbour became flooded with large numbers of trees stripped of their bark brought down after one of these dams was breached.

A pocket watch, made in the Netherlands by the French maker Blondel in about 1686, was recovered during underwater archaeological investigations led by Edwin Link in 1959. The watch was stopped with its hands pointing to 11:43 AM; this matches well with contemporary accounts of the timing of the earthquake.

== Aftermath ==
Even before the destruction was complete, some of the survivors began looting, breaking into homes and warehouses. The dead were also robbed and stripped, and, in some cases, had fingers cut off to remove the rings that they wore.

In the immediate aftermath of the earthquake, it was common to ascribe the destruction to divine retribution on the people of Port Royal for their sinful ways. Members of the Jamaica Council declared: "We are become by this an instance of God Almighty's severe judgement." This view of the disaster was not confined to Jamaica; in Boston, the Reverend Cotton Mather said in a letter to his uncle: "Behold, an accident speaking to all our English America".

After the earthquake, the town was partially rebuilt. But the colonial government was relocated to Spanish Town, which had been the capital under Spanish rule. Port Royal was devastated by a fire in 1703 and a hurricane in 1722. Most of the sea trade moved to Kingston. By the late 18th century, Port Royal was largely abandoned.

== Characteristics ==
=== Earthquake ===
There were three separate shocks, each with increasing intensity, culminating in the main shock. The estimated size of the event was 7.5 on the moment magnitude scale.

Despite reports of the town flowing into the sea, the main result of the earthquake was subsidence caused by liquefaction. This would also explain an eyewitness account of houses being swallowed and people being buried up to their necks in the sand. The probable triggering of the Judgement Cliff landslide during the earthquake occurred along the line of the Plantain Garden fault. Movement on this structure has been suggested as the cause of the earthquake.

=== Landslides ===
The Judgement Cliff landslide is a complex rock-slide slump with a volume of about 131–181 million m^{3} and displaced the land surface by up to 800 metres (2,625 ft). The slip surface is found within zones of clay and shale with gypsum at the base of a limestone unit. This landslide occurred after the earthquake but it remains possible that heavy rain during a hurricane in October later that year was the final trigger for the slip, as the exact date of the landslide is uncertain.

=== Tsunami ===
The sea was observed to retreat by about 300 yd (270 m) at Liguanea (probably near Kingston) while at Yallahs it withdrew 1 mi (1.6 km). It returned as a 6 ft (1.8 m) high wave that swept over the land. One possible cause of the tsunami is thought to be the slump and grain flow into the harbour from beneath the town itself, although the waves in the harbour may be better described as seiches and larger waves reported elsewhere, such as at Saint Ann's Bay, are explained as the result of an entirely separate submarine landslide, also triggered by the earthquake.

== Future seismic hazard ==
Estimates of current deformation of Jamaica suggest that sufficient strain has accumulated to generate a M=7.0–7.3 earthquake, similar in size to the 1692 event. This may mean that a repeat of this event is imminent, although this estimate relies on many assumptions, such as that none of the motion on the Plantain Garden fault is accommodated by aseismic creep.

== See also ==
- List of historical earthquakes
- List of earthquakes in the Caribbean
