= Beebe Hydrothermal Vent Field =

Hydrothermal vent site near Grand Cayman in the Caribbean

Beebe Vent Field
- A series of vents on the Mid-Cayman Spreading Center.
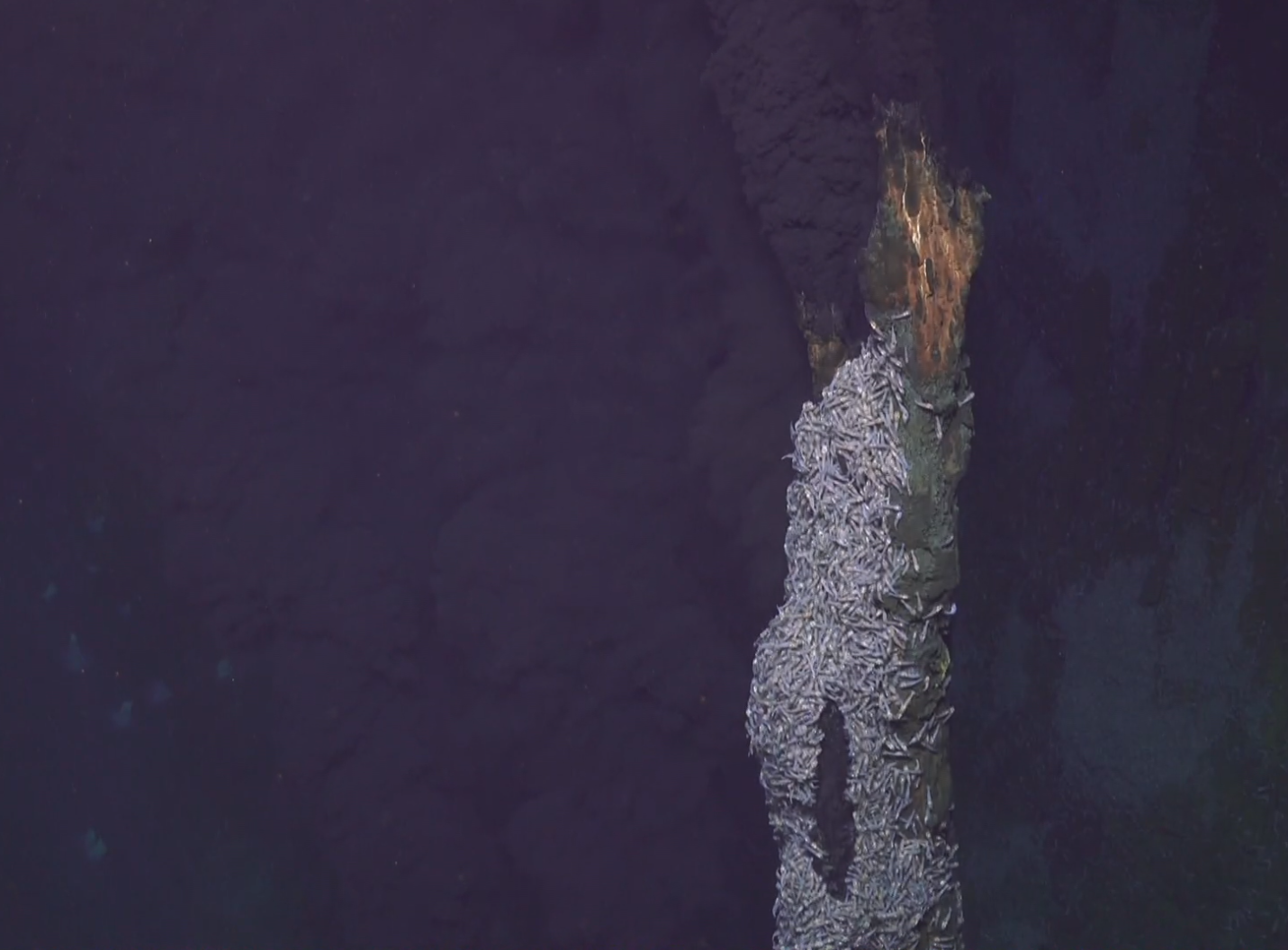
- A tall sulfide chimney covered in shrimp

- Location within Earth
- Location: Mid-Cayman Rise
- Coordinates: 18°32′48″N 81°43′6″W
- Area: 22,050 square metres (237,300 sq ft)
- Max. elevation: −4,957 metres (−16,263 ft)
- Min. elevation: −4,987 metres (−16,362 ft)

The Beebe Hydrothermal Vent Field (abbreviated BVF, also known as the Piccard Vent Field) is the world's deepest known hydrothermal vent site and is located just south of Grand Cayman in the Caribbean, on the north side of the Mid-Cayman Spreading Centre in the Cayman Trough. Approximately 24 kilometres (15 mi) south of Beebe is the Von Damm Vent Field.

At nearly 5,000 metres (16,000 ft) below sea level, it is one of the few known hydrothermal vent sites in the abyssopelagic zone. The hydrothermal plume nicknamed "Piccard" was detected in 2010, and the Beebe site was confirmed later that year. The combined depth and vent fluid temperature make it a popular site for studying aqueous thermodynamics, high-pressure biology, and geochemistry.

== Expedition history ==
The Beebe vent field was initially detected in October 2009 by CTD, Eh, and optical backscatter anomalies in the water column above the Mid-Cayman Rise aboard the R/V Cape Hatteras. The team deployed HROV Nereus to conduct surveys which identified a double hydrothermal plume at 3,900 metres (12,800 ft) and 4,250 m (13,940 ft) deep and subsequently nicknamed it "Piccard". From collected plume samples, the team were able to predict the approximate location of the vent field at a depth of approximately 5,000 m (16,000 ft) deep, usurping the Ashadze vent field (Mid-Atlantic Ridge, 4,200 m (13,800 ft)) as the deepest known hydrothermal field.

In 2010, the RRS James Cook's 44th voyage returned to the Mid-Cayman Rise to survey the areas predicted to host hydrothermal sites in 2009. The team deployed the AUV Autosub6000 to map anomalies and RUV HyBIS to collect video, visually confirming the site named "Beebe" after William Beebe at a depth of 4,960 m (16,270 ft).

The vent field was further explored by the NOAAS Okeanos Explorer in 2011, R/V Falkor cruise FK008 and R/V Yokosuka cruise YK13-05 in 2013, and cruises AT18-16 and AT42-22 of the R/V Atlantis in 2012 and 2020 respectively.

== Geography ==
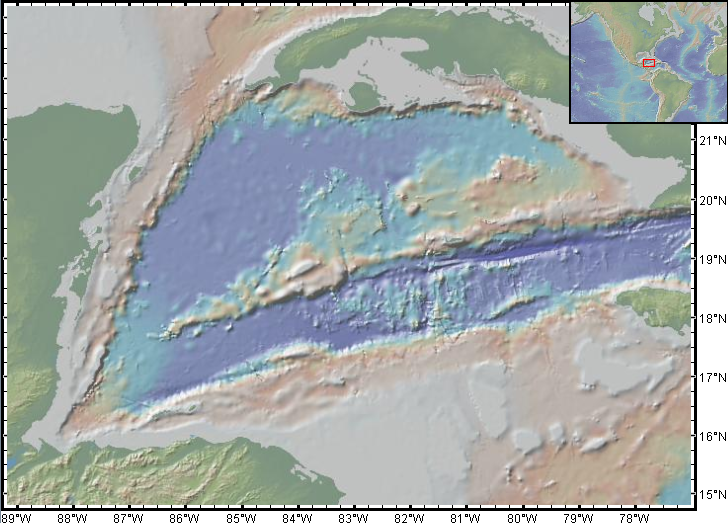
Bathymetry profile of the Mid-Cayman trough and spreading center

The Beebe vent field is in the Caribbean Sea, at the northern end of the Mid-Cayman Rise on the segments closest to the Septentrional-Oriente fault zone.

The Beebe vent field consists of seven sulfide mounds on the western side of the spreading center, the majority of which are inactive. Central to the field are the main endmember vents, known as Beebe 1–5, which branch from the same mound. Surrounding these endmember vents are Hot Chimlet to the north, Beebe Sea to the East, and Beebe Woods to the South. The series of mounds continue to the northeast of the field, where high-temperature hydrothermal activity used to take place, as evidenced by extinct chimneys.

The vent field is in the territorial waters of the Cayman Islands, which is a self-governing British Overseas Territory.

== Geology ==
The Beebe vent field is located in the very near vicinity of the spreading center, which has been described as an ultraslow ridge at a rate of 15 millimetres (0.59 in) to 16.9 millimetres (0.67 in) per year. The area is primarily basalt, with metal-sulfide mounds and talus sourced from hydrothermal activity.

Unlike the Von Damm Vent Field, there is little sediment cover at Beebe.

=== Chimneys ===
Profuse venting at the Beebe Vent Field

Beebe vents 1–5 form a branching complex consisting of pyrite, pyrrhotite, and other oxidized metal-sulfides. These chimneys emit the hottest fluids of anywhere within the field, up to 403 °C (757 °F). Beebe Woods to the south has a similar geological composition, though temperatures are cooled slightly (354 °C (669 °F)). These temperatures are hot enough that iron and other metals have not yet precipitated, giving the chimneys a distinctive black-smoker appearance. These metal-sulfide chimneys are conductive of precious and semi-precious mineral precipitation, such as gold, silver, and copper.

Hot Chimlet to the north features venting at a significantly lower temperature (149 °C (300 °F)), such that the fluids are clear and devoid of metals. Residing on the slope of the mound, the Hot Chimlet site has a light dusting of sulfide materials likely sourced from the center of the field. Hot Chimlet also does not have the impressive chimney structures as at the center of the field, and requires the use of dive markers to identify quickly. Shrimp Gulley, similarly, is a location within the Beebe Sea which is distinguished by abundant biology. The Gulley reaches temperatures around 45 °C (113 °F), with markers also required to find the exact locations of diffuse flow.

== Chemistry ==
As with many basalt-hosted systems, Beebe has endmember fluids that are highly acidic in association with basalt dissolution reactions. Such reactions with basalt can be favorable in forming hydrothermal ore deposits. Concentrations of carbon dioxide and hydrogen sulfide are elevated relative to deep sea water, attributed to origin in the mantle.

The vent field hosts two main areas of black smoker venting, with a fluid at temperatures of over 400 °C (752 °F) and a low salinity of about 2.3 wt% NaCl. Under these conditions, the venting fluids surpass the supercritical threshold of seawater at 407 °C (765 °F) and 298 bar, and is one of few vent sites shown to host sustained supercritical venting. These hot, acidic conditions make precipitation of metal-sulfide chimneys possible, also giving the hottest vents their characteristic black-smoker appearance from high concentrations of dissolved metals.

Measurements of iron and manganese at Beebe suggest subsurface temperatures of 452 °C (846 °F) or higher.

=== Organic compounds ===
High temperatures acting on seawater can cause diagenesis or pyrolysis of organic compounds, such that they break up into smaller compounds or alter bond configurations. Small quantities of alkanes have been detected, likely derived from hydrothermally-altered compounds of deep seawater. At cooler venting areas, formate and other organic acids have been detected in low concentrations, as high concentrations of carbon dioxide and hydrogen gas may thermodynamically favor abiotic organic acid synthesis.

With abundant iron in the venting plume, there have been many models examining the potential of ligands binding to iron when mixing begins with seawater. These ligands prevent the precipitation of iron in mineral phases, potentially making them bioavailable.

== Biology ==
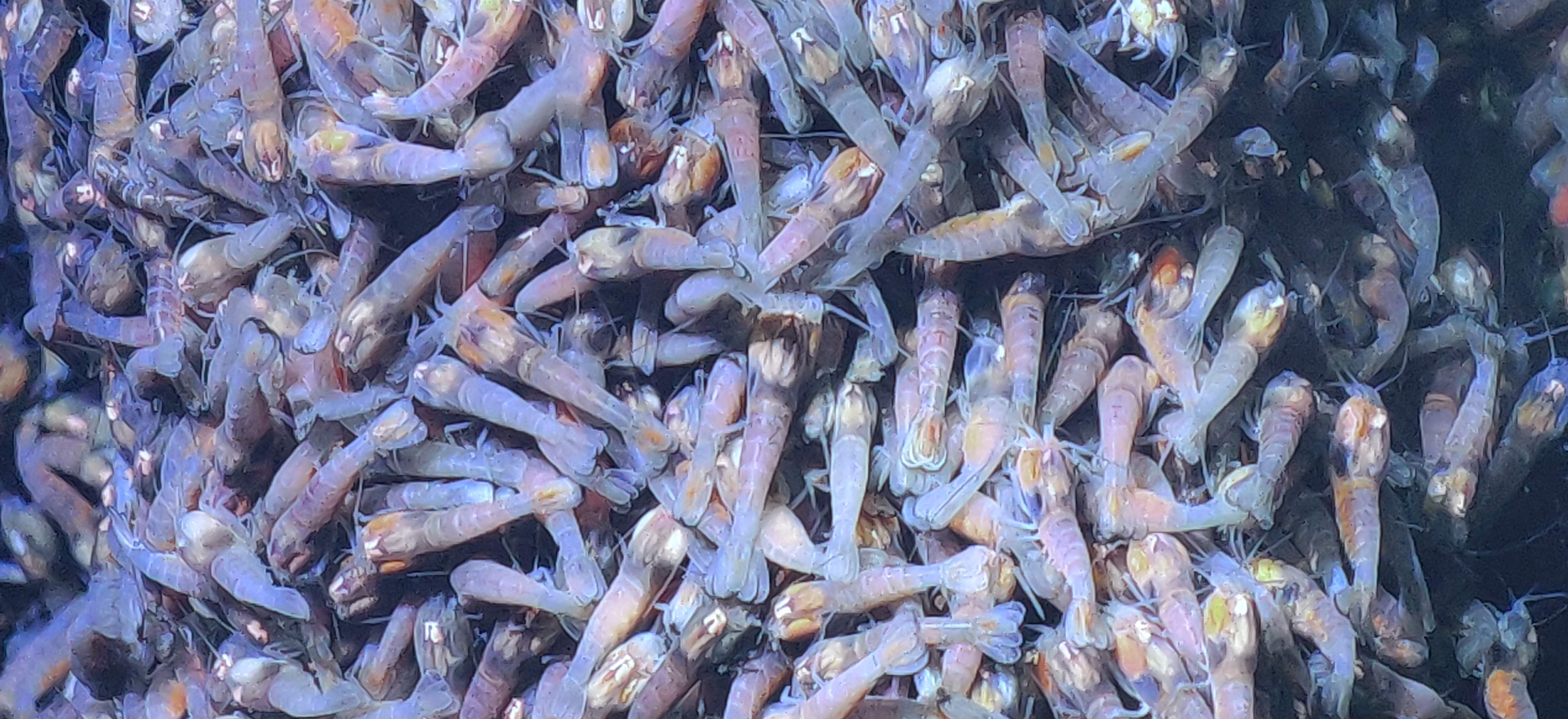
Rimicaris hybisae at the Beebe Vent Field

Beebe has an abundance of shrimp present at venting orifices, particularly those of Rimicaris hybisae, belonging to the family of Alvinocarididae, and are almost completely blind. These shrimp have eyes as juveniles but lose them as they age, developing a light-sensing organ that they can use to detect the infrared glow of hot, venting locations. The shrimp at the Beebe vent field are unique from those found at the Von Damm field in that they are a slightly more brown color due to the high concentrations of iron pumped out by the vents. Observations of shrimp behavior suggests that, when in dense congregations, shrimp ascertain carbohydrates from chemosynthetic bacteria. Though not directly observed, shrimp may predate on other organisms or exhibit cannibalism when more sparsely distributed.

There is also an abundance of deep sea anemones, Provannid gastropods, and squat lobsters. As with other vent fields, it is possible for deepwater sharks or roaming fishes such as grenadiers to appear around the field.

=== Microbiology ===
From a microbial standpoint, there are visible mats of microbial activity at both the Beebe and Von Damm vent systems. Exposed rocks have shown filamentous bacteria and orange sediments around the field, where microorganisms such as Beggiatoa are suggested to utilize hydrogen sulfide in venting fluids to metabolize chemosynthetically. Some of these microorganisms are present on or within vent crustaceans, being routinely grazed or taking up roles as symbiotic organisms.

At lower-temperature venting locations, Sulfurovum have been identified as a dominant bacteria whereas Methanothermacoccus is an abundant archaea. Geochemical calculations suggest that multiple metabolisms other than hydrogen consumption are favorable in these conditions.

== Naming ==
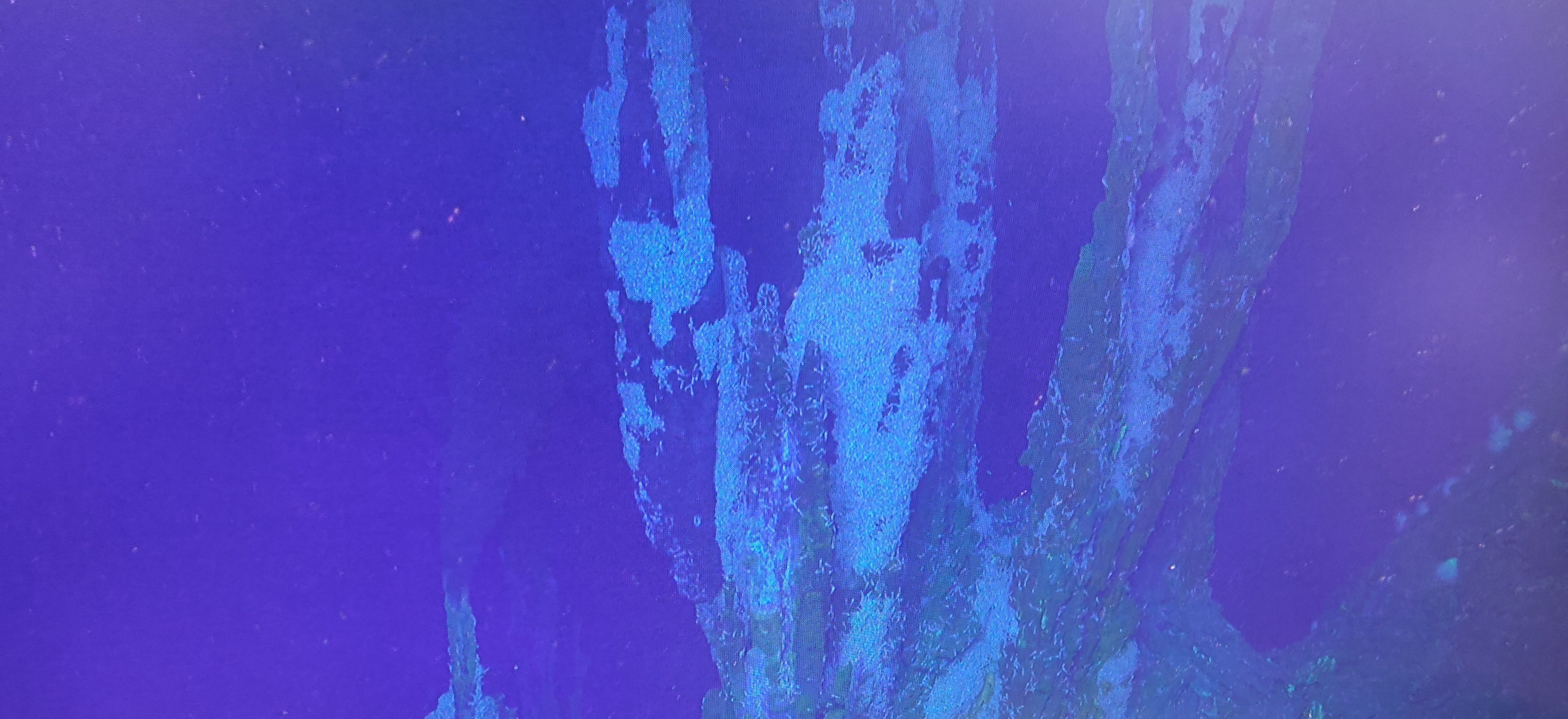
Approaching the Beebe vent complex at the Beebe (Piccard) hydrothermal field

The hydrothermal system was suggested to exist on an American-led oceanographic cruise in 2009 on the R/V Cape Hatteras, with 3 hydrothermal plumes detected in the water column: Piccard, Walsh, and Europa. Beebe was visually confirmed in early 2010 on a British-led expedition with the RRS James Cook, though the Piccard plume could not be found, so the vent field was named Beebe. Americans returned to the vent field in 2011 on the Okeanos Explorer prior to scientific publications from the previous mission, and named the vent field Piccard, therefore creating a second name for the vent field. The Interridge Database lists the vent field as Beebe, though many American journals publish results under the name of Piccard.

The original name for the detected plume, Piccard, comes from Jacques Piccard, a Swiss oceanographer that dove with Don Walsh to the Challenger Deep. The subsequent naming of the field to Beebe is after the American naturalist William Beebe who frequently dove in the Bathysphere prior to powered submersibles.

== Human impacts ==
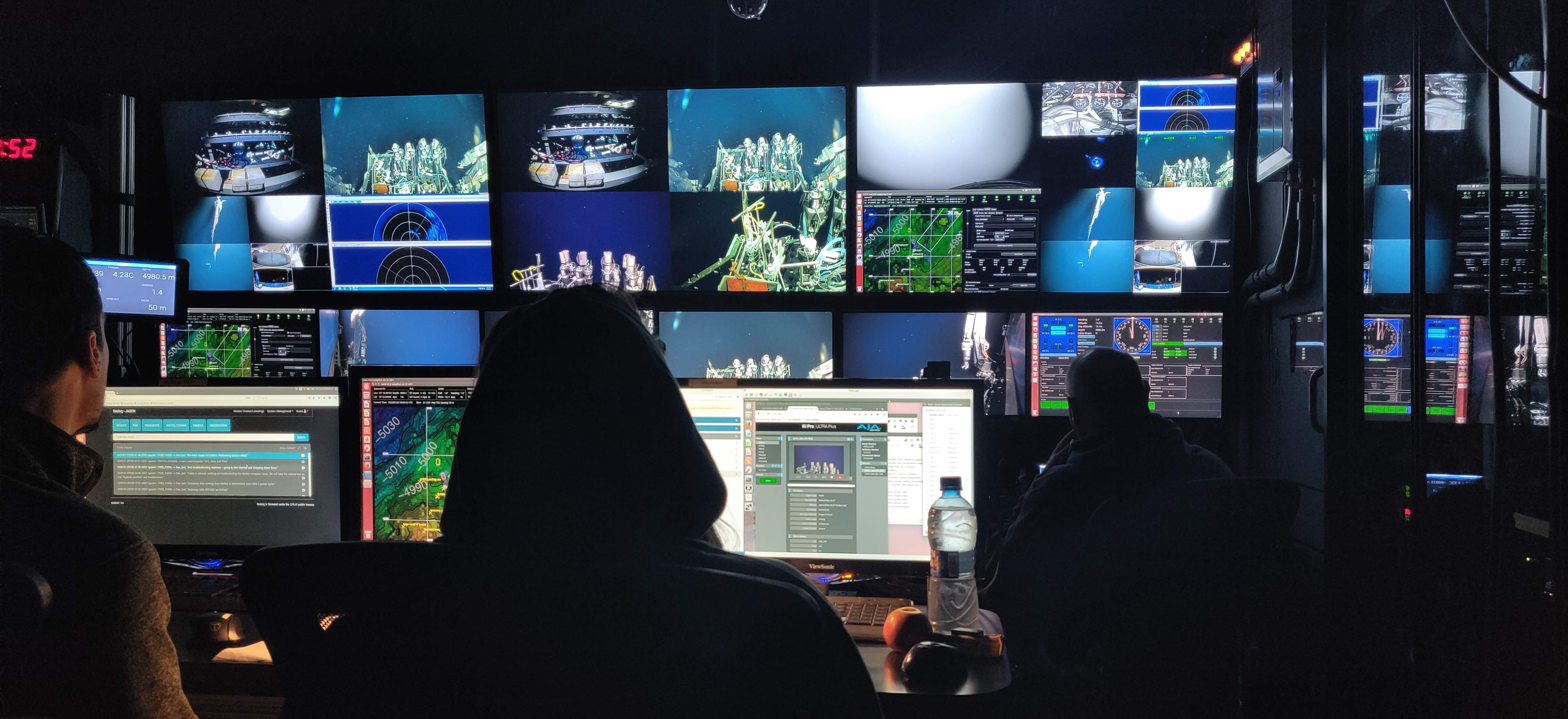
A research team dives at the Beebe vents in 2020.

Since 2010, the Beebe vent field has been explored multiple times by scientists to try to collect samples and videos. Common ecosystem disruptions during hydrothermal expeditions, such as rock collections and artificial illumination, may damage organism photoreceptors at Beebe.

In 2013, cruise YK-13-05 by the Japan Agency for Marine-Earth Science and Technology (JAMSTEC) was undertaken to sample and live stream dives of the DSV Shinkai 6500. However, the fiber optical cable was broken during spooling multiple times and was not fully recovered. Uncertainty in cable presence is a potential hazard for human-operated submersibles such as the DSV Alvin, which did not dive at Beebe due to safety concerns.

Beebe's metal sulfides are rich in gold and other industrial elements, which could make deep-sea mining a concern.
