= Septentrional–Oriente fault zone =

Faults that runs along Hispaniola, Haiti, the Dominican Republic, and Cuba

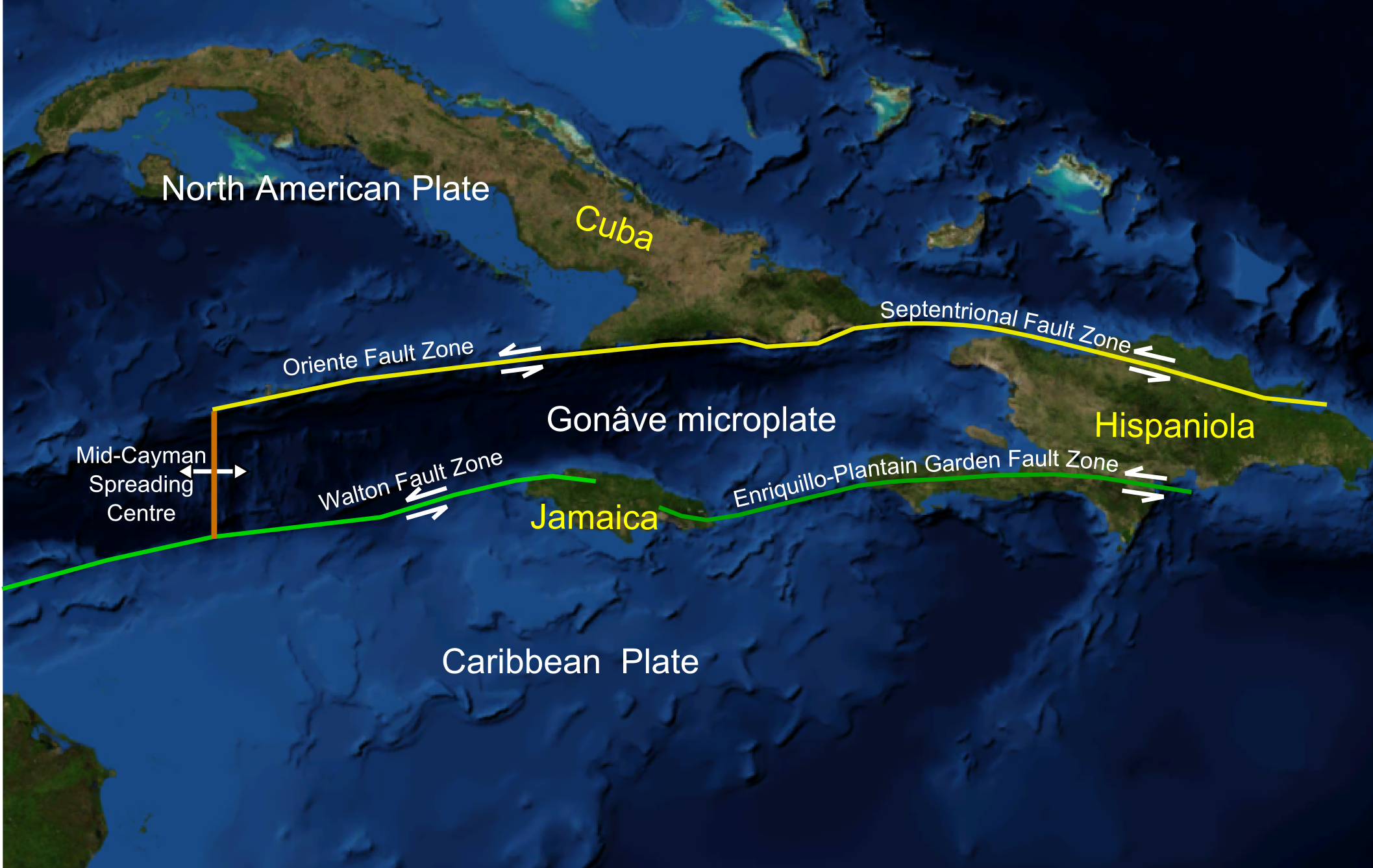
The Gonâve microplate, showing location of the main fault zones

The Septentrional–Orient fault zone (SOFZ) is a system of active coaxial left lateral-moving strike slip faults that runs along the northern side of the island of Hispaniola where Haiti and the Dominican Republic are located and continues along the south of Cuba along the northern margin of the Cayman Trough. The SOFZ shares approximately half of the relative motion between the North American and Caribbean tectonic plates with the Enriquillo-Plantain Garden fault zone and Walton fault zone which run along the southern side of Hispaniola and aong the southern margin of the Cayman Trough. Both fault zones terminate at the Mid-Cayman Rise to the west. Some researchers believe that the Enriquillo-Plantain Garden fault zone and the SOFZ bound a microplate, dubbed the Gonâve microplate, a 190,000 km^{2} (73,000 sq mi) area of the northern Caribbean plate that is in the process of shearing off the Caribbean plate and accreting to the North America plate.

In 1766 a devastating earthquake struck Cuba killing 40 to 120 inhabitants. And in 1842 a major tremor on this fault destroyed the city of Cap-Haïtien and other cities in the northern part of Haiti and the Dominican Republic on 7 May 1842. In January 2020, there was an M 7.7 earthquake on this fault between the southern tip of Cuba and the Cayman Islands that involved episodes of supershear rupture.

== See also ==
- List of earthquakes in Cuba
- List of earthquakes in Haiti
- List of earthquakes in the Dominican Republic
