= Gonave =

Gonave may refer to:

- Gulf of Gonâve
- Gonâve Island
- Gonâve Microplate

== See also ==
- Gonaïves
