= Mid-Cayman Rise =

Plate boundary

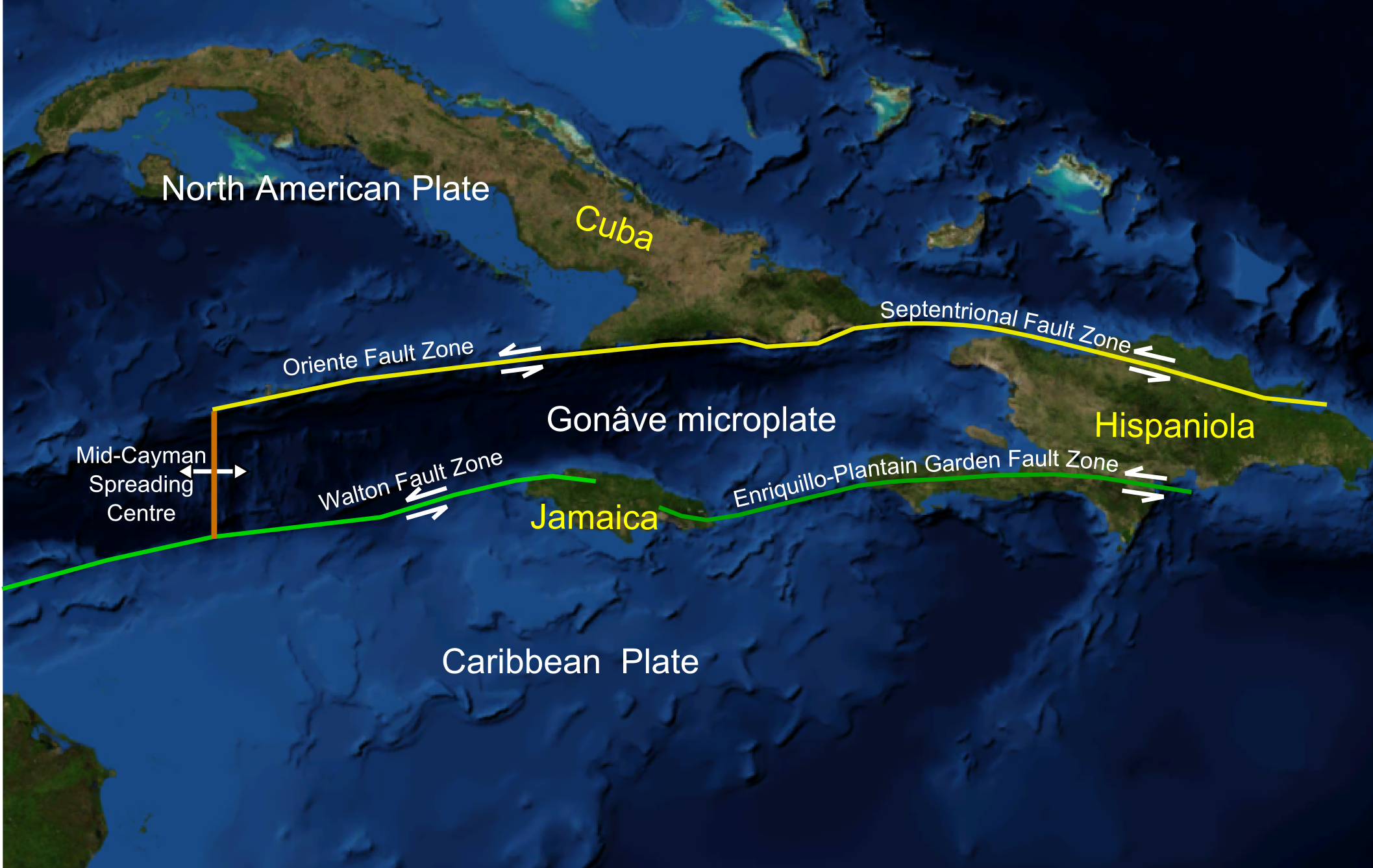
The location of the Mid-Cayman Rise

The Mid-Cayman Rise or Mid-Cayman Spreading Center is a relatively short (110 km long) mid-ocean ridge and divergent plate boundary running south from Grand Cayman Island, in the middle of the Cayman Trough. It forms part of a dominantly transform boundary that is part of the southern margin to the North American Plate. It is an ultra-slow spreading center where the North American Plate is rifting away from the Caribbean Plate with an opening rate of 15–17 mm per year.

== Formation ==
The Mid-Cayman Rise developed during the Eocene when the northern part of the Caribbean Plate collided with the Bahamas Platform, forcing the southern boundary to propagate southwards. This boundary initially formed as two strike-slip faults with a large left-stepping offset between them, generating a pull-apart basin. Continuing movement on the boundary and extension within the pull-apart led to the formation of an area of oceanic crust containing a north-south trending spreading center that remains active to the present day.

When the spreading center formed, all the displacement on the Swan Islands Transform Fault was transferred by the Mid-Cayman Rise to the Septentrional-Oriente fault zone. During the Late Miocene, the leading edge of the Caribbean Plate began to collide with the Bahamas Platform. This led to the development of a new fault system, formed of the Walton fault zone and the Enriquillo–Plantain Garden fault zone, carrying some of the plate boundary displacement and creating the Gonâve Microplate. Eventually all the displacement on the plate boundary is expected to move onto the southern fault system as the microplate becomes accreted to the North American Plate, at which point the Mid-Cayman Rise will become extinct.

== Hydrothermal vents ==
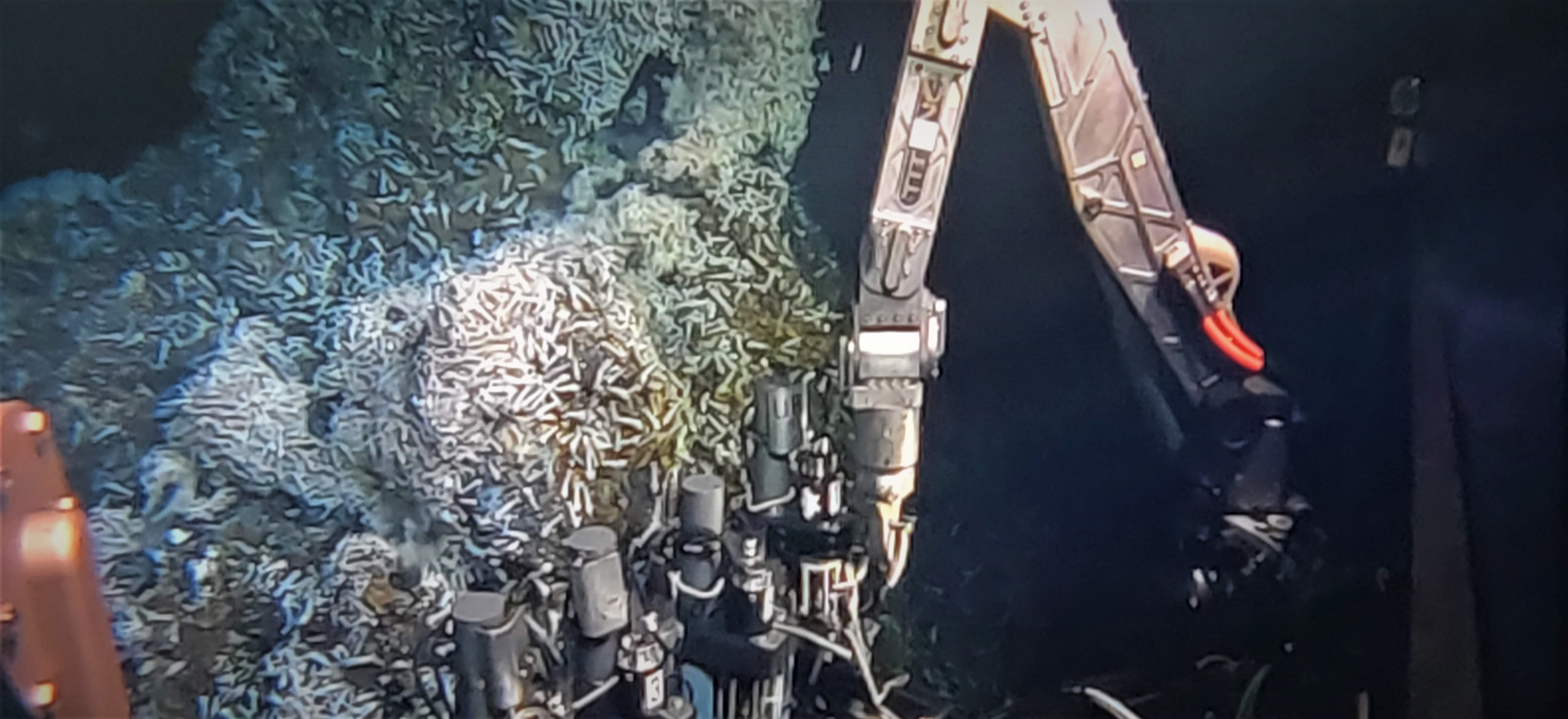
ROV Jason II working at the Von Damm Vent Field in 2020.

The Mid-Cayman Rise is a particularly unique location as there are two confirmed hydrothermal fields in close proximity of each other. The Von Damm vent field, named after geological oceanographer Karen Von Damm, is located on the ocean core complex Mount Dent, and features unique chimney structures of talc. The Beebe Vent field, after William Beebe, is the world's deepest hydrothermal system with extremely hot vent fluids. There is activity in the water column to suggest a third vent field, though it has not yet been identified.

We know hydrothermal vents appear along ridges approximately every 100 kilometers [62 miles]. But this ridge crest is only 100 kilometers long, so we should only have expected to find evidence for one site at most. So finding evidence for three sites was quite unexpected – but then finding out that our data indicated that each site represents a different style of venting – one of every kind known, all in pretty much the same place – was extraordinarily cool.

— Chris German, 2010, Astrobiology Magazine

The hydrothermal vents cause there to be high temperatures which extremophile organisms live in. These microorganisms have been named Candidatus Vondammii. They have been studied to understand how they are able to live in extreme conditions. The NASA Astrobiology Program is interested in studying this area as it is an extreme environment that simulates conditions on other planets where life could be found.
