= Abyssal zone =

Deep layer of the ocean between 4000 and 9000 meters

The abyssal zone or abyssopelagic zone is a layer of the pelagic zone of the ocean. The word abyss comes from the Greek word ἄβυσσος (Ancient Greek: ἄβυσσος, romanized: abyssos), meaning "bottomless". At depths of 4,000–6,000 m (13,000–20,000 ft), this zone remains in perpetual darkness. It extends across 83% of the total area of the ocean and 60% of Earth's surface. The abyssal zone has temperatures around 2–3 °C (36–37 °F) through the large majority of its mass. The water pressure can reach up to 76 MPa (750 atm; 11,000 psi).

As there is no light, photosynthesis cannot occur, and there are no plants producing molecular oxygen (O_{2}), which instead primarily comes from ice that had melted long ago from the polar regions. The water along the seafloor of this zone is largely devoid of molecular oxygen, resulting in a death trap for organisms unable to quickly return to the oxygen-enriched water above or to survive in the low-oxygen environment. This region also contains a much higher concentration of nutrient salts, like nitrogen, phosphorus, and silica, due to the large amount of dead organic material that drifts down from the ocean zones above and decomposes.

The region below the abyssal zone is the sparsely inhabited hadal zone. The region above is the bathyal zone.

== Trenches ==
Layers of the pelagic zone

The deep trenches or fissures that plunge down thousands of meters below the ocean floor (for example, the mid-oceanic trenches such as the Mariana Trench in the Pacific) are almost unexplored. Previously, only the bathyscaphe Trieste, the remote control submarine Kaikō and the Nereus have been able to descend to these depths. However, as of March 25, 2012 one vehicle, the Deepsea Challenger, had penetrated to a depth of 10,898 meters (35,756 ft).

== Ecosystem ==
The relative sparsity of primary producers means that the majority of organisms living in the abyssal zone depend on the marine snow that falls from oceanic layers above. The biomass of the abyssal zone actually increases near the seafloor as most of the decomposing material and decomposers rest on the seabed.

The composition of the abyssal plain depends on the depth of the sea floor. Above 4000 meters the seafloor usually consists of calcareous shells of foraminifera, zooplankton, and phytoplankton. At depths greater than 4000 meters shells dissolve, leaving behind a seafloor of brown clay and silica from dead zooplankton and phytoplankton. Chemosynthetic Bacteria support large and diverse communities near hydrothermal vents, filling a similar role in these ecosystems as plants do in the sunlit regions above.

Manganese nodules, which are found in some areas of the deep sea, have been proposed to produce oxygen by a team of researchers from the Scottish Society of Marine Sciences. They observed rising oxygen concentrations in some experiments with manganese nodules present. However, there are significant problems with the research, including that manganese nodules were not present in some of the experiments, and no other researchers have been able to replicate the result.

== Biological adaptations ==
Organisms that live at this depth have had to evolve to overcome challenges provided by the abyssal zone. Fish and invertebrates had to evolve to withstand the sheer cold and intense pressure found at this level. Not only did they have to find ways to hunt and survive in constant darkness, but they also had to thrive in an ecosystem that has less oxygen and biomass, energy sources and prey, than the upper zones. To survive in these conditions, many fish and other organisms developed a much slower metabolism, and require much less oxygen than those in upper zones. Many animals also move very slowly to conserve energy. Their reproduction rates are also very slow, to decrease competition and conserve energy. Animals here typically have flexible stomachs and mouths, so that when scarce prey are found they can consume as many as possible.

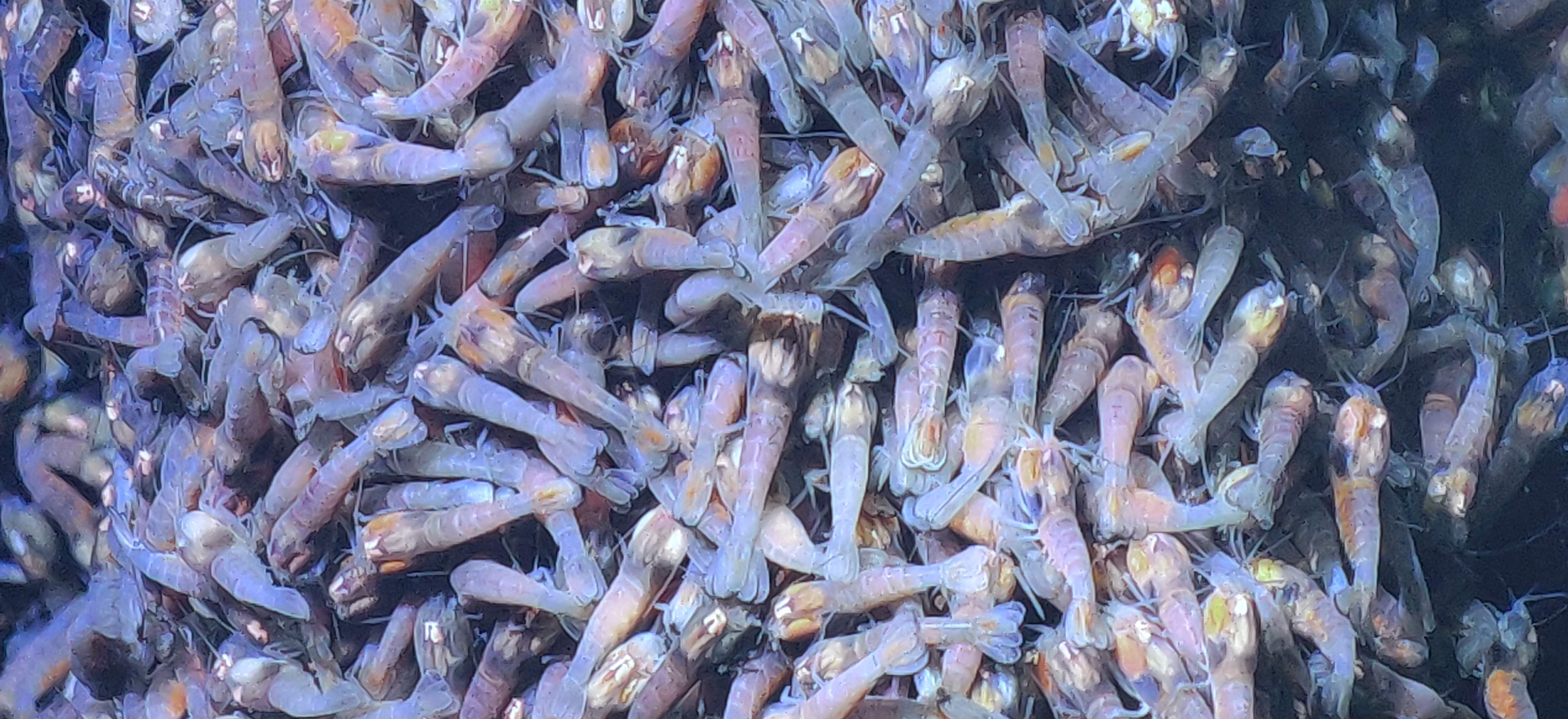
A dense gathering of Rimicaris hybisae shrimp at the Beebe Hydrothermal Vent Field in the Mid-Cayman Rise. The shrimp are almost entirely blind, surviving at the interface of cold, deep seawater and supercritical hydrothermal fluid.

Other challenges faced by life in the abyssal zone are the pressure and darkness caused by the zone's depth. Many organisms living in this zone have evolved to minimize internal air spaces, such as swim bladders. This adaptation helps to protect them from the extreme pressure, which can reach around 75 MPa (11,000 psi). The absence of light also spawned many different adaptations, such as having large eyes and the ability to produce their own light (bioluminescence). Large eyes would allow the detection and use of any light available, no matter how small. Commonly, animals in the abyssal zone are bioluminescent, producing blue light, because light in the blue wavelength range is attenuated over greater travel distances than other wavelengths. Due to this lack of light, complex patterns and bright colors are not needed. Most fish species have evolved to be transparent, red, or black so that they better blend in with the darkness and do not waste energy on developing and maintaining bright or complex patterns.

== Animals ==
The abyssal zone is made up of many different types of organisms, including microorganisms, crustaceans, molluscs (bivalves, snails, and cephalopods), different classes of fishes, and possibly some animals that have yet to be discovered. Most of the fish species in this zone are described as demersal or benthopelagic fishes. Demersal fish are fish whose habitats are on or near (typically less than five meters from) the seafloor. Most fish species fit into that classification, because the seafloor contains most of the abyssal zone's nutrients; therefore, the most complex food web or greatest biomass would be in this region of the zone.

Organisms in the abyssal zone rely on the natural processes of higher ocean layers. When animals from higher ocean levels die, their carcasses occasionally drift down to the abyssal zone, where organisms in the deep can feed on them. A whale carcass falling down to the abyssal zone is called a whale fall and can create complex ecosystems for organisms.

Organisms in the abyssal zone have evolved to cope with the cold and oxygen-depleted waters. Many have very slow metabolisms and have low oxygen consumption rates. Some, such as the deepsea lizardfish, are sit-and-wait predators, which are typically large and sedentary, waiting motionless on the seafloor for prey to pass by. There are also animals that spend their time in the upper portion of the abyssal zone, some of which even occasionally spend time in the zone directly above, the bathyal zone. While there are a number of different fish species representing many different groups and classes, like Actinopterygii (ray-finned fish), there are no known members of the class Chondrichthyes (animals such as sharks, rays, and chimaeras) that make the abyssal zone their primary or constant habitat. Whether this is due to the limited resources, energy availability, or other physiological constraints is unknown. Most Chondrichthyes species only go as deep as the bathyal zone.

Creatures that live in the abyssal zone include:

- Tripod fish (Bathypterois grallator): their habitat is along the ocean floor, usually around 4,720 m below sea level. Their pelvic fins and caudal fin have long bony rays protruding from them. They face the current while standing still on their long rays. Once they sense food nearby, they use their large pectoral fins to hit the unsuspecting prey towards their mouth. Each member of this species has both male and female reproductive organs so that if a mate cannot be found, they can self-fertilize.
- Dumbo octopus: this octopus usually lives at a depth between 1,000 and 7,000 meters, deeper than any other known octopus. They use the fins on top of their head, which look like flapping ears, to hover over the sea floor looking for food. They use their arms to help change directions or crawl along the seafloor. To combat the intense pressure of the abyssal zone, this octopus species lost its ink sac during evolution. They also use their strand-like structured suction cups to help detect predators, food, and other aspects of their environment.
- Cusk eel (genus Bassozetus): there are no known fish that live at depths greater than the cusk eel. The depth of the cusk eel habitat can be as great as 8,370 meters below sea level. This animal's ventral fins are specialized forked barbel-like organs that act as sensory organs. Cusk eels produce sounds to mate. Male cusk eels have two pairs of sonic muscles, while female cusk eels have three.
- Abyssal grenadier: this resident of the abyssal zone is known to live at depths ranging from 800 and 4,000 meters. It has extremely large eyes, but a small mouth. It is thought to be a semelparous species, meaning it only reproduces once and then dies. This is seen as a way for the organism to conserve energy and have a higher chance of having some healthy strong children. This reproductive strategy could be very useful in low energy environments such as the abyssal zone.
- Pseudoliparis swirei: the Mariana snailfish, or Mariana hadal snailfish, is a species of snailfish found at hadal depths in the Mariana Trench in the western Pacific Ocean. It is known from a depth range of 6,198–8,076 m (20,335–26,496 ft), including a capture at 7,966 m (26,135 ft), which is possibly the record for a fish caught on the seafloor.

== Environmental concerns ==
Climate change has had negative effects on the abyssal zone. Due to the zone's depth, increasing global temperatures do not affect it as quickly or drastically as the rest of the world, but the zone is still afflicted by ocean acidification. Pollutants, such as plastics, are also present in this zone. Plastics are especially bad for the abyssal zone because these organisms have evolved to eat or try to eat anything that moves or appears to be detritus, resulting in organisms consuming plastics instead of nutrients. Both ocean acidification and pollution are decreasing the already small biomass that resides within the abyssal zone.

Another problem caused by humans is overfishing. Even though no fishery can fish for organisms anywhere near the abyssal zone, they can still cause harm in deeper waters. The abyssal zone depends on dead organisms from the upper zones sinking to the seafloor, since the ecosystem lacks producers due to a lack of sunlight. As fish and other animals are removed from the ocean, the frequency and amount of dead material reaching the abyssal zone decreases.

Deep sea mining operations could cause problems for the abyssal zone in the future. The talks and planning for this industry are already under way. Deep sea mining could be disastrous for this extremely fragile ecosystem since there are many ecological dangers posed by mining for deep sea minerals. Mining could increase the amount of pollution not only in the abyssal zone, but in the ocean as a whole, and would physically destroy habitats and the seafloor.

Sediment plumes generated by mining activities can spread widely, affecting filter feeders and smothering marine life. The potential release of toxic chemicals and heavy metals from mining equipment and disturbed seabed materials could lead to chemical pollution, while noise from machinery can disrupt the behavior and communication of marine animals. Physical disturbances to the seabed may destroy geological features and their associated ecosystems. Furthermore, changes in water quality and the disruption of carbon sequestration processes, where organic carbon is stored in the deep sea, could have broader environmental impacts, including contributing to climate change. The slow rate of change in deep-sea environments and the long lifespans and reproductive cycles of abyssal species mean that recovery from such disturbances could take decades or centuries.

== See also ==
- Abyssal plain
- Beebe Hydrothermal Vent Field
- Deep sea
- Deep sea community
- Deep-sea fish
- Mariana Trench
