= Plantain Garden River =

Coordinates: 17°57′N 76°13′W

Location
- Country: Jamaica

The Plantain Garden River is a river in the parish of St Thomas on the island of Jamaica. It is the only major river in Jamaica that does not flow in a northerly or southerly direction.

== See also ==
- List of rivers of Jamaica
- Enriquillo–Plantain Garden fault zone
