= Swan Islands Transform Fault =

The Swan Islands Transform Fault is an active left-lateral (sinistral) strike-slip fault zone that forms part of the boundary between the Caribbean plate and the North American plate. It runs along the southern boundary of the Cayman Trough from the Mid-Cayman Rise spreading center in the east, to Guatemala in the west, where it continues as the Motagua Fault. It consists of two main fault strands that overlap west of the Swan Islands. It has been associated with several major earthquakes, including those in 2009, 2018 and 2025.
