= Cayman Trough =

Transform fault zone pull-apart basin on the floor of the Caribbean Sea

Coordinates: 18°30′N 83°0′W

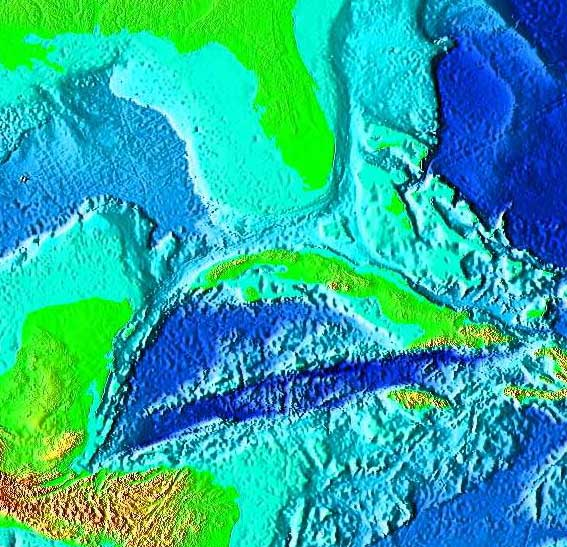
False-color image of the Cayman Trough, created from digital databases of seafloor and land elevations.

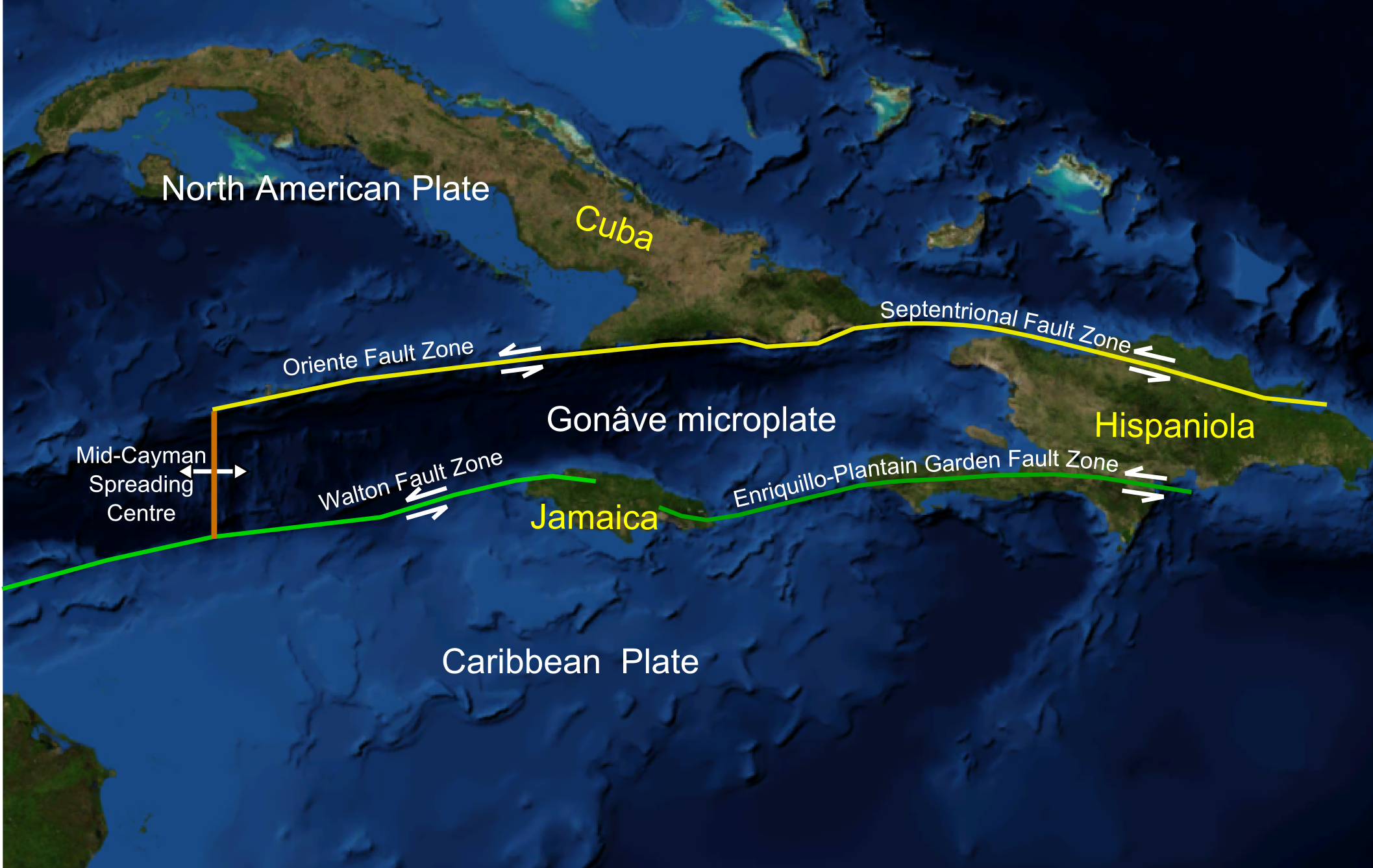
Mid-Cayman spreading centre as part of the trough, on the western edge of the Gonâve Microplate.

The Cayman Trough (also known as the Cayman Trench, Bartlett Deep and Bartlett Trough) is a complex transform fault zone pull-apart basin on the floor of the western Caribbean Sea between Jamaica and the Cayman Islands. It is the deepest point in the Caribbean Sea and forms part of the tectonic boundary between the North American Plate and the Caribbean Plate. It extends from the Windward Passage, going south of the Sierra Maestra of Cuba toward Guatemala. It is bisected by the Mid-Cayman Rise, a small mid-ocean ridge and divergent plate boundary running south from Grand Cayman Island. The transform fault continues onshore as the Polochic-Motagua fault system, which consists of the Polochic and Motagua faults. This system continues on until the Chiapas massif where it is part of the diffuse triple junction of the North American, Caribbean and Cocos plates.

The relatively narrow trough trends east-northeast to west-southwest and has a maximum depth of 7,686 metres (25,217 ft). Within the trough is a slowly spreading north–south ridge which may be the result of an offset or gap of approximately 420 kilometres (260 mi) along the main fault trace. The Cayman spreading ridge shows a long-term opening rate of 11–12 mm/yr. The eastern section of the trough has been named the Gonâve Microplate. The Gonâve plate extends from the spreading ridge east to the island of Hispaniola. It is bounded on the north by the Oriente and Septentrional fault zones. On the south the Gonâve is bounded by the Walton fault zone, the Jamaica restraining bend and the Enriquillo-Plantain Garden fault zone. The two bounding strike slip fault zones are left lateral. The motion relative to the North American Plate is 11 mm/yr to the east and the motion relative to the Caribbean Plate is 8 mm/yr. The western section of the trough is bounded to its south by the Swan Islands Transform Fault.

During the Eocene the trough was the site of a subduction zone which formed the volcanic arc of the Cayman Ridge and the Sierra Maestra volcanic terrain of Cuba to the north, as the northeastward-moving Caribbean Plate was subducted beneath the southwest-moving North American Plate, or as some researchers contend, beneath a plate fragment dubbed the East Cuban Microplate.

In 2010 a UK team from the National Oceanography Centre in Southampton (NOCS), equipped with an autonomously controlled robot submarine, began mapping the full extent of the trench and discovered black smokers on the ocean floor at a depth of 5 km (16,000 ft), the deepest yet found. In January 2012, the researchers announced that water exits the vents at a temperature possibly exceeding 450 °C (842 °F), making them among the hottest known undersea vents. They also announced the discovery of new species, including an eyeless shrimp with a light-sensing organ on its back.

== See also ==
- Oceanic trench
