= Walton fault zone =

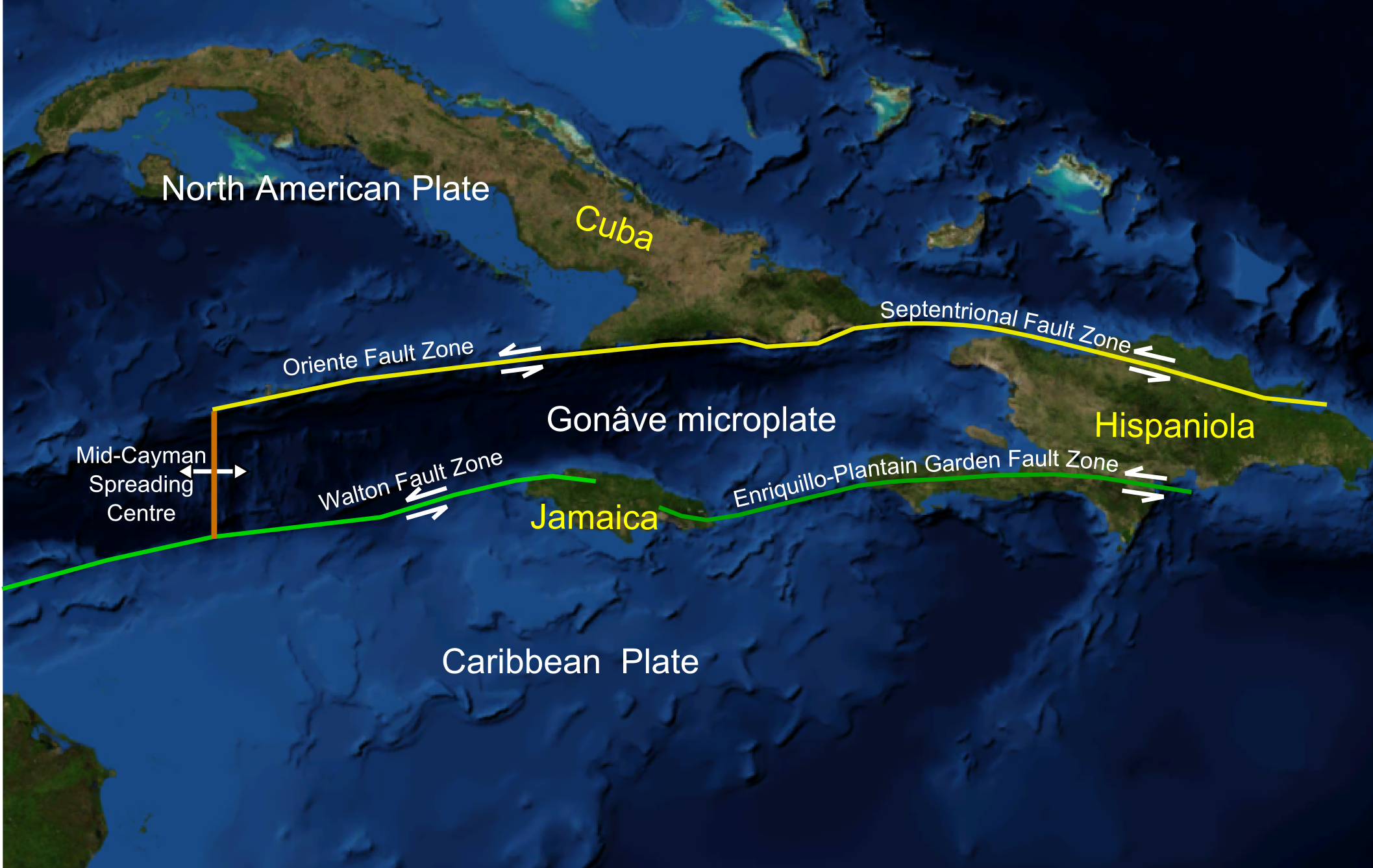
The Gonâve Microplate, showing the location of the Walton fault zone

The Walton fault zone is a major active left lateral (sinistral) strike-slip fault, forming part of the southern boundary to the Cayman Trough. It extends from the Mid-Cayman Rise spreading center in the west to Jamaica in the east. It has a total length of about 360 km and is formed of several sub-parallel strands. Together with the Enriquillo-Plantain Garden fault zone it forms the southern boundary of the Gonâve Microplate. It is associated with only moderate earthquakes with magnitudes of less than 6.
