= Caribbean plate =

Tectonic plate in Central America and the Caribbean

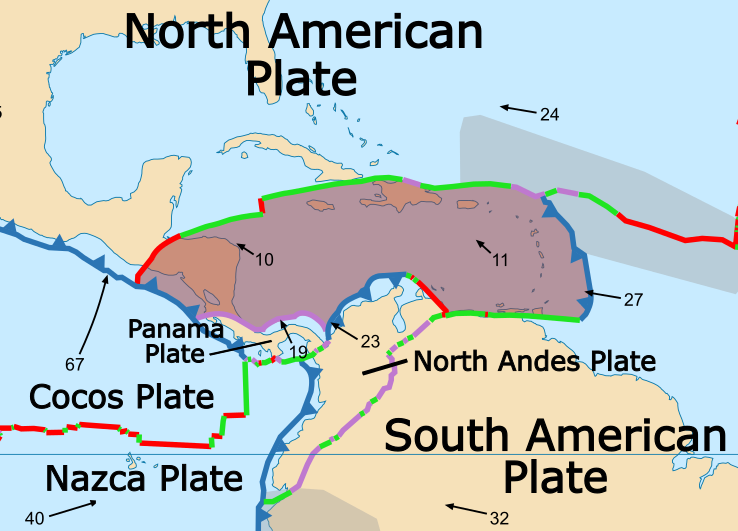
- Type: Minor
- Approximate area: 3,300,000 km^{2} (1,300,000 sq mi)
- Movement^{1}: north-west
- Speed^{1}: 10-11mm/year
- Features: Central America, Greater Antilles, Lesser Antilles Caribbean Sea
- ^{1}Relative to the African plate

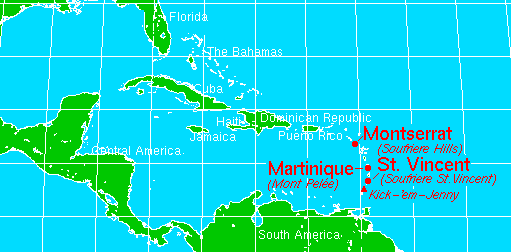
Volcanoes of the Caribbean

The Caribbean plate, also known as Circum-Caribbean tectonic plate is a mostly oceanic tectonic plate underlying Central America and the Caribbean Sea off the northern coast of South America.

Roughly 3.2 million square kilometres (1.2 million square miles) in area, the Caribbean plate borders the North American plate, the South American plate, the Nazca plate and the Cocos plate. These borders are regions of intense seismic activity, including frequent earthquakes, occasional tsunamis, and volcanic eruptions.

== Boundary types ==
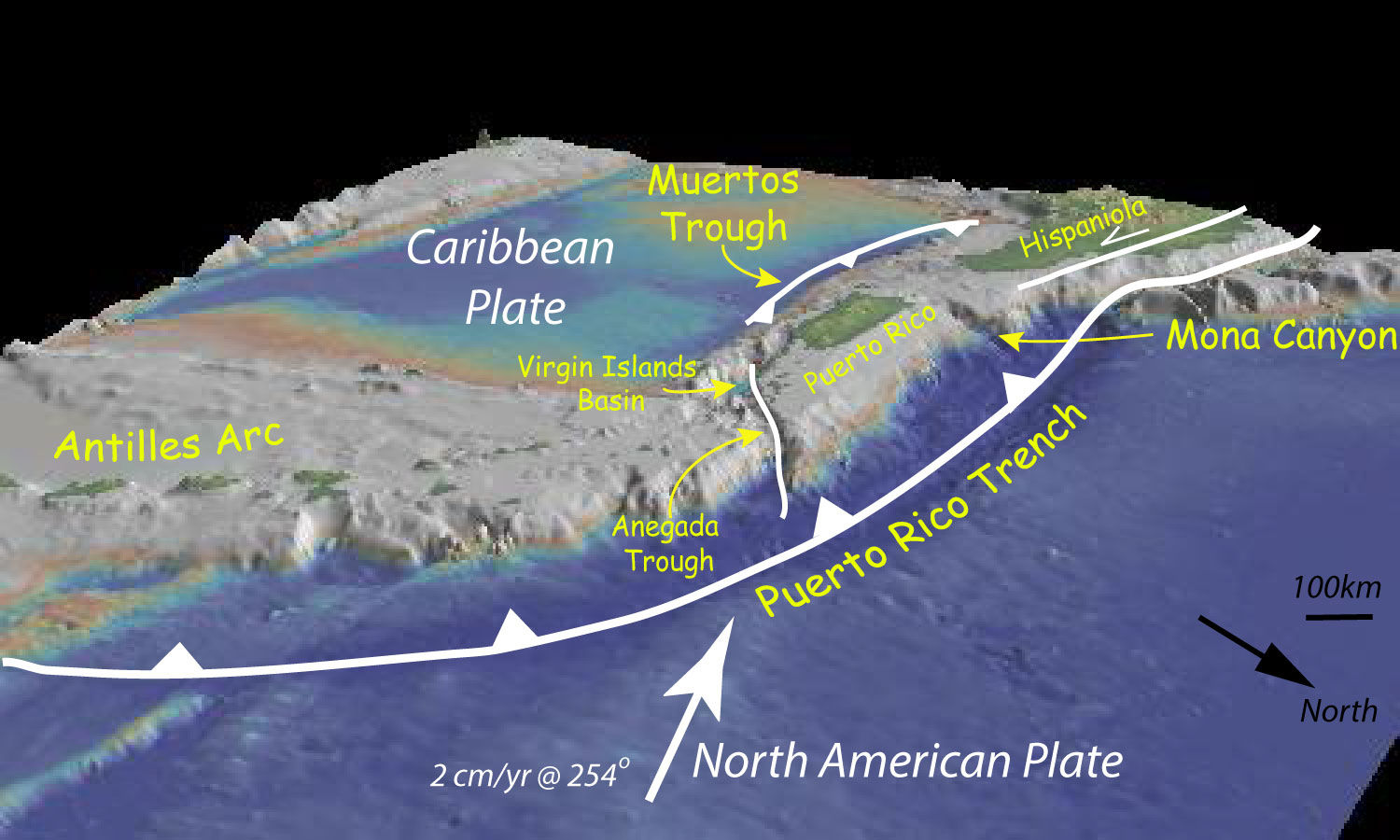
Bathymetry of the northeast corner of the Caribbean plate showing the major faults and plate boundaries; view looking south-west. The main bathymetric features of this area include: the Lesser Antilles Volcanic Arc; the old inactive volcanic arc of the Greater Antilles (Virgin Islands, Puerto Rico, and Hispaniola); the Muertos Trough; and the Puerto Rico Trench formed at the plate boundary zone between the Caribbean and obliquely subducting North American plates. Vertical exaggeration is 5:1.

The northern boundary with the North American plate is a transform or strike-slip boundary that runs from the border area of Belize, Guatemala (Motagua Fault), and Honduras in Central America, eastward through the Cayman trough along the Swan Islands Transform Fault before joining the southern boundary of the Gonâve microplate. East of the Mid-Cayman Rise this continues as the Walton fault zone and the Enriquillo–Plantain Garden fault zone into eastern Hispaniola. From there it continues into Puerto Rico, and the Virgin Islands. Part of the Puerto Rico Trench, the deepest part of the Atlantic Ocean (roughly 8,400 metres or 27,600 feet), lies along this border. The Puerto Rico Trench is at a complex transition from the subduction boundary to the south and the transform boundary to the west.

The eastern boundary is a subduction zone, the Lesser Antilles subduction zone, where oceanic crust of the South American plate is being subducted under the Caribbean plate. Subduction forms the volcanic islands of the Lesser Antilles Volcanic Arc from the Virgin Islands in the north to the islands off the coast of Venezuela in the south. This boundary contains seventeen active volcanoes, most notably Soufriere Hills on Montserrat; Mount Pelée on Martinique; La Grande Soufrière on Guadeloupe; Soufrière Saint Vincent on Saint Vincent; and the submarine volcano Kick 'em Jenny which lies about 10 km north of Grenada. Large historical earthquakes in 1839 and 1843 in this region are possibly megathrust earthquakes.

Along the geologically complex southern boundary, the Caribbean plate interacts with the South American plate forming Barbados, Trinidad and Tobago (all on the Caribbean plate), and islands off the coast of Venezuela (including the Leeward Antilles) and Colombia. This boundary is in part the result of transform faulting, along with thrust faulting and some subduction. The rich Venezuelan petroleum fields possibly result from this complex plate interaction. The Caribbean plate is moving eastward about 22 millimetres (0.87 in) per year in relation to the South American plate. In Venezuela, much of the movement between the Caribbean plate and the South American plate occurs along the faults of Boconó, El Pilar, and San Sebastián.

The western portion of the plate is occupied by Central America. The Cocos plate in the Pacific Ocean is subducted beneath the Caribbean plate, just off the western coast of Central America. This subduction forms the volcanoes of Guatemala, El Salvador, Nicaragua, and Costa Rica, also known as the Central America Volcanic Arc.

== Origin ==
The usual theory of the origin of the Caribbean plate was confronted by a contrasting theory in 2002.

The mainstream theory holds that it is the Caribbean large igneous province (CLIP) which formed in the Pacific Ocean tens of millions of years ago, perhaps originating at the Galápagos hotspot. As the Atlantic Ocean widened, North America and South America were pushed westward, separated for a time by oceanic crust. The Pacific Ocean floor subducted under this oceanic crust between the continents. The CLIP drifted into the same area, but as it was less dense and thicker than the surrounding oceanic crust, it did not subduct, but rather overrode the ocean floor, continuing to move eastward relative to North America and South America. With the formation of the Isthmus of Panama 3 million years ago, it ultimately lost its connection to the Pacific.

The more recent theory asserts that the Caribbean plate came into being from an Atlantic hotspot which no longer exists. This theory points to evidence of the absolute motion of the Caribbean plate which indicates that it moves westward, not east, and that its apparent eastward motion is only relative to the motions of the North American plate and the South American plate.

== First American land bridge ==
The Caribbean plate began its eastward migration 80 million years ago (Ma) during the Late Cretaceous. This migration eventually resulted in a volcanic arc stretching from northwestern South America to the Yucatán Peninsula, today represented by the Aves Islands and the Lesser and Greater Antilles. This arc was the subject of constant tectonism and sea-level fluctuation, but lasted until the mid-Eocene and intermittently formed a land bridge along the eastern and northern boundaries of the Caribbean plate. What would eventually become present-day Central America, part of the western plate boundary, was still isolated in the Pacific.

58.5 to 56.5 Ma, during the Late Paleocene, a local sea-level low-stand assisted by the continental uplift of the western margin of South America, resulted in a fully operative land bridge over which several groups of mammals apparently took part in an interchange. For example, specimens have been assigned to xenarthra, didelphidae, and phorusrhacidae from Eocene North America and Europe (although these have been criticized), and Peradectes from Paleocene South America.

== Great American Interchange ==
The Great American Interchange in which land and freshwater fauna migrated between North America and South America via the uplifted western margin of the Caribbean plate (Central America) was a later event, which peaked dramatically around 2.6 million years (Ma) ago during the Piacenzian age.

== See also ==
- 2010 Haiti earthquake
- Central America Volcanic Arc
- Gonâve microplate
- List of earthquakes in Guatemala
- List of earthquakes in Puerto Rico
- List of tectonic plates
- Panama plate
