= Enriquillo–Plantain Garden fault zone =

Seismic fault in the Caribbean

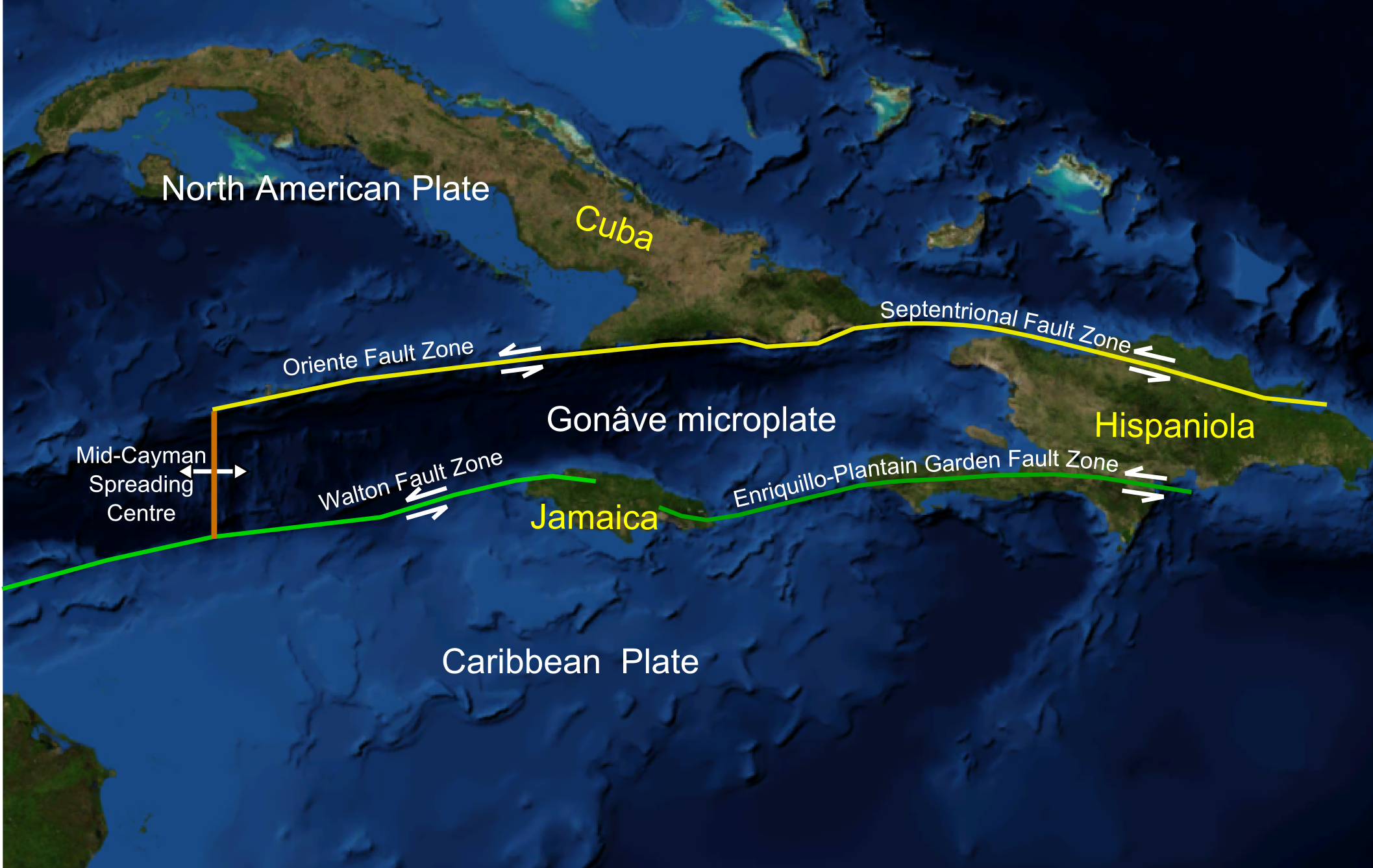
Gonâve microplate showing main fault zones

The Enriquillo–Plantain Garden fault zone (EPGFZ or EPGZ) is a system of active coaxial left lateral-moving strike slip faults which runs along the southern side of the island of Hispaniola, where Haiti and the Dominican Republic are located. The EPGFZ is named for Lake Enriquillo in the Dominican Republic where the fault zone emerges, and extends across the southern portion of Hispaniola through the Caribbean to the region of the Plantain Garden River in Jamaica.

== Geology ==
The EPGFZ shares approximately half of the relative motion between the North American and Caribbean tectonic plates with the Septentrional-Oriente fault zone which runs along the northern side of Hispaniola. Both faults merge into the Cayman Trench to the west. The fault accommodates about 20.6±1.66 millimeters of lateral motion per year (mm/yr). Additionally, a component of compression is present as the North American plate pushes toward the southwest. This results in vertical deformation manifest in the mountainous terrain of Hispaniola. Some researchers believe that the EPGFZ and the Septentrional-Orient fault zone bound a microplate, dubbed the Gonâve microplate, a 190,000 km^{2} (73,000 sq mi) area of the northern Caribbean plate that is in the process of shearing off the Caribbean plate and accreting to the North America plate.

== Earthquakes ==
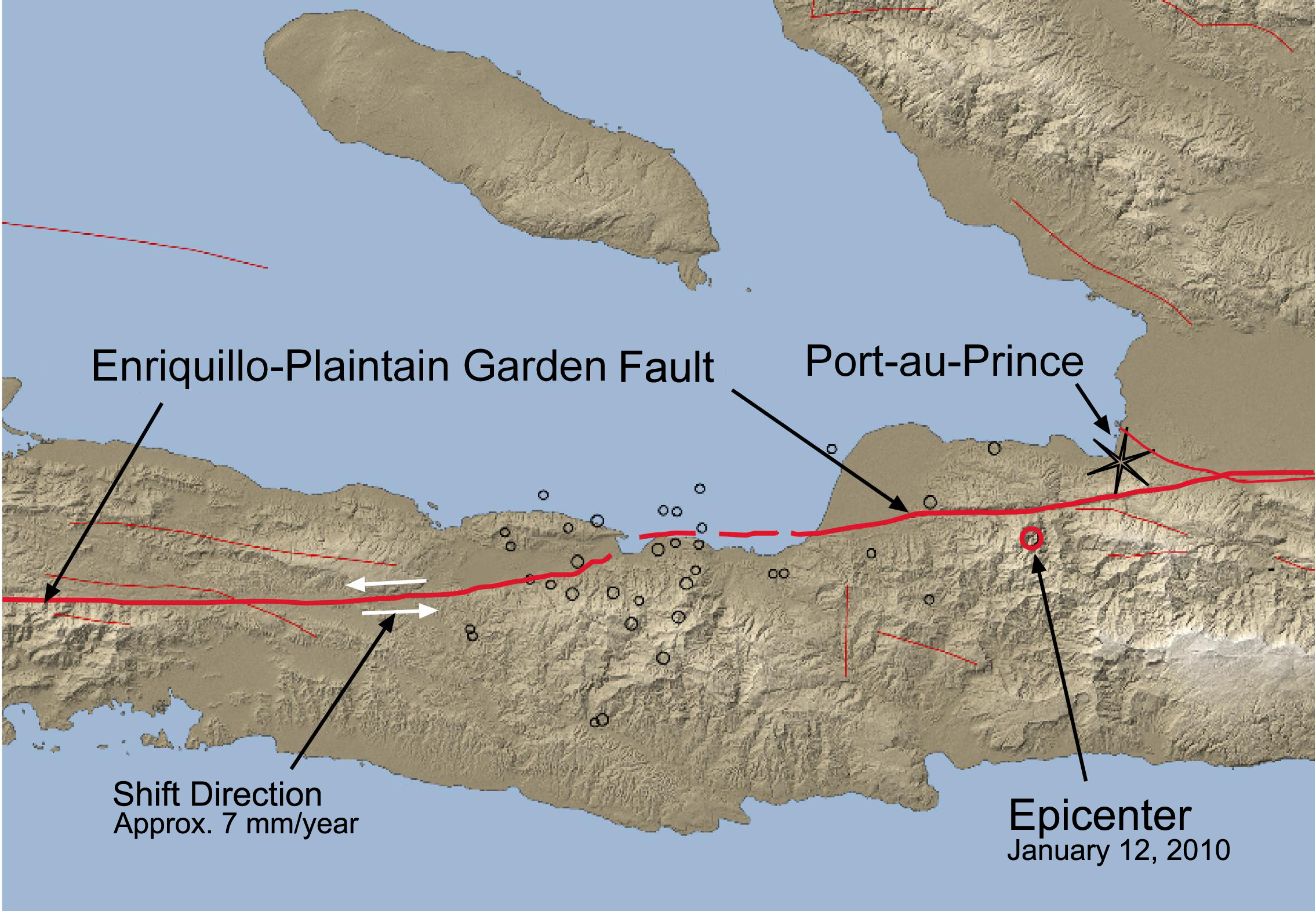
Fault system in the vicinity of the 12 January 2010 quake; epicenter is the red circle.

- A magnitude 7.5 earthquake struck southeastern coast of Jamaica in 1692, almost destroying Port Royal
- An earthquake struck along the southern coast of Hispaniola in 1751.
- A magnitude 7.5 earthquake struck the Haitian capital Port-au-Prince in 1770.
- The 1907 Kingston earthquake damaged every building in Kingston, Jamaica.
- The 2010 magnitude 7.0 earthquake occurred near Port-au-Prince along blind thrust faults associated with this fault zone. It was the worst earthquake this fault has ever produced, causing a very high number of casualties and destroying the country's infrastructure.
- The 2021 Haiti earthquake (magnitude 7.2) struck Haiti's Tiburon Peninsula.

Other historical large earthquakes in 1860, 1761, 1684, 1673, and 1618 are also likely attributed to the EPGFZ, though none of these have been confirmed in the field as associated with this fault.

=== Monitoring ===
A temporary Canadian seismic sensor network of three stations has been established in Haiti along the fault, as of February 19, 2010. The network is not considered permanent, but will remain for quite some time. The stations are in secure locations, being expensive equipment, and are satellite linked to Natural Resources Canada in Ottawa. They are solar powered, so do not require grid connections. One station is at the Canadian Embassy in Port-au-Prince (in the suburb of Pétion-Ville, in the district of Juvénat), and has a permanent guard of one. Another is at the Jacmel Airport, currently run by Canadian Forces personnel. The third is at a Léogâne orphanage, considered secure, but there are problems discouraging children from playing with it. The stations are roughly 50 km apart. These are the first seismic stations ever in the country.
