= North American plate =

Large tectonic plate including most of North America, Greenland and part of Siberia

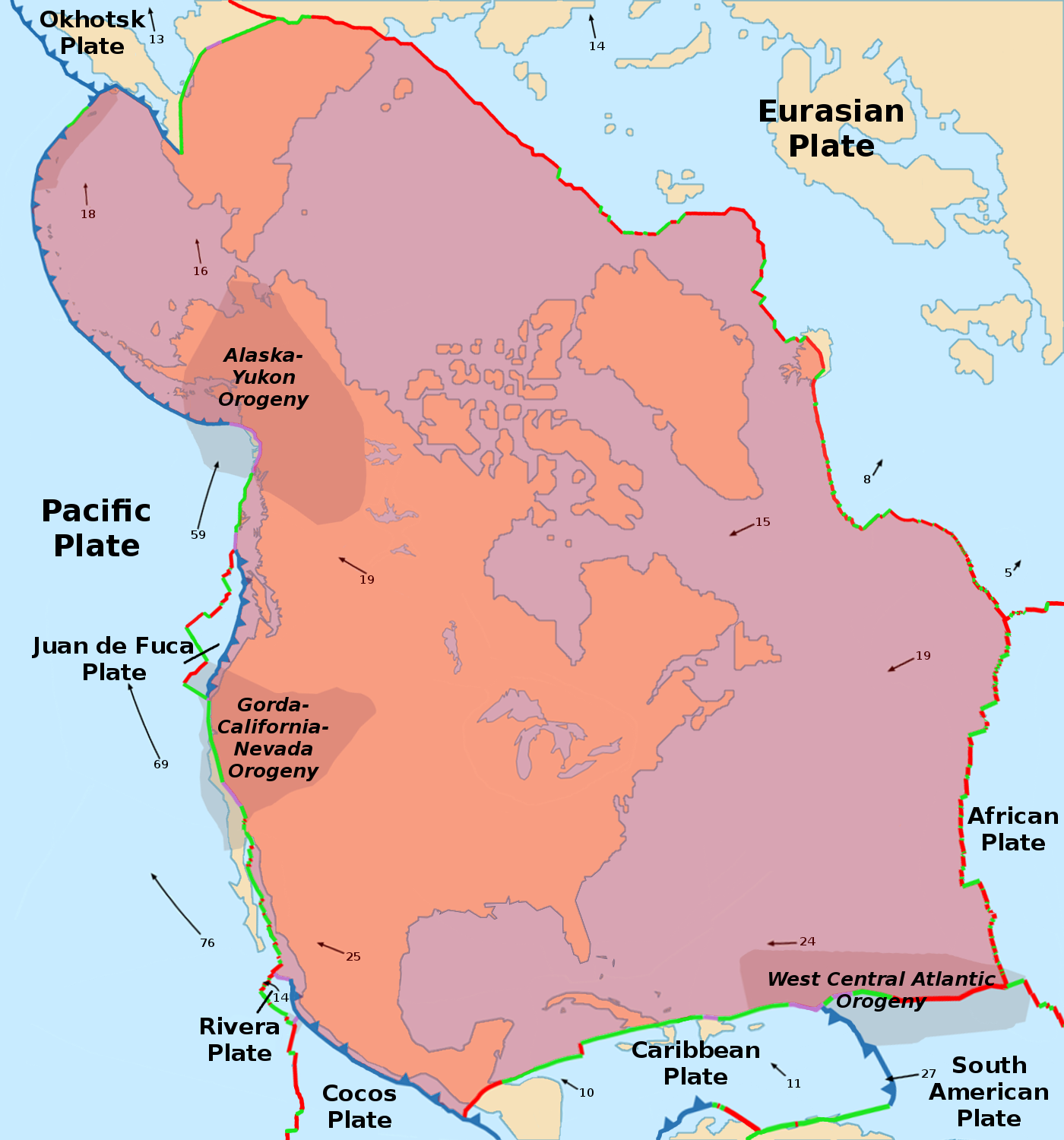
- Type: Major
- Approximate area: 75,900,000 km^{2} (29,300,000 sq mi)
- Movement^{1}: west
- Speed^{1}: 15–25 mm (0.59–0.98 in)/year
- Features: North America, Atlantic Ocean, northern Caribbean, Arctic Ocean, Gulf of Alaska, (part of, also on Eurasian Plate), Russian Far East (i.e. part of Siberia), Northern Japan, Azores (part of), Iceland (part of, also on Eurasian plate)
- ^{1}Relative to the African plate

The North American plate is a tectonic plate containing most of North America, Cuba, the Bahamas, extreme northeastern Asia, and parts of Iceland and the Azores. With an area of 76 million km^{2} (29 million sq mi), it is the Earth's second largest tectonic plate, behind the Pacific plate (which borders the plate to the west).

It extends eastward to the seismically active Mid-Atlantic Ridge at the Azores triple junction plate boundary where it meets the Eurasian plate and Nubian plate. and westward to the Chersky Range in eastern Siberia. The plate includes both continental and oceanic crust. The interior of the main continental landmass includes an extensive granitic core called a craton. Along most of the edges of this craton are fragments of crustal material called terranes, which are accreted to the craton by tectonic actions over a long span of time. Much of North America west of the Rocky Mountains is composed of such terranes.

== Boundaries ==
The southern boundary with the Cocos plate to the west and the Caribbean plate to the east is a transform fault, represented by the Swan Islands Transform Fault under the Caribbean Sea and the Motagua Fault through Guatemala. The parallel Septentrional and Enriquillo–Plantain Garden faults running through Hispaniola and bounding the Gonâve microplate, and the parallel Puerto Rico Trench running north of Puerto Rico and the Virgin Islands and bounding the Puerto Rico–Virgin Islands microplate, are also a part of the boundary. The rest of the southerly margin which extends east to the Mid-Atlantic Ridge and marks the boundary between the North American plate and the South American plate is vague but located near the Fifteen-Twenty fracture zone around 16°N.

On the northerly boundary is a continuation of the Mid-Atlantic Ridge called the Gakkel Ridge. The rest of the boundary in the far northwestern part of the plate extends into Siberia and Northern Japan. This boundary continues from the end of the Gakkel Ridge as the Laptev Sea Rift, on to a transitional deformation zone in the Chersky Range, then the Ulakhan Fault between it and the Okhotsk microplate, and finally the Aleutian Trench to the end of the Queen Charlotte Fault system (see also: Aleutian Arc).

The westerly boundary is the Queen Charlotte Fault running offshore along the coast of Alaska and the Cascadia subduction zone to the north, the San Andreas Fault through California, the East Pacific Rise in the Gulf of California, and the Middle America Trench to the south.

On its western edge, the Farallon plate has been subducting under the North American plate since the Jurassic period. The Farallon plate has almost completely subducted beneath the western portion of the North American plate, leaving that part of the North American plate in contact with the Pacific plate as the San Andreas Fault. The Juan de Fuca, Explorer, Gorda, Rivera, Cocos and Nazca plates are remnants of the Farallon plate. The boundary along the Gulf of California is complex. The gulf is underlain by the Gulf of California Rift Zone, a series of rift basins and transform fault segments from the northern end of the East Pacific Rise in the mouth of the gulf to the San Andreas Fault system in the vicinity of the Salton Trough rift/Brawley seismic zone. It is generally accepted that a piece of the North American plate was broken off and transported north as the East Pacific Rise propagated northward, creating the Gulf of California. However, it is as yet unclear whether the oceanic crust between the rise and the mainland coast of Mexico is actually a new plate beginning to converge with the North American plate, consistent with the standard model of rift zone spreading centers generally.

Two major islands of the Azores, Flores and Corvo, lie on the eastern edge of the North American plate, just west of the Mid-Atlantic Ridge and near the Azores triple junction. The other major islands of the Azores lie on the African or Eurasian plates.

== Hotspots ==
A few hotspots are thought to exist below the North American plate. The most notable hotspots are the Yellowstone (Wyoming), Jemez Lineament (New Mexico), and Anahim (British Columbia) hotspots. These are thought to be caused by a narrow stream of hot mantle convecting up from the Earth's core–mantle boundary called a mantle plume, although some geologists think that upper mantle convection is a more likely cause. The Yellowstone and Anahim hotspots are thought to have first arrived during the Miocene period and are still geologically active, creating earthquakes and volcanoes. The Yellowstone hotspot is most notable for the Yellowstone Caldera and the many calderas that lie in the Snake River Plain, while the Anahim hotspot is most notable for the Anahim Volcanic Belt in the Nazko Cone area.

== Plate motion ==
For the most part, the North American plate moves in roughly a southwest direction away from the Mid-Atlantic Ridge at a rate of about 2.3 centimeters (~1 inch) per year. At the same time, the Pacific plate is moving to the northwest at a speed of between 7 and 11 centimeters (~3-4 inches) per year. The motion of the plate cannot be driven by subduction as no part of the North American plate is being subducted, except for a small section comprising part of the Puerto Rico Trench; thus other mechanisms continue to be investigated. One study in 2007 suggests that a mantle convective current is propelling the plate.

== See also ==
- Geologic timeline of Western North America
- New Madrid seismic zone, an ancient intraplate fault zone within the North American plate, notable as early as 1699
