= Gonâve microplate =

Part of the boundary between the North American plate and the Caribbean plate

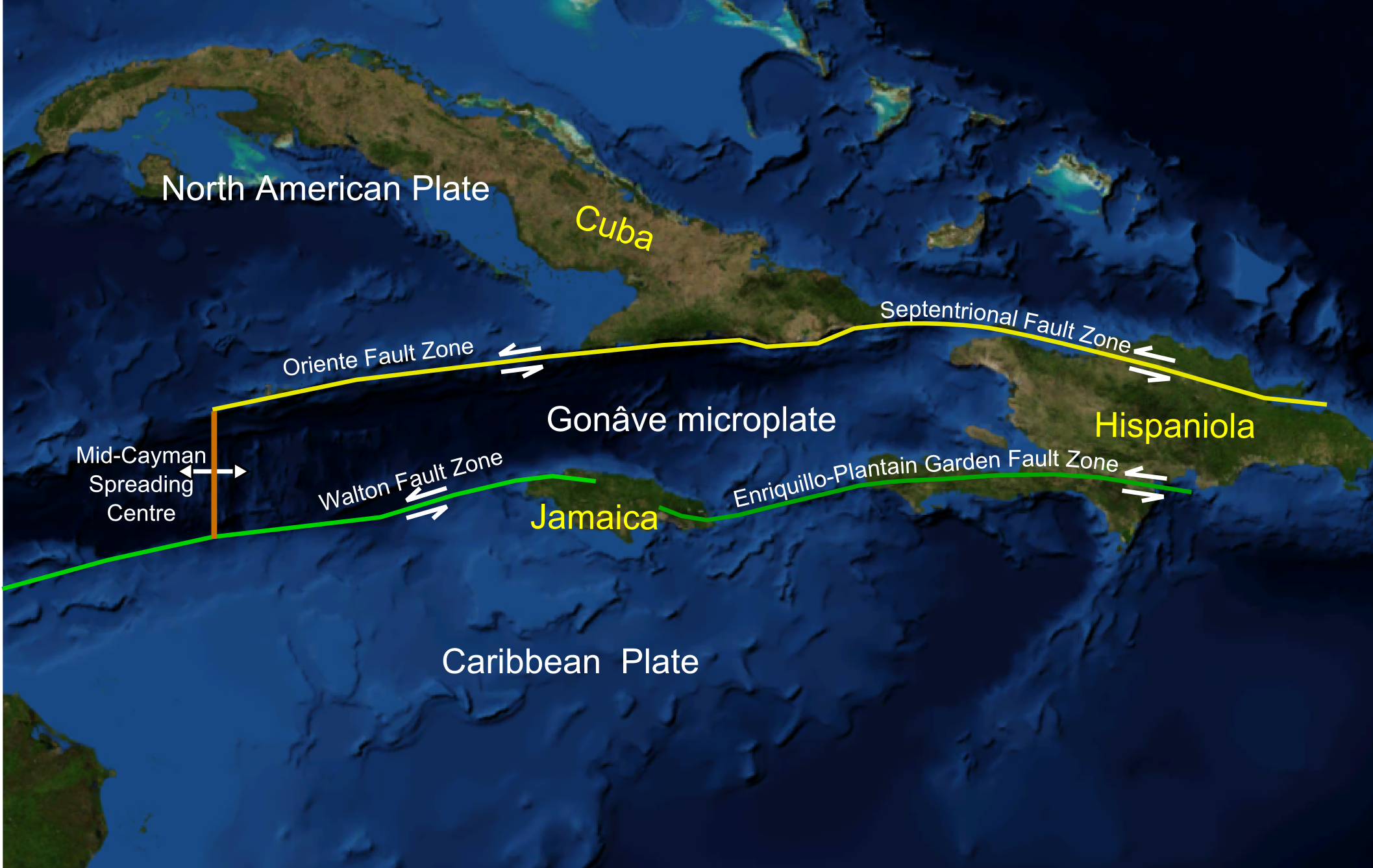
The Gonâve microplate, showing the fault zones that bound it

The Gonâve microplate forms part of the boundary between the North American plate and the Caribbean plate. It is bounded to the west by the Mid-Cayman Rise spreading center, to the north by the Septentrional-Oriente fault zone and to the south by the Walton fault zone and the Enriquillo–Plantain Garden fault zone. The existence of this microplate was first proposed in 1991. This has been confirmed by GPS measurements, which show that the overall displacement between the two main plates is split almost equally between the transform fault zones that bound the Gonâve microplate. The microplate is expected to eventually become accreted to the North American plate.

== Geographic extent ==
The Gonâve microplate is an approximately 1,100 km long strip, consisting mainly of oceanic crust of the Cayman Trough but including island arc material at its eastern end on the western part of Hispaniola. Further east a separate Hispaniola Microplate has been identified. At its western end, the Gonâve microplate is bounded by the mid-Cayman spreading centre. To the north it is bounded by the Septentrional-Oriente fault zone and to the south by a more complex strike-slip fault system that includes the Walton fault and the Enriquillo-Plantain Garden fault zone. As the northern and southern boundaries approach the eastern edge of the Caribbean plate they become less distinct and the eastern boundary is not as well defined.

== Evidence for existence ==
The presence of a separate Gonâve microplate was first suggested by the analysis of sidescan sonar results from the Cayman Trough. This study found evidence for continuous transform type faults along the southern flank of the trough, to both sides of the spreading centre. GPS data supports the existence of the microplate by showing that the relative motion between the North American and Caribbean plates is split almost equally between the two bounding transform fault systems. Comparison of these rates with observations of magnetic stripes within the Cayman Trough suggests that displacement is increasingly being transferred from the northern fault system to the southern one. This observation is consistent with the eventual accretion of the Gonâve microplate to the North American plate.

== History ==
The Gonâve microplate began to form in the Early Eocene after the northern part of the leading edge of the Caribbean plate (present day Cuba) collided with the Bahamas platform. This part of the plate was unable to move further to the east and a transform fault system developed to the south, effectively cutting off this northern area and accreting it to the North American plate. A large left-stepping offset formed along this zone just east of the Yucatán peninsula creating a pull-apart basin, which continued to extend until the onset of seafloor spreading, creating the Cayman spreading centre. Further movement on this fault system created the Cayman Trough, although at that time the future microplate was still firmly attached to the Caribbean plate. During the Late Miocene, the part of the Caribbean plate formed by Hispaniola began to collide with the Bahamas platform and a new strike-slip fault system developed through Jamaica and southern Hispaniola, the Enriquillo–Plantain Garden fault zone, isolating part of the Cayman Trough and the central part of Hispaniola to form the Gonâve microplate. It has been suggested that the Gonave microplate will also become accreted to the North American plate, as all the plate boundary displacement transfers onto the southern fault system.
