= List of earthquakes in the Caribbean =

The Caribbean Basin is located in a complex tectonic setting, shaped by the interactions of the Caribbean Plate with surrounding plates, featuring distinct zones of deformation: in the west, bordered by major transform faults such as the Oriente and Swan faults near Cuba and the Cayman Islands; in the center, marked by the Septentrional Fault and the Puerto Rico Trench, where oblique convergence and subduction occur; and in the east, defined by the active Lesser Antilles subduction zone, where the Atlantic oceanic crust descends beneath the Caribbean arc, generating intense seismic and volcanic activity.

The following is a list of major or notable earthquakes that have directly affected the Caribbean region; it includes earthquakes measuring at least 6.5 magnitude or earthquakes which have directly caused life loss, injuries or significant damage to the region.

== Earthquakes ==
Date	Region	Mag.	MMI	Deaths	Injuries	Comments	Source
2026-06-08	Cuba	6.1 M_{w}	V	–	–	–	
2024-11-10	Cuba	6.8 M_{w}	VIII	–	10		
2022-03-23	Haiti	5.1 M_{w}	VIII	–	5	Some damage	
2021-08-14	Haiti	7.2 M_{w}	VIII	2,248	12,763	Severe damage	
2020-01-28	Jamaica, Cuba, Cayman Islands	7.7 M_{w}	VI	–	–	0.3–1 meter tsunami	
2020-01-07	Puerto Rico	6.4 M_{w}	VIII	4	9	Strongest earthquake in a 2+ year sequence	
2018-10-07	Haiti	5.9 M_{w}	VI	18	548		
2018-08-21	Venezuela, Trinidad	7.3 M_{w}	VII	5	122		
2017-09-02	Haiti	4.3 M_{w}	IV	–	1	Some damage	
2010-01-12	Haiti	7.0 M_{w}	X	100,000–316,000	–	Extreme damage and minor damaging tsunami	
2007-11-29	Martinique	7.4 M_{w}	VI–VII	6	402		
2004-12-14	Cayman Islands	6.8 M_{w}	VI	–	–		
2004-11-21	Guadeloupe, Dominica	6.3 M_{w}	VII	1	13	Non-destructive tsunami	
2003-09-22	Dominican Republic	6.4 M_{w}	VII	3	–	Dozens of injuries	
1997-04-22	Trinidad and Tobago	6.7 M_{w}	VII	–	2	Damage	
1994-03-02	Haiti	5.4 M_{w}	V	4	–	Damage	
1993-01-13	Jamaica	5.5 M_{w}	VI	1	–	Some damage	
1992-05-25	Cuba	6.8 M_{w}	VI	–	40		
1985-03-16	Saint Kitts & Nevis	6.5 M_{w}	VI	–	–		
1984-06-24	Dominican Republic	6.7 M_{w}	VII	5	–	Limited damage / tsunami	
1974-10-08	Antigua & Barbuda	6.9 M_{w}	VIII	–	4		
1971-06-11	Dominican Republic	6.5 M_{w}	V	–	51		
1969-12-25	Guadeloupe	7.2 M_{w}	IV	–	–		
1962-04-20	Haiti	6.6 M_{w}	VI	–	–		
1953-05-31	Dominican Republic	6.6 M_{w}	VII	–	–	Some damage	
1953-03-19	Saint Lucia	7.3 M_{w}	VII	–	–		
1948-04-21	Dominican Republic	7.1 M_{w}	VII	–	–		
1947-08-06	Cuba	6.6 M_{w}	VI	–	–		
1946-08-08	Dominican Republic	7.0 M_{w}	VII	–	–	Aftershock; extensive damage	
1946-08-04	Dominican Republic	7.8 M_{w}	IX	2,550	–	Extensive damage, destructive tsunami	
1943-07-29	Puerto Rico	7.7 M_{w}	VII	–	–	Moderate damage	
1941-04-07	Jamaica	6.8 M_{w}	VI	–	–		
1932-02-03	Cuba	6.7 M_{w}	VI	8–12	300		
1918-10-11	Puerto Rico	7.1 M_{w}	IX	76–116	–	Extensive damage, destructive tsunami	
1917-07-26	Dominican Republic	6.8 M_{w}	–	–	–		
1917-02-20	Cuba	7.1 M_{w}	–	–	–		
1916-04-23	Dominican Republic	6.8 M_{w}	–	–	–		
1914-10-03	Guadeloupe	7.0 M_{w}	–	–	–		
1911-10-06	Dominican Republic	6.7 M_{w}	–	–	–		
1910-01-23	Trinidad & Tobago	6.5 M_{w}	–	–	–		
1907-01-14	Jamaica	6.2 M_{w}	–	800–1,000	–	Tsunami	
1906-12-03	Martinique	7.2 M_{w}	–	–	–		
1900-10-29	Venezuela	7.7 M_{w}	IX	140	50+	Extensive damage and tsunami	
1868-03-17	Virgin Islands	6.5 M_{h}	–	–	–		
1867-11-18	Virgin Islands	7.2 M_{w}	X	50–100+	–	Destructive tsunami	
1843-02-08	Lesser Antilles	8.5 M_{w}	IX	1,500–5,000	–	Extreme damage	
1842-05-07	Hispaniola	7.6 M_{I}	IX	5,300	–	Severe damage and destructive tsunami	
1839-01-11	Martinique	7.5–8.0 M_{w}	IX	390–4,000	–	Severe damage	
1787-05-02	Puerto Rico	6.9 M_{I}	–	–	–	Severe damage and tsunami	
1770-06-03	Haiti	7.5 M_{w}	X	250+	–	Severe damage and tsunami	
1766-10-21	Venezuela, Trinidad	6.5–7.5 M_{s}	IX	–	–	Severe damage	
1766-06-11	Cuba	6.8 M_{s}	IX	34–40	700	Extensive damage	
1751-11-21	Haiti	8.0 M_{s}	–	–	–	Severe damage	
1692-06-07	Jamaica	7.5 M_{w}	–	~5,000	–	Tsunami. Port Royal destroyed	
1690-04-16	Antigua, Saint Kitts and Nevis	8.0 M_{s}	IX	–	–	Destructive tsunami. Some deaths	
1615-09-07	Hispaniola	7.5 M_{I}	–	–	–	Damage	
1562-12-02	Hispaniola	7.7 M_{I}	–	–	–	Concepción de la Vega destroyed	
Note: The inclusion criteria for adding events are based on WikiProject Earthquakes' notability guideline that was developed for stand alone articles. The principles described also apply to lists. In summary, only damaging, injurious, or deadly events should be recorded.

== See also ==
- List of earthquakes in Cuba
- List of earthquakes in the Dominican Republic
- List of earthquakes in Haiti
- List of earthquakes in Puerto Rico and the Virgin Islands
- Caribbean Disaster Emergency Management Agency (CDEMA)
- University of the West Indies Seismic Research Centre
