= List of earthquakes in the Dominican Republic =

This is a list of earthquakes in the Dominican Republic

== Earthquakes ==
| Date | Location | Mag. | MMI | Deaths | Injuries | Damage / notes | Ref |
|---|---|---|---|---|---|---|---|
| 2025-10-20 | San José de Ocoa | 5.0 M_{w} | V | – | 12 | One school damage | |
| 2021-11-22 | Puerto Plata | 4.5 M_{w} | V | – | – | Schools damaged | |
| 2019-02-04 | La Altagracia | 5.3 M_{w} | V | – | – | Some buildings damaged | |
| 2015-01-14 | Barahona | 3.0 M_{w} | – | 2 | – | Deaths due to mine collapse / Aftershock | |
| 2015-01-13 | Barahona | 4.5 M_{w} | IV | – | – | Schools damaged | |
| 2003-10-16 | Puerto Plata | 4.8 M_{w} | V | – | – | Minor damage / Aftershock | |
| 2003-09-22 | Puerto Plata | 6.4 M_{w} | VII | 3 | Dozens | Significant damage | |
| 1987-09-03 | Monte Cristi | 5.0 M_{w} | IV | – | – | Minor damage | |
| 1987-06-24 | San Pedro de Macoris | 5.2 M_{w} | IV | 5 | – | | |
| 1984-06-24 | San Pedro de Macorís | 6.7 M_{w} | VII | 5 | – | | |
| 1971-06-11 | Santo Domingo | 6.5 M_{w} | V | – | 51 | Minimal damage | |
| 1953-05-31 | Hermanas Mirabal | 6.6 M_{w} | VI | – | – | Some houses damaged | |
| 1948-04-21 | Samaná | 6.9 M_{w} | VII | – | – | | |
| 1946-08-08 | Samaná | 7.0 M_{w} | VII | – | – | Buildings damaged | |
| 1946-08-04 | Samaná | 7.8 M_{w} | IX | 2,550 | – | Destructive tsunami | |
| 1943-07-29 | Mona Passage | 7.7 M_{w} | VII | – | – | Some damage | |
| 1916-11-30 | Samaná | 6.4 M_{w} | – | – | – | | |
| 1916-04-24 | La Altagracia | 6.8 M_{w} | – | – | – | | |
| 1914-02-28 | Hato Mayor | 6.0 M_{w} | – | – | – | | |
| 1911-10-06 | Pedernales | 6.7 M_{w} | – | – | – | | |
| 1842-05-07 | Santiago / Haiti | 7.6 M_{w} | IX | 5,300 | – | | |
| 1615-09-07 | Santo Domingo | 7.5 M_{w} | – | – | – | | |
Note: The inclusion criteria for adding events are based on WikiProject Earthquakes' notability guideline that was developed for stand alone articles. The principles described also apply to lists. In summary, only damaging, injurious, or deadly events should be recorded.

== See also ==
- List of earthquakes in Haiti
- List of earthquakes in Puerto Rico
