= Great Northern Puerto Rico fault zone =

The Great Northern Puerto Rico fault zone (GNPRfz, in Spanish: zona de la Gran Falla del Norte de Puerto Rico) is a major cluster of parallel strike-slip faults located in eastern Puerto Rico. The fault cluster runs roughly about 270 km, spreading northwestwardly inland along the southern edge of the Sierra de Luquillo and extending between the municipalities of Naguabo and Vega Baja. It is located in and represents a portion of the sideways shearing motion between the North American and Caribbean plates. This fault zone was first identified and officially named in 1978 as part of United States Geological Survey (USGS) mappings of the Humacao (USGS Map I‑1070) and Naguabo–Puerca quadrangles (USGS Map I‑1099). Some notable earthquakes to occur along this fault zone happened in 1974, 1990 and 2010. Although no large seismic events have been recorded in modern times, it is estimated that some of the faults in the zone are capable of producing moderate to strong earthquakes (magnitude 6–7+).

== See also ==
- Geology of Puerto Rico
- List of earthquakes in Puerto Rico
