= 1867 Virgin Islands earthquake and tsunami =

Earthquake and tsunami in the Caribbean

1867 Virgin Islands earthquake
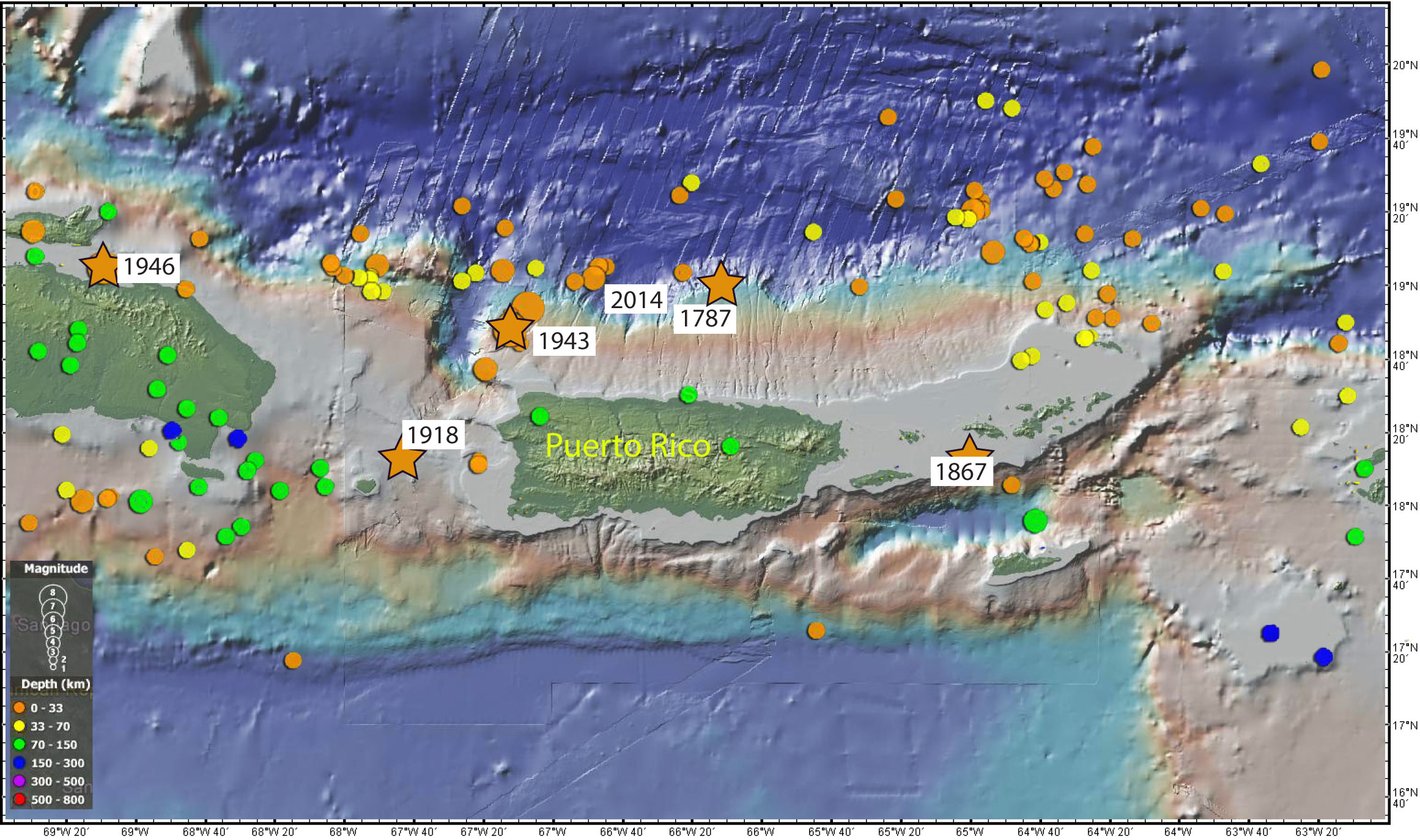
- Map of earthquakes around Puerto Rico. The epicenter of the 1867 earthquake is marked in a star located on the right.

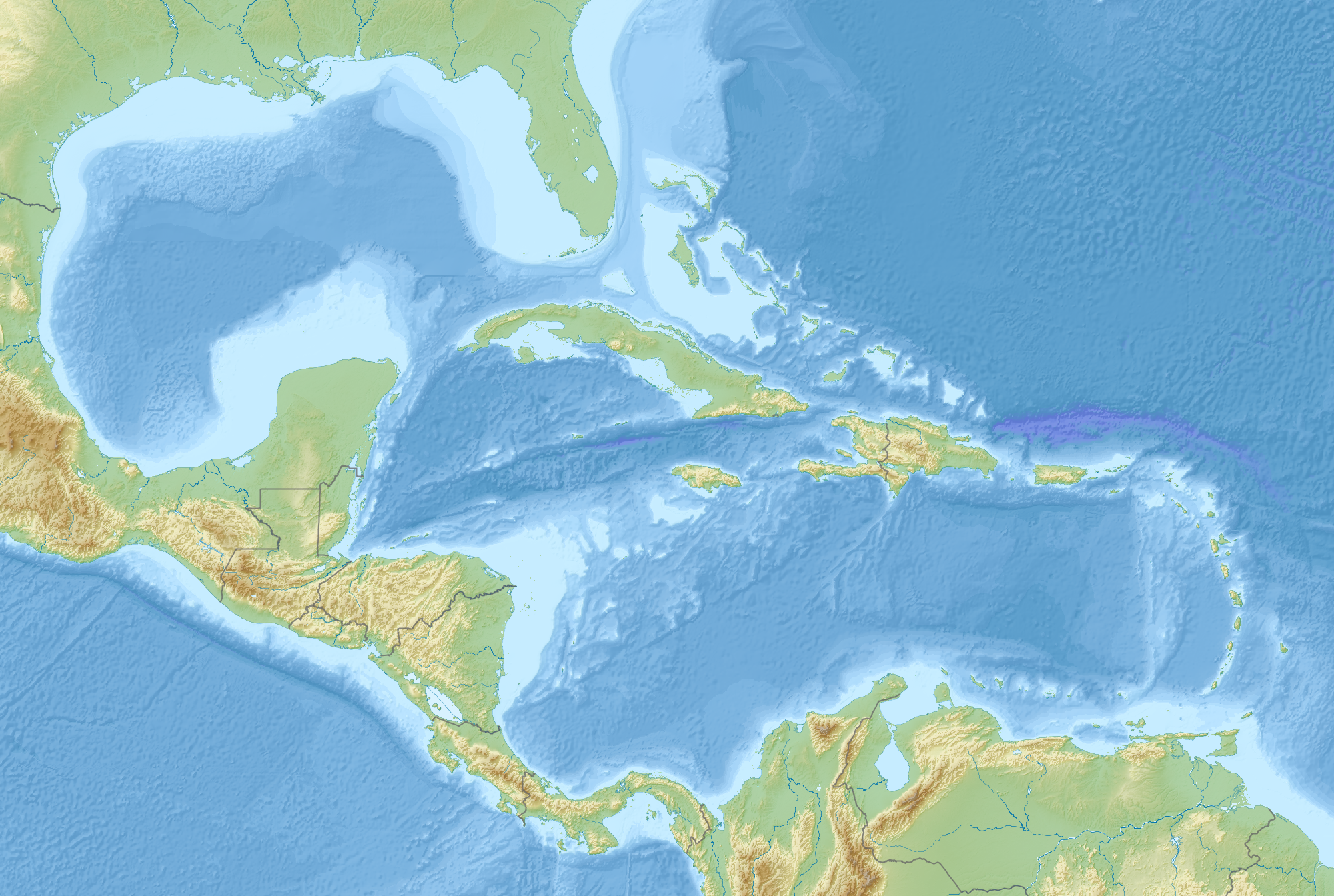
- Location within Middle America
- UTC time: 1867-11-18 18:45:00; 1868-03-17 11:15:00
- USGS-ANSS: ComCat; ComCat
- Local date: 18 November 1867
- Local time: 14:45
- Magnitude: 7.5 M_{s}
- Epicenter: 18.2°N 65.0°W
- Areas affected: Greater Antilles & Lesser Antilles
- Total damage: Extensive
- Max. intensity: RFS IX (Devastating tremor)
- Tsunami: 18.3 m (60 ft)
- Landslides: Possible
- Aftershocks: 6.5 M_{h}
- Casualties: >50–"hundreds" dead

The 1867 Virgin Islands earthquake and tsunami occurred on November 18, at 14.45 in the Anegada Passage about 20 km southwest of Saint Thomas, Danish West Indies (now U.S. Virgin Islands). The M_{s} 7.5 earthquake came just 20 days after the devastating San Narciso Hurricane in the same region. Tsunamis from this earthquake were some of the highest ever recorded in the Lesser Antilles. Wave heights exceeded 10 m (33 ft) in some islands in the Lesser Antilles. The earthquake and tsunami resulted in no more than 50 fatalities, although hundreds of casualties were reported.

== Tectonic setting ==
The U.S.Virgin Islands are part of the Greater Antilles that lies parallel to the Puerto Rico Trench; an oblique subduction zone where the North American plate is underthrusted beneath the Caribbean plate along the Lesser Antilles subduction zone transits to strike-slip along the Septentrional-Oriente fault zone. Because of this transition, the overriding Caribbean plate begins to extend, and normal faults starts to break out as a result. Subduction and shallow crustal faults pose earthquake and tsunami risk to the area, although the Lesser Antilles megathrust has not seen any major earthquake along its subduction interface. A possible earthquake along the megathrust may have been the M_{w} 8.3, 1843 Guadeloupe earthquake.

== Earthquake ==
The earthquake consisted of two shocks, 10 minutes apart, and the two tsunamis came 10 minutes after each shock. Shaking reportedly lasted a minute in Frederiksted, where the earthquake stirred a dust cloud that blanketed the town. Shaking reached intensity IX on the Rossi–Forel scale in the Danish West Indies. Rossi–Forel IX-level shaking was also felt on the British Virgin Islands, Puerto Rico and U.S. Virgin Islands. Survivor accounts stated that there were two distinct shocks 10–15 minutes apart. On the Modified Mercalli intensity scale, the intensity ranged from VIII (Severe) to X (Extreme).

In Puerto Rico, the earthquake heavily damaged portions of the city wall of San Juan, which prompted the demolition of its southeastern portion afterwards. Fajardo, the largest town in Puerto Rico within the direct vicinity of the earthquake, completely lost its church and several of its civic structures. The historic parish churches of Bayamón, Cidra and Juana Díaz were also damaged as a result of the earthquakes.

An aftershock with a magnitude of M_{h} 6.5 occurred on March 17, 1868. There is uncertainty about its timing of occurrence, either 07:15 or 19:15 local time as several reports documented it happening in the morning while one reported it in the "evening". Most likely it occurred in the morning and "evening" was a typographical error. It was felt with a maximum Modified Mercalli intensity of VII (Very strong) and a 1.2 m (3 ft 11 in) tsunami accompanied the shock.

== Tsunami ==
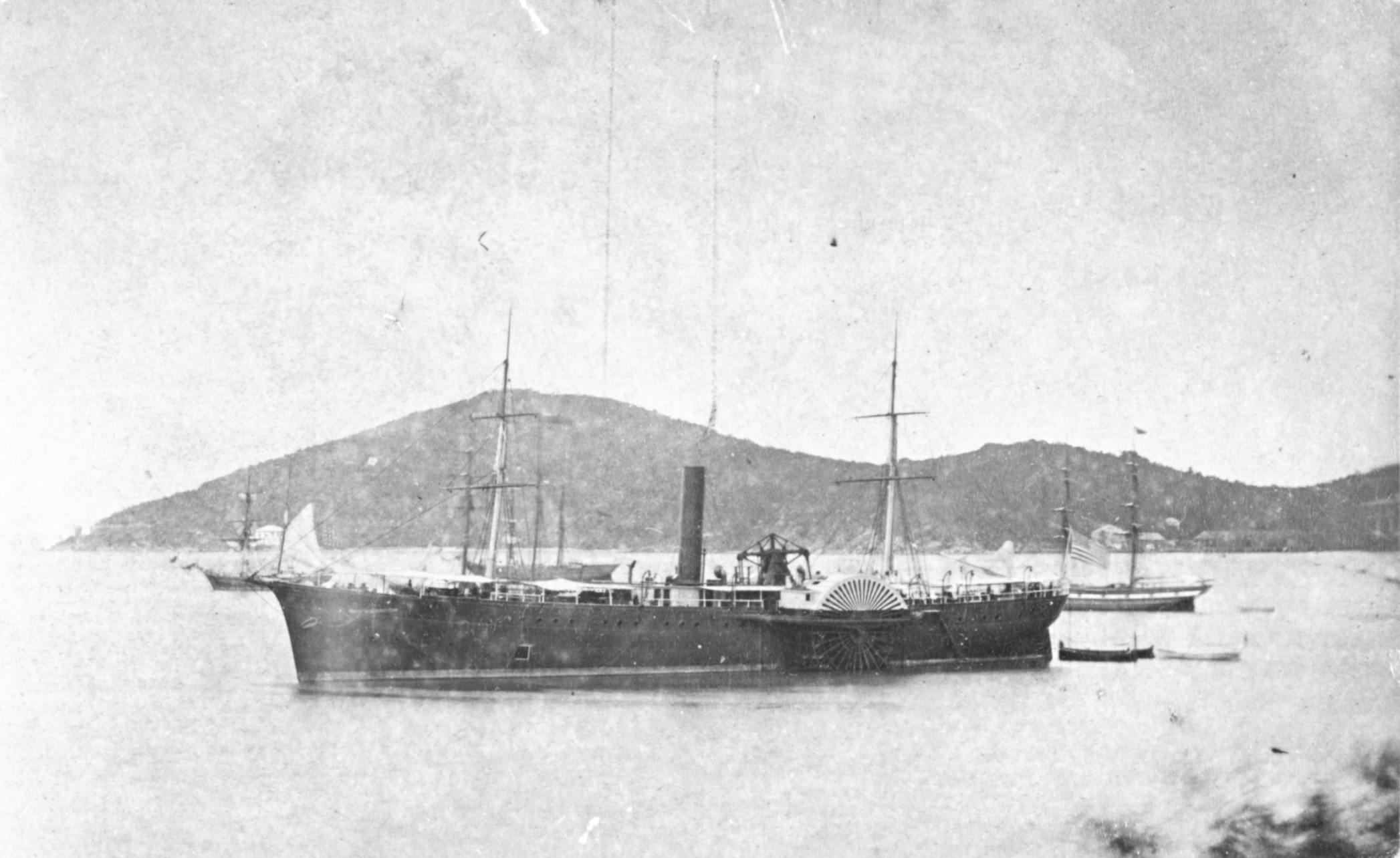
The USS De Soto after repairs seen in Puerto Rico in 1868.

At Saint Thomas, the first wave was described as a "straight white wall, about 4.6–7.0 m (15.1–23.0 ft)" which advanced to the harbor, ten minutes after the earthquake. The wave picked up steamers along the way and broke to just a few feet in front of the town. The run-up height was 9.1 m (30 ft) across the town. A smaller wave came shortly and penetrated further in the island. Thirty people perished when the waves swept them away. Run-ups of 6.0 m (19.7 ft) were recorded at Charlotte Amalie, where 12 people died. The La Plata, a steamship serving the Royal Mail Steam Packet Company was swamped by the tsunami, killing nearly all of its crew on board.

Little Saba saw the highest waves at 15.2 m (50 ft). A US Navy ship which had arrived the day before, the USS De Soto, was ripped from her moorings and beached. The second wave then brought the ship with her hull seriously damaged back to sea.

At Christiansted, Saint Croix, the 7–9 m (23–30 ft) waves drowned five people and inundated the island up to 90 m (300 ft) inland. The tsunami destroyed 20 houses and stranded numerous boats inland. In some parts of the island, the waves reached a run-up height of 14.6 m (48 ft). Frederiksted on the same island was hit by waves up to 7.6 m (25 ft). The surging seawater beached many vessels including a US Navy ship, USS Monongahela along the beaches of Frederiksted. The tsunami measured 12 m (39 ft) on Water Island.

Meanwhile, at Road Town, British Virgin Islands, the waves were between 1.2 m (3 ft 11 in) and 1.5 m (4 ft 11 in) meters which swept away much of the low-lying towns. In Antigua, the sea level rose 2.4–3.0 m (7 ft 10 in – 9 ft 10 in) at Saint John harbor.

Eyewitnesses in Basse-Terre, Guadeloupe saw the sea receding and returning, flooding the place up to 2.0 m (6 ft 7 in). Deshayes was hit with very high waves, an estimated 18.3 m (60 ft) in height and a length of 5 km (3.1 mi). The tsunami swept away many personal belongings and items. In Saint-Rose however, the waves were determined to be no more than 10.0 m (32.8 ft) when a church said to house fleeing survivors located 10 m (33 ft) above sea-level remained undamaged. In Puerto Rico, waves of 1–6 m (3 ft 3 in – 19 ft 8 in) swept through the island's coast.

== Scientific analysis ==
Little research has been made to study the earthquake and tsunami in detail. Tsunami deposits on Saint Thomas left in salt ponds and lagoons have not been extensively studied. Although the Caribbean has over 124 reported tsunamis or tsunami-like events since 1498, 27 of them have resulted in fatalities.

A study by Zahibo and others published a surface-wave magnitude of 7.5 (M_{s}) at a hypocenter depth of less than 30 km (19 mi). The source of the earthquake is located in the Anegada Passage. The Reid Fault located 17 km (11 mi) south of Saint Thomas on the northern scarp of the Anegada Trough runs for seven tens of kilometers may have ruptured and produced slip no greater than ten meter. The rupture may have initiated at a depth of 3 km along this thrust fault. An underwater landslide triggered by movement on the seafloor would likely be the primary source of the tsunami as the run-up heights of the tsunami were unusually high, and these waves arrived almost immediately after the quake. Computer-run simulations of the tsunami suggest the earthquake ruptured a steeply-dipping (70°), 120 km (75 mi) by 30 km (19 mi) fault with a focus depth of 3 km (1.9 mi). The simulation indicated a maximum slip of 8 m (26 ft). Another simulation of the earthquake and tsunami suggest the rupture was only 50 km in length, corresponding to a M_{w} 7.2 earthquake.

== See also ==
- List of earthquakes in the Caribbean
- List of earthquakes in Puerto Rico
- 2019–20 Puerto Rico earthquakes
