= 1839 Martinique earthquake =

Earthquake in the Lesser Antilles

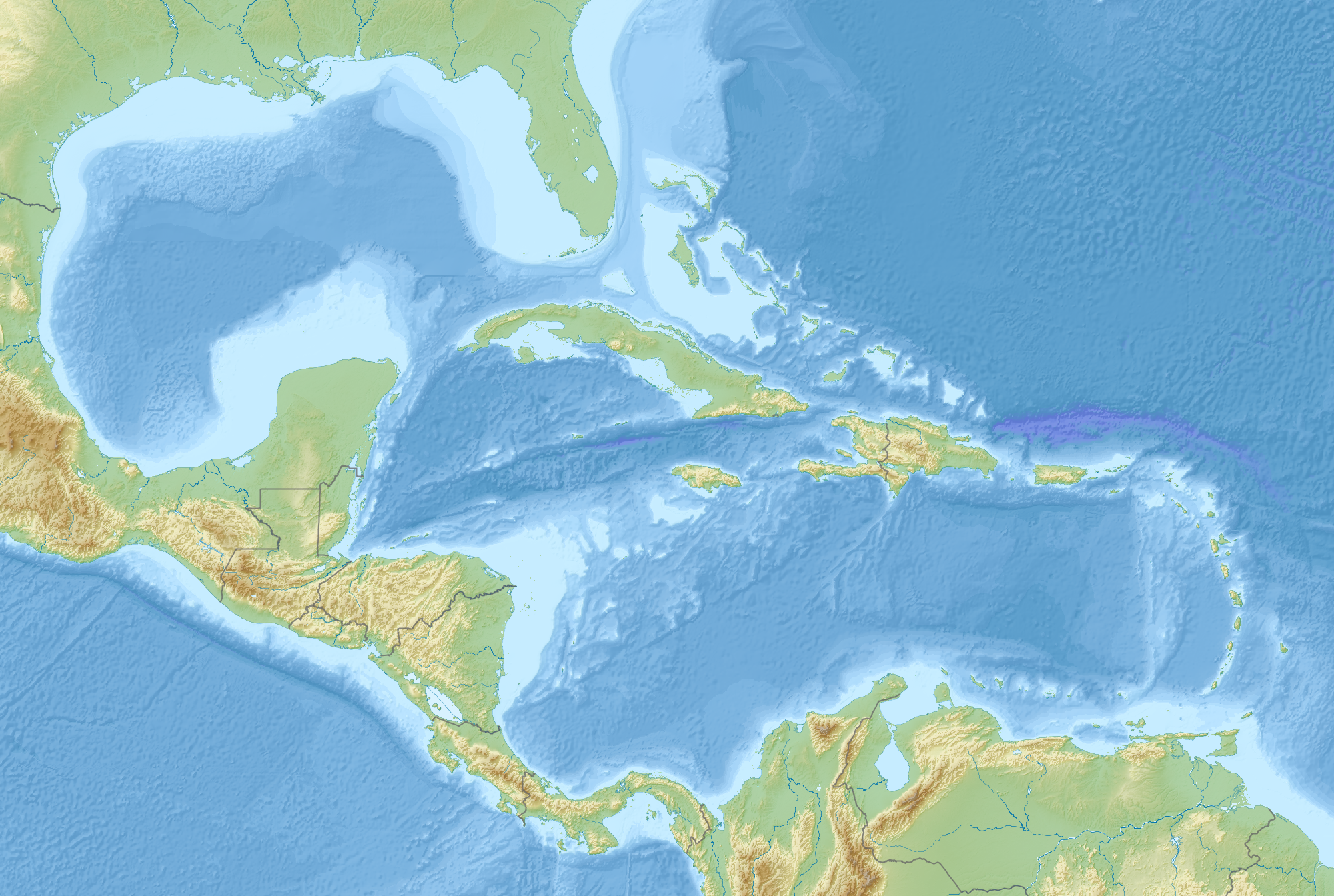
- Location within Middle America
- Local date: 11 January 1839
- Local time: 06:00 am AST
- Magnitude: 7.7–7.8 M_{s} 7.5–8.0 M_{w}
- Depth: 33 km (21 mi)
- Epicenter: 14.5°N 60.5°W
- Type: Megathrust
- Areas affected: Lesser Antilles
- Total damage: > 15 million Francs
- Max. intensity: MMI IX (Violent)
- Tsunami: None
- Landslides: Yes
- Casualties: 390–4,000 dead 28,975 injured

The 1839 Martinique earthquake occurred on the morning of January 11 with an estimated magnitude of 7.8 M_{s}, the largest in the Lesser Antilles since 1690. The maximum intensity of this earthquake was assigned IX on both the Mercalli and MSK intensity scales, which left the cities of Saint-Pierre and Fort Royal almost completely destroyed. Estimation on the number of human losses varies from 390 to 4,000 making this one of the deadliest earthquakes in the Caribbean.

== Tectonic setting ==
The Lesser Antilles subduction zone marks the boundary where the North American plate subducts or dives beneath the Caribbean plate at ~2 cm/yr along the subduction interface. Interaction between these two lithospheres can sometimes produce megathrust earthquakes although there has been no recent megathrust quakes on the fault other than the 1839 and 1843 events. Moderately large earthquakes have occurred near the megathrust in recent years but none on the megathrust. Since 1973, there have only been just a little over 30 thrust earthquakes on the subduction zone with magnitudes around the 5.0 range. A plausible explanation for this is the slow rate of convergence resulting in the megathrust becoming seismically devoid of activity for hundreds to thousands of years before rupturing in great quakes. A similar effect was seen prior to the 2004 Sumatra-Andaman earthquake, and in Japan's Nankai Trough and the Cascadia subduction zone. At the present moment, the Lesser Antilles subduction zone has been determined to be locked and has the potential to generate an earthquake of M_{w}8.95 to 9.58.

== Earthquake ==
On Martinique, intensity IX was felt throughout the island. On the islands of Saint Lucia and Dominica, intensity IX persisted, but weakened to VIII at the southern and northern part of the islands respectively. Level VIII to VI was felt in Guadeloupe and on Saint Vincent and the Grenadines. Barbados was hit with VII shaking. Weaker intensities of V and lesser was felt in the northern Lesser Antilles and in Venezuela, Guyana and Suriname. A moment magnitude of 8.0 is more consistent with the intensities reported.

It is believed that the megathrust ruptured for 140 km and had an average slip of 8 meters. Estimates for the earthquake's magnitude varies between 7.5 and 8.0 on the M_{w} and M_{s} scales. A probable epicenter location is east of Martinique, west of where the Saint Lucia Ridge subducts. This area is known for its high seismicity, and small earthquakes are recorded regularly. A seismic swarm was reported in the Valley of Desolation on Dominica in 1841; a similar observation made in 1843 after the M_{w} 8.5 Guadeloupe earthquake. Both earthquakes likely increased the coulomb stress on shallow faults within the island arc which promoted two significant earthquakes in 1897. They also raised the extensional strain on several volcanoes except Soufrière Hills.

== Impact ==
The morning of January 11 in Martinique was disrupted by three instances of violent shaking which varied in duration from 30 seconds to two minutes. The earthquake was felt throughout the Lesser Antilles but the most serious damage was on the island of Martinique. At Fort Royal, the entire city was near totally destroyed. Of the 800 buildings, only 50 to 60 were still safe for occupancy, with 600 completely collapsed and the other 200 partially destroyed. Hotels, a theater, artillery barracks, hospital, and official buildings were among the infrastructures destroyed. The earthquake also damaged the aqueduct which supplies the city with water. Heaps of rubble up to three meters high was left in the quake's aftermath. The devastation was great due to the city being built on marshlands rather than on a stable rocky base.

Other cities saw serious destruction but not as severe like in Fort Royal. An area in Saint-Pierre was heavily affected where all but two or three houses were left standing. In other parts of the island, churches and stone construction collapsed. About 300 to 4,000 people died from the earthquake; the death toll varied because officials had not counted the number of slaves killed to avoid compensation requests by their owners.

Like the earthquake which occurred in 1843, no tsunami was generated.

== See also ==
- List of earthquakes in the Caribbean
- History of Martinique
