= List of earthquakes in 1943 =

Earthquakes in 1943
Approximate epicenters of notable earthquakes in 1943
- 4.0–5.9 magnitude
- 6.0–6.9 magnitude
- 7.0–7.9 magnitude
- 8.0+ magnitude
- Strongest: Chile, Coquimbo Region (Magnitude 8.1) April 6
- Deadliest: Turkey, Cankiri Province (Magnitude 7.5) November 26 4,020 deaths
- Total fatalities: 6,187

Number by magnitude
- 9.0+: 0

This is a list of earthquakes in 1943. Only magnitude 6.0 or greater earthquakes appear on the list. Lower magnitude events are included if they have caused death, injury, or damage. Events which occurred in remote areas will be excluded from the list as they wouldn't have generated significant media interest. All dates are listed according to UTC time. The planet experienced an unusually busy year, with twenty-nine earthquakes that reached 7.0 or greater. The largest occurred in Chile and measured a magnitude of 8.1, but Dutch East Indies, the Philippines, Turkey, the United States, Japan and Russia all had large events above magnitude 7.0. The year was characterised by a number of quakes that caused substantial deaths. Faring worst was Turkey, which had three separate deadly events, including the deadliest of the year in November. Japan had an earthquake in September which caused 1,400 deaths.

== Overall ==
=== By death toll ===
Rank	Death toll	Magnitude	Location	MMI	Depth (km)	Date
1	4,020	7.5	Turkey, Cankiri Province	XI (Extreme)	20.0	November 26
2	1,400	7.0	Empire of Japan, Tottori Prefecture, Honshu	VII (Very strong)	15.0	September 10
3	285	6.2	Turkey, Kocaeli Province	X (Extreme)	35.0	June 20
4	213	7.0	Empire of Japan, south of Java, Dutch East Indies	VIII (Severe)	60.0	July 23
5	101	6.5	USSR, Gorno-Badakhshan Autonomous Region, Tajikistan	( )	100.0	April 5
6	75	5.0	Peru, Cusco Region	( )	0.0	January 31
7	51	5.0	Free France, Bordj Bou Arreridj Province, Algeria	( )	0.0	April 16
8	19	0.0	Independent State of Croatia, Republika Srpska, Bosnia and Herzegovina	( )	0.0	January 29
= 9	11	7.4	Mexico, off the coast of Guerrero	VII (Very strong)	20.0	February 22
= 9	11	8.1	Chile, Coquimbo Region	VII (Very strong)	35.0	April 6

- Note: At least 10 casualties

=== By magnitude ===
Rank	Magnitude	Death toll	Location	MMI	Depth (km)	Date
1	8.1	11	Chile Coquimbo Region	VII (Very strong)	35.0	April 6
= 2	7.8	0	Empire of Japan, east of Mindanao, Philippines	VI (Strong)	15.0	May 25
= 2	7.8	0	Empire of Japan, southern Sumatra, Dutch East Indies	VII (Very strong)	10.0	June 9
= 3	7.7	0	United States, north of Puerto Rico	VI (Strong)	15.0	July 29
= 3	7.7	0	Empire of Japan, Aru Islands, Dutch East Indies	VII (Very strong)	15.0	November 6
= 4	7.6	0	United States, southern Alaska	VII (Very strong)	15.0	November 3
= 4	7.6	0	USSR, western Kamchatka Krai, Russia	( )	350.0	November 28
5	7.5	4,020	Turkey, Cankiri Province	XI (Extreme)	20.0	November 26
= 6	7.4	11	Mexico, off the coast of Guerrero	VII (Very strong)	20.0	February 22
= 6	7.4	0	Empire of Japan, southern Sumatra, Dutch East Indies	VII (Very strong)	15.0	June 8
= 6	7.4	0	Australia north of Macquarie Island	( )	10.0	September 6
= 7	7.2	0	Chile, Tarapaca Region	( )	120.0	March 14
= 7	7.2	0	Empire of Japan, southeast of Luzon, Philippines	VII (Very strong)	15.0	May 3
= 7	7.2	0	Empire of Japan, off the northeast coast of Honshu	V (Moderate)	35.0	June 13
= 7	7.2	0	India, Assam	VII (Very strong)	15.0	October 23
= 7	7.2	0	New Hebrides, Vanuatu	( )	35.0	November 13
= 7	7.2	0	Australia, East Sepik Province, New Guinea	( )	119.7	December 1
= 8	7.1	0	Empire of Japan, Sunda Strait, Dutch East Indies	VII (Very strong)	35.0	April 1
= 8	7.1	0	Empire of Japan, southern Sumatra, Dutch East Indies	( )	140.0	November 26
= 9	7.0	0	Peru, Puno Region	( )	120.0	February 16
= 9	7.0	0	Afghanistan, Badakhshan Province	( )	207.5	February 28
= 9	7.0	0	United Kingdom, South Sandwich Islands	( )	20.0	March 9
= 9	7.0	0	Empire of Japan, Northern Mariana Islands	( )	157.5	April 9
= 9	7.0	213	Empire of Japan, south of Java, Dutch East Indies	VIII (Severe)	60.0	July 23
= 9	7.0	0	New Hebrides, Vanuatu	( )	225.0	August 1
= 9	7.0	1,400	Empire of Japan, Tottori Prefecture, Honshu	VII (Very strong)	15.0	September 10
= 9	7.0	0	Empire of Japan, south of Honshu, Japan	( )	335.0	November 17
= 9	7.0	0	Chile, Tarapaca Region	( )	114.2	December 1
= 9	7.0	0	Australia, west of Bougainville Island, New Guinea	V (Moderate)	35.0	December 23

- Note: At least 7.0 magnitude

== Notable events ==
=== January ===
January
- Strongest: 6.3 M_{w} USSR
- Deadliest: 5.0 M_{w} Peru; 75 deaths
- Total fatalities: 94

Number by magnitude
- 8.0–8.9: 0
- 7.0–7.9: 0
- 6.0–6.9: 2
- 5.0–5.9: 1

Date	Country and location	M_{w}	Depth (km)	MMI	Notes	Casualties	
Date	Country and location	M_{w}	Depth (km)	MMI	Notes	Dead	Injured
11	USSR, Surxondaryo Region, Uzbekistan	6.3	35.0	VI			
29	Independent State of Croatia, Republika Srpska, Bosnia and Herzegovina	0.0	0.0		19 people were killed and some damage was reported. Magnitude and depth unknown.	19	
30	Ecuador, Guayas Province	6.1	58.7	VI	Many homes were damaged.		
31	Peru, Cusco Region	5.0	0.0		75 people were killed and 200 more were injured. Some damage was caused. Depth unknown.	75	200

=== February ===
February
- Strongest: 7.4 M_{w} Mexico
- Deadliest: 7.4 M_{w} Mexico; 11 deaths
- Total fatalities: 11

Number by magnitude
- 8.0–8.9: 0
- 7.0–7.9: 3
- 6.0–6.9: 1

Date	Country and location	M_{w}	Depth (km)	MMI	Notes	Casualties	
Date	Country and location	M_{w}	Depth (km)	MMI	Notes	Dead	Injured
6	India, off the coast of Pakistan	6.2	35.0				
16	Peru, Puno Region	7.0	120.0				
22	Mexico, off the coast of Guerrero	7.4	20.0	VII	11 people were killed and major damage was reported.	11	
28	Afghanistan, Badakhshan Province	7.0	207.5				

=== March ===
March
- Strongest: 7.2 M_{w} Chile
- Total fatalities: 0

Number by magnitude
- 8.0–8.9: 0
- 7.0–7.9: 2
- 6.0–6.9: 7

Date	Country and location	M_{w}	Depth (km)	MMI	Notes	Casualties	
Date	Country and location	M_{w}	Depth (km)	MMI	Notes	Dead	Injured
9	United Kingdom, South Sandwich Islands	7.0	20.0				
14	Free France, southeast of the Loyalty Islands, New Caledonia	6.5	35.0		Foreshock.		
14	Chile, Tarapaca Region	7.2	120.0				
15	Free France, southeast of the Loyalty Islands, New Caledonia	6.9	35.0				
15	Empire of Japan, western Caroline Islands	6.8	35.0				
15	Fiji	6.8	297.9				
21	Australia, West New Britain Province, New Guinea	6.6	35.0	VII			
26	Fiji	6.9	85.0				
29	Free France, off the west coast of Madagascar	6.0	35.0				

=== April ===
April
- Strongest: 8.1 M_{w} Chile
- Deadliest: 6.5 M_{w} USSR; 101+ deaths
- Total fatalities: 163+

Number by magnitude
- 8.0–8.9: 1
- 7.0–7.9: 2
- 6.0–6.9: 4
- 5.0–5.9: 1

Date	Country and location	M_{w}	Depth (km)	MMI	Notes	Casualties	
Date	Country and location	M_{w}	Depth (km)	MMI	Notes	Dead	Injured
1	Empire of Japan, Sunda Strait, Dutch East Indies	7.1	35.0	VII			
5	USSR, Gorno-Badakhshan Autonomous Region, Tajikistan	6.5	100.0		At least 101 people were killed. Many homes were destroyed.	101+	
5	Peru, San Martin Region	6.5	140.0				
6	Chile, Coquimbo Region	8.1	35.0	VII	Due to the 1943 Ovalle earthquake 11 people lost their lives. Some damage was reported as well as a small tsunami. The tsunami caused minor damage.	11	
9	Empire of Japan, Northern Mariana Islands	7.0	157.5				
11	Empire of Japan, off the east coast of Honshu	6.8	15.0	IV			
16	Free France, Bordj Bou Arreridj Province, Algeria	5.0	0.0		At least 51 people were killed. Depth unknown.	51+	
28	Fiji	6.5	530.0				

=== May ===
May
- Strongest: 7.8 M_{w} Empire of Japan
- Total fatalities: 0

Number by magnitude
- 8.0–8.9: 0
- 7.0–7.9: 2
- 6.0–6.9: 4

Date	Country and location	M_{w}	Depth (km)	MMI	Notes	Casualties	
Date	Country and location	M_{w}	Depth (km)	MMI	Notes	Dead	Injured
2	Panama, south of	6.8	20.0	VI			
3	Empire of Japan, southeast of Luzon, Philippines	7.2	15.0	VII			
22	Chile, Coquimbo Region	6.2	35.0	VI			
25	Empire of Japan, east of Mindanao, Philippines	7.8	15.0	VI			
26	Mexico, off the west coast	6.5	35.0				
28	Fiji	6.5	630.0				

=== June ===
June
- Strongest: 7.8 M_{w} Empire of Japan
- Deadliest: 6.2 M_{w} Turkey; 285 deaths
- Total fatalities: 286+

Number by magnitude
- 8.0–8.9: 0
- 7.0–7.9: 3
- 6.0–6.9: 6
- 5.0–5.9: 1

Date	Country and location	M_{w}	Depth (km)	MMI	Notes	Casualties	
Date	Country and location	M_{w}	Depth (km)	MMI	Notes	Dead	Injured
3	United Kingdom, Tonga	6.5	35.0				
8	Empire of Japan, southern Sumatra, Dutch East Indies	7.4	15.0	VII	1943 Alahan Panjang earthquakes. Foreshock.		
9	Empire of Japan, southern Sumatra, Dutch East Indies	7.8	10.0	VII	1943 Alahan Panjang earthquakes.		
13	Empire of Japan, off the northeast coast of Honshu	7.2	35.0	V			
13	Empire of Japan, off the northeast coast of Honshu	6.5	0.0		Aftershock.		
13	Empire of Japan, off the northeast coast of Honshu	6.4	31.0		Aftershock.		
20	Turkey, Kocaeli Province	6.2	35.0	X	The 1943 Adapazari-Hendek earthquake resulted in 285 deaths and major damage.	285	
21	Republic of China (1912-1949), Sichuan Province	5.0	0.0	VI	At least 1 person died and some homes collapsed.	1+	
29	Empire of Japan, Celebes Sea, Dutch East Indies	6.5	180.0				
30	Empire of Japan, Flores Sea, Dutch East Indies	6.8	720.0				

=== July ===
July
- Strongest: 7.7 M_{w} United States
- Deadliest: 7.0 M_{w} Empire of Japan; 213 deaths
- Total fatalities: 213

Number by magnitude
- 8.0–8.9: 0
- 7.0–7.9: 2
- 6.0–6.9: 3

Date	Country and location	M_{w}	Depth (km)	MMI	Notes	Casualties	
Date	Country and location	M_{w}	Depth (km)	MMI	Notes	Dead	Injured
5	Peru, Arequipa Region	6.8	35.0				
11	New Zealand, south of the Kermadec Islands	6.7	15.0				
23	Empire of Japan, off south coast of Java, Dutch East Indies	7.0	60.0	VIII	213 people were killed and 2,096 were injured in the 1943 Central Java earthquake. 2,800 homes sustained damage.	213	2,096
29	United States, north of Puerto Rico	7.7	15.0	VI	No fatalities, minor tsunami in the 1943 Puerto Rico earthquake.		
30	United States, northwest of Puerto Rico	6.5	35.0		Aftershock		

=== August ===
August
- Strongest: 7.0 M_{w} New Hebrides
- Total fatalities: 0

Number by magnitude
- 8.0–8.9: 0
- 7.0–7.9: 1
- 6.0–6.9: 2

Date	Country and location	M_{w}	Depth (km)	MMI	Notes	Casualties	
Date	Country and location	M_{w}	Depth (km)	MMI	Notes	Dead	Injured
1	New Hebrides, Vanuatu	7.0	225.0				
2	New Zealand, Southland District, South Island	6.7	15.0	VII			
31	Guatemala, Escuintla Department	6.8	87.5				

=== September ===
September
- Strongest: 7.4 M_{w} Australia
- Deadliest: 7.0 M_{w} Empire of Japan; 1,400 deaths
- Total fatalities: 1,400

Number by magnitude
- 8.0–8.9: 0
- 7.0–7.9: 2
- 6.0–6.9: 7

Date	Country and location	M_{w}	Depth (km)	MMI	Notes	Casualties	
Date	Country and location	M_{w}	Depth (km)	MMI	Notes	Dead	Injured
6	Australia, north of Macquarie Island	7.4	10.0				
9	Afghanistan, Badakhshan Province	6.2	200.0				
10	Empire of Japan, Tottori Prefecture, Japan	7.0	15.0	VII	1,400 people were killed in the 1943 Tottori earthquake. 7,739 homes were destroyed.	1,400	
14	Free France, southeast of the Loyalty Islands	6.5	15.0				
14	Free France, southeast of the Loyalty Islands	6.7	15.0				
14	New Zealand, Kermadec Islands	6.9	35.0				
22	New Zealand, north of North Island	6.8	35.0				
23	Guatemala, Quetzaltenango Department	6.8	91.8				
24	India, Gilgit-Baltistan, Pakistan	6.8	120.0				

=== October ===
October
- Strongest: 7.2 M_{w} India
- Total fatalities: 0

Number by magnitude
- 8.0–8.9: 0
- 7.0–7.9: 1
- 6.0–6.9: 2

Date	Country and location	M_{w}	Depth (km)	MMI	Notes	Casualties	
Date	Country and location	M_{w}	Depth (km)	MMI	Notes	Dead	Injured
13	Empire of Japan, Nagano Prefecture, Honshu	6.0	35.0				
16	Nazi Germany, Dodecanese Islands, Greece	6.2	110.0				
23	India, Assam	7.2	15.0	VII	Some damage was reported in Myanmar.		

=== November ===
November
- Strongest: 7.7 M_{w} Empire of Japan
- Deadliest: 7.5 M_{w} Turkey; 4,020 deaths
- Total fatalities: 4,020

Number by magnitude
- 8.0–8.9: 0
- 7.0–7.9: 7
- 6.0–6.9: 3

Date	Country and location	M_{w}	Depth (km)	MMI	Notes	Casualties	
Date	Country and location	M_{w}	Depth (km)	MMI	Notes	Dead	Injured
3	United States, southern Alaska	7.6	15.0	VII			
6	Empire of Japan, Aru Islands, Dutch East Indies	7.7	15.0	VII			
9	USSR, Kuril Islands	6.8	65.0				
13	New Hebrides, Vanuatu	7.2	35.0				
17	Empire of Japan, off the south coast of Honshu	7.0	335.0				
24	Empire of Japan, off the east coast of Taiwan	6.5	20.0	VI			
26	Empire of Japan, southern Sumatra, Dutch East Indies	7.1	140.0				
26	Turkey, Cankiri Province	7.5	20.0	XI	The 1943 Tosya–Ladik earthquake caused 4,020 deaths. 5,000 people were injured. 40,000 homes were destroyed.	4,020	5,000
28	USSR, western Kamchatka Krai	7.6	350.0		Some damage was reported.		
29	Argentina, Catamarca Province	6.4	15.0	VI			

=== December ===
December
- Strongest: 7.2 M_{w} Australia
- Total fatalities: 0

Number by magnitude
- 8.0–8.9: 0
- 7.0–7.9: 3
- 6.0–6.9: 4

Date	Country and location	M_{w}	Depth (km)	MMI	Notes	Casualties	
Date	Country and location	M_{w}	Depth (km)	MMI	Notes	Dead	Injured
1	Australia, East Sepik Province, New Guinea	7.2	119.7				
1	Chile, Tarapaca Region	7.0	114.2				
2	Empire of Japan, off the east coast of Taiwan	6.8	15.0	VII			
7	Mexico, Oaxaca	6.0	60.0				
22	Ecuador, Pastaza Province	6.2	130.0				
22	Colombia, off the northeast coast	6.5	35.0				
23	Australia, west of Bougainville Island, New Guinea	7.0	35.0	V			
