= 1787 Boricua earthquake =

Earthquake that struck Puerto Rico

- Local date: May 2, 1787
- Magnitude: 6.9 M_{I} 8.0–8.25 M_{w}
- Areas affected: Puerto Rico
- Tsunami: Yes
- Casualties: unknown

The 1787 Boricua earthquake struck offshore of the island of Puerto Rico on May 2. The magnitude of the earthquake was believed to have been around 8.0–8.25, however there is evidence that it was only about 6.9. The epicenter is thought to have been somewhere north of Puerto Rico, probably on the Puerto Rico Trench. Puerto Rican geomorphologist José Molinelli considers it "the strongest" in the seismic history of the country.

== Effects ==
According to some sources, the earthquake was felt all across the Island. It demolished some structures like the Arecibo church, along with monasteries like El Rosario and La Concepcion. It is also reported that it damaged the churches at Bayamon, Toa Baja and Mayagüez. It also caused considerable damage to the forts of San Felipe del Morro and San Cristobal, breaking cisterns, walls and guard houses. Apparently, the earthquake did not cause major damage in the South of the island, but did crack the walls of the Our Lady of Guadalupe church in Ponce.

There are no historical records of damage to the surrounding islands, adding to the evidence that the quake was smaller than previously thought.

== Evidence ==
The earthquake that struck the island has little historical record itself, but some of the little evidence that exists suggests that effects were done to the topography of the ocean floor. Also, soil deposits give evidence that the event may have had a physical effect on the island; this evidence suggests that the island may have sunk about 3 meters. It is estimated that the tsunami produced by the earthquake may have been some 40–60 ft (12–18 m) high, mostly because the Caribbean ocean in particular is quite shallow. Coastal regions of the island were swamped, producing a thin layer of the crust, showing that salt water had reached almost 2 miles inland.

== See also ==
- 1867 Virgin Islands earthquake and tsunami
- 1918 San Fermín earthquake
- List of earthquakes in 1918
- List of earthquakes in Puerto Rico
- List of earthquakes in the Caribbean
