= 1943 Puerto Rico earthquake =

- Location within Puerto Rico
- UTC time: 1943-07-29 03:02:17
- ISC event: 899944
- USGS-ANSS: ComCat
- Local date: 1943-07-28
- Local time: 23:02:17
- Magnitude: 7.7 M_{w}
- Depth: 33 km (21 mi)
- Epicenter: 18.907°N 67.118°W
- Type: Thrust (reverse fault)
- Areas affected: Puerto Rico
- Total damage: $2 million USD
- Max. intensity: MMI VI (Strong)
- Tsunami: Yes
- Casualties: Minor injuries

The 1943 Puerto Rico earthquake struck off the northwestern coast of the island of Puerto Rico at approximately 23:02 AST on July 28, 1943 (03:02 UTC on July 29). The earthquake, measured at 7.7 on the moment magnitude scale (M_{w}) by the United States Geological Service (USGS), struck in or near the eastern slope of the Mona Canyon along the Puerto Rico Trench, approximately 44 kilometres (27 mi) north of Aguadilla and 57 kilometres (35 mi) northwest of Arecibo. A small tsunami was reported along the northwestern coast of Puerto Rico but no fatalities or significant damages were reported.

It was the largest earthquake to impact the area since the destructive 1918 event. Despite being the largest earthquake to directly impact Puerto Rico in the 20th century, it produced no fatalities due to the time and depth of the seismic movement. Only minor injuries and moderate infrastructure damages totaling up to US$2 million were reported as a result.

== Earthquake ==
The 1943 Puerto Rico earthquake sequence took place along the Puerto Rico Trench, not far from the same epicenter of the 1918 earthquake, where the North American Plate subdues beneath the Caribbean Plate. According to global moment tensor catalogs and later analyses, the rupture likely occurred on a southwest-dipping thrust fault at the plate interface. The focal mechanism indicates a low-angle thrust fault, characteristic of subduction-interface earthquakes. There are varying measured estimations of the hypocenter, occurring at between 15 and 68 km deep, consistent with interface slip events in subduction zones.

The main shock occurred on Wednesday, July 28 at 23:02 local time. According to anecdotal reports, the main temblor had a total duration of between two and three minutes, although no precise scientific duration measurements exist. Widespread panic lead to temporary mass evacuations of buildings, particularly residential structures in downtowns (pueblos) across Puerto Rico. The first event caused high-rise buildings in San Juan and Ponce to swing, causing people to wake up and abandon their homes across the island. The Puerto Rico Civil Defense Force, precursor to the National Guard, was mobilized to assess damages, help with rescue and prevent possible looting. Residents of Mayagüez abandoned their homes and camped outdoors for fears of stronger earthquakes. Strong shaking was also felt across Hispaniola, particularly in Port-au-Prince and Santo Domingo (then called Ciudad Trujillo) where it caused widespread panic.

According to Observatorio Insular director Carl A. Ludy, the earthquake was so significant it damaged both existing seismometers in Puerto Rico, and it was felt by instruments across eastern United States and Europe, particularly at the Fordham University in New York City, the Weston Observatory in Massachusetts, and as far as Jena in Germany and Belgrade in Serbia.

=== Tsunami ===
A small tsunami was observed along the western and northwestern coast of Puerto Rico and in the northeastern coast of the Dominican Republic shortly after the earthquake. Eyewitnesses in Aguadilla and Mayagüez mentioned noticeable but modest sea-level disturbances, such as a coastal drawdown and small wave surges coming into town in Arecibo. Some flooding of low-lying coastal areas occurred in Aguadilla and Arecibo, but no major inundation or destruction like that seen in 1918. The estimated maximum tsunami wave heights were less than 1 meter (3 feet). The NOAA National Centers for Environmental Information (NCEI) tsunami database today confirms the 1943 event as a tsunamigenic earthquake but categorizes it as "minor" in terms of its effects.

=== Aftershocks ===
In total, 18 strong aftershocks were reported felt by people across Puerto Rico and the Dominican Republic in the 24 hours after the mainshock, the strongest of which was an approximate 6.0 M_{w} earthquake occurring 22 hours after the main event. In total, two aftershocks measuring more than 6.0 M_{w} are estimated to have occurred. Anecdotal reports describe people not being able to go back to sleep due to constant shaking of the ground throughout the night. The strongest aftershocks were reported at 01:39, 02:17, 03:10, 03:25 and 07:45. All of these were also measured by the Weston Observatory in Massachusetts.

== Damage ==
The most common direct report of physical damages to the infrastructure of the island were widespread and long-lasting power outages. Most of the significant damage reports were received from the northwestern municipalities of Mayagüez, Aguadilla and Añasco. Additional damages to roads and the electrical infrastructure were reported in Ponce and Caguas. No major loss of homes or properties were reported by the Puerto Rico Insular Police but several damages to infrastructure was reported. Some of the structural damages included several collapsed warehouses due to poor construction, and deterioration to several roads and bridges. The biggest and costliest damages of infrastructure occurred to the telegraph lines and to several sections of the rail system across western Puerto Rico. The Puerto Rico Telephone Company system also temporarily collapsed due to the overwhelming of the telephone network. None of the reported injuries were directly attributed to the earthquake but to accidents caused by the widespread panic caused by the event.

== See also ==
- Geology of Puerto Rico
- List of earthquakes in 1943
- List of earthquakes in the Caribbean
  - List of earthquakes in Puerto Rico and the Virgin Islands
