= 1943 Tottori earthquake =

1943 earthquake in Japan

Tottori earthquake
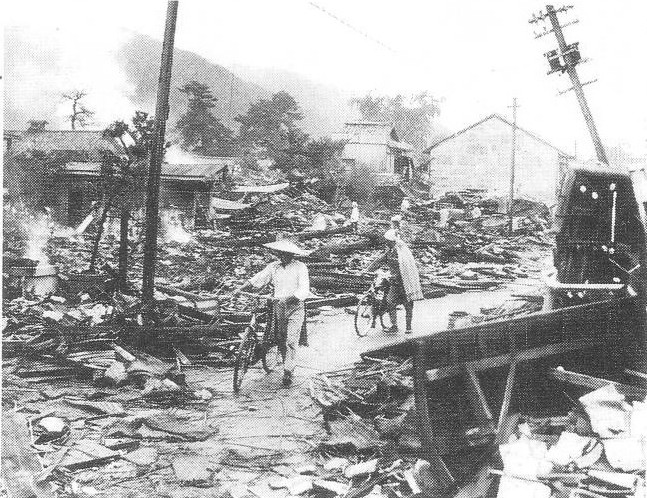

- Location within Tottori Prefecture
- UTC time: 1943-09-10 08:37:00
- ISC event: 899991
- USGS-ANSS: ComCat
- Local date: September 10, 1943
- Local time: 17:36 JST
- Magnitude: 7.0 M_{w}
- Epicenter: 35.47°N 134.09°E
- Areas affected: Japan
- Max. intensity: JMA 6 (legacy scale)
- Casualties: 1086

The Tottori earthquake (鳥取地震, Tottori jishin) occurred in Tottori prefecture, Japan at 17:36 local time on September 10, 1943. Although the earthquake occurred during World War II, information about the disaster was not censored, and relief volunteers and supplies came from many parts of the Empire of Japan, including Manchukuo.

The Tottori earthquake had its epicenter offshore from Ketaka District, now part of Tottori, and registered a magnitude of 7.0 on the moment magnitude scale and it originated from the Kashino-Yoshioka Fault system. The seismic intensity was recorded as 6 in Tottori city, and 5 as far away as Okayama on the Inland Sea. The center of Tottori city, with many antiquated buildings was the hardest hit, with an estimated 80% of its structures damaged or destroyed. As the earthquake struck in the evening when most kitchens had fires lit in preparation for the evening meal, fires broke out in 16 locations around the city. With water mains damaged, citizens formed bucket brigades to prevent fires from spreading. The number of fatalities was 1,083, including numerous Zainichi Koreans working in the nearby Aragane Copper Mines.

Two magnitude 6.2 earthquakes had occurred in the same area earlier that year on March 4 and 5, but did not cause significant damage.

== See also ==
- List of earthquakes in 1943
- List of earthquakes in Japan
