= List of earthquakes in Puerto Rico and the Virgin Islands =

Epicenters of notable earthquakes in Puerto Rico with year of occurrence

Puerto Rico and the Virgin Islands lie at the boundary between the Caribbean and North American plates, making these territories prone to earthquakes. This is a highly active seismic region both surrounded and traversed by numerous faults; to the north, the North American plate subducts beneath the Caribbean plate, while a number of strike-slip faults cross the main island of Puerto Rico diagonally from southeast to northwest. Puerto Rico and the Virgin Islands are also located on a microplate that is continuously being deformed by the subduction zone to the north. Puerto Rico is constantly at risk of experiencing major earthquakes, greater than 7.0.

== History ==
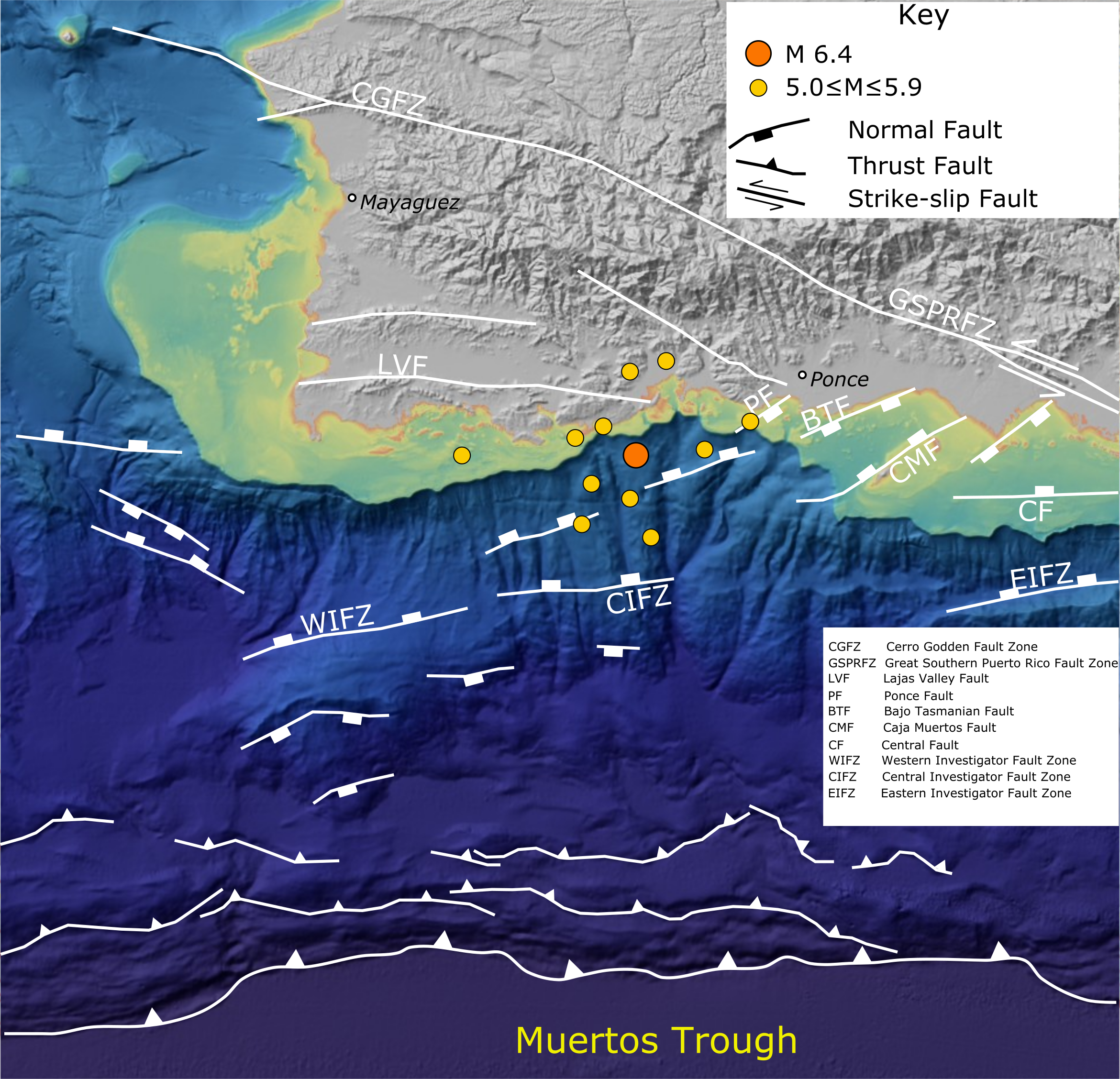
Map showing epicenters of M≥5 earthquakes up to February 4, 2020, in the 2019–2020 Puerto Rico swarm sequence of earthquakes.

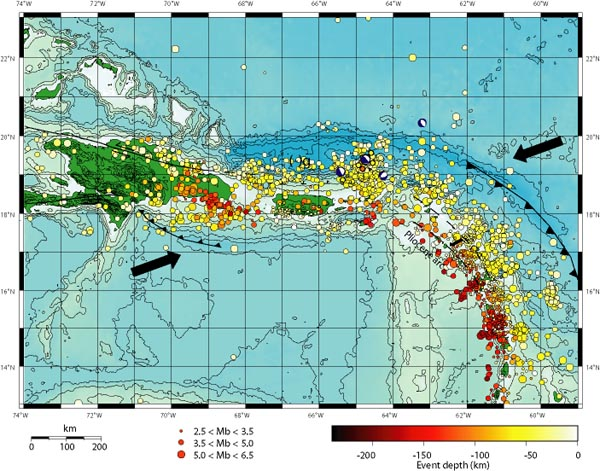
Map showing the epicenters of all the magnitude 5 and greater earthquakes in the eastern region of the Caribbean for the last 100 years. Filled circle color indicates depth and circle size indicates magnitude. The five biggest, most destructive, earthquakes of the last 250 years with magnitudes of 7 and greater are shown by stars.

The region has been seismically active since ancient times. The Great Northern and Great Southern fault zones that cross the main island of Puerto Rico laterally have been active since the Eocene epoch. Earthquakes in the region have been recorded since the early 17th century and some of the first seismic activity in the Americas were recorded first in Puerto Rico and Hispaniola. One of the first recorded earthquakes in the region was on September 8, 1615, which originated in the Dominican Republic region and caused damage throughout the island. Earthquakes have been studied and recorded in Puerto Rico since the 20th century. The Puerto Rico Seismic Network (Red Sísmica de Puerto Rico or RSPR), which is contained within the department of Geology of the University of Puerto Rico, Mayagüez, was established in 1974 by the United States Geological Survey (USGS) and the former Puerto Rico Electric Power Authority (PREPA). It was established with the goal evaluating seismic features for the purpose of building nuclear power plants in the region. Its mission today is to detect, process and study seismic activity within the Puerto Rico region. The RSPR operates 25 seismometers throughout Puerto Rico, the US Virgin Islands and the British Virgin Islands. Two of these seismometers are owned by the United States Army Corps of Engineers.

On average, there are about 5 earthquakes recorded per day and about 3 earthquakes with magnitude 5.0 higher recorded per year in the region. Given that most of the active faults are located at sea, most earthquakes in the region do not cause loss of life or significant damage, and significant destructive earthquakes that occur in Puerto Rico are rare. Most large earthquakes have historically occurred at sea which makes the area susceptible to destructive tsunamis. The last tsunami to cause significant damage in Puerto Rico was on October 11, 1918, which was generated by the 1918 Aguadilla earthquake. There have been more recent tsunami events, such as in 1946, which did not cause significant damage to the island. The last earthquakes to cause loss of life were the 2020 southwestern Puerto Rico sequence of earthquakes which caused 4 deaths. The last earthquake to cause significant damage and loss of life in the Virgin Islands occurred in 1867; this earthquake generated a tsunami that affected the Virgin Islands and Puerto Rico.

== Notable earthquakes in Puerto Rico and the Virgin Islands ==
Date	Name	Area	Mag.	MMI	Deaths	Injuries	Total damage / notes
1615-09-08	Hispaniola	Dominican Republic	7.5 M_{I}	–	–	–	One of the oldest recorded earthquakes in the Puerto Rico and Caribbean region. It affected Hispaniola and caused damage in Puerto Rico.
1670-08-15	Puerto Rico	Puerto Rico	–	–	–	–	Unknown epicenter, it caused damage in San Juan and San Germán, at the time the largest settlements in Puerto Rico.
1717-08-30	Puerto Rico	Puerto Rico	–	VII	–	–	Unknown epicenter, it destroyed Ponce's cathedral. The fact that it did not cause significant damage in Yauco, San Germán and Lajas suggests it was a small event localized close to Ponce.
1787-05-02	Puerto Rico	Puerto Rico Trench	*8.0–8.2 M_{w}	IX	–	–	Possibly the strongest earthquake to have hit Puerto Rico since the European colonization. It was strongly felt throughout the island and major damage was reported everywhere except for in the south (although there were minor damage in colonial buildings in Ponce). It destroyed several government buildings, parts of El Morro and other fortifications and walls in San Juan, the cathedral and colonial buildings in Arecibo, and historical buildings in Bayamón, Mayagüez and Toa Baja. *Contemporary research bestows the possibility that it was not a single 8.0 event but multiple earthquakes ranging from 6.4 to 7.3 M_{I}.
1844-04-16	Puerto Rico	Puerto Rico Trench	–	VIII	–	–	Major damage was recorded in Puerto Rico and Saint Thomas. It damaged most houses in San Juan.
1851-02-22	San Juan	Puerto Rico Trench	–	–	–	–	It caused damage in San Juan's city hall.
1855-12-14	Salinas	Puerto Rico	–	VI	–	–	Said to be the strongest earthquake to have hit Salinas since the town's founding where it caused minor localized damage. It was also felt in Aguas Buenas.
1860-10-23	Mayagüez	Puerto Rico	–	VII	–	–	Felt strongly in Mayagüez where it caused damage.
1865-05-12	Saint Thomas	Virgin Islands	–	–	–	–	Strong doublet earthquakes that hit the Virgin Islands and caused damage in Saint Thomas.
1865-08-30	Puerto Rico	Puerto Rico	–	VI	–	–	Its epicenter was most likely located deep on land in the Central Mountain Ranges region of Puerto Rico. It caused damage in Ponce and Manatí.
1867-11-18	Virgin Islands	Virgin Islands	7.5 M_{s}	IX	40+	–	It produced a tsunami that affected the Virgin Islands and Puerto Rico.
1868-03-17	Virgin Islands	Virgin Islands	6.5 M_{s}	–	–	–	
1874-08-26	Puerto Rico	Puerto Rico Trench	–	VI	–	–	It destroyed several houses and buildings in San Juan.
1875-12-08	Arecibo	Puerto Rico Trench	–	VIII	–	–	It caused significant damage in Arecibo and was strongly felt in Ponce.
1890-08-15	Puerto Rico	Puerto Rico	–	–	–	–	It was felt throughout the island and caused damage in Arecibo and Ponce.
1902-05-13	Virgin Islands	Virgin Islands	–	VI	–	–	Felt strongly in Saint Thomas.
1906-09-27	Puerto Rico	Puerto Rico	–	VI	–	–	Felt strongly throughout Puerto Rico and as far as the Dominican Republic and Saint Thomas. Only damage in San Juan was reported, where it caused fissures in the cathedral walls.
1906-10-20	Puerto Rico	Puerto Rico	–	VI	–	–	Felt throughout the island. Possibly an aftershock to the September 27 event.
1908-08-04	Puerto Rico	Puerto Rico	–	VI	–	–	Doublet earthquakes felt throughout Puerto Rico. Damage was reported in Arecibo, Ponce, San Germán and Yauco.
1909-02-17	Virgin Islands	Virgin Islands	–	VI	–	–	Felt in Puerto Rico and the Virgin Islands. Minor damage reported in Culebra and Saint Thomas.
1915-10-11	Puerto Rico	Puerto Rico	6.4 M_{w}	VI	–	–	Felt strongly in northwestern Puerto Rico, particularly Aguadilla and Isabela, but no major damage or injuries reported.
1917-07-27	Quebradillas	Puerto Rico	6.0 M_{w}	–	–	–	
1918-10-11	Puerto Rico	Mona Passage	7.1 M_{w}	IX	118	–	$4–29 million USD in damage. Damage and injuries were reported throughout the island. Several aftershocks were registered after the main shock, particularly a 6.5 aftershock that occurred the following year. Aftershocks are not included on this list.
1920-02-10	Aguadilla	Mona Passage	6.4 M_{w}	VI	–	–	Felt throughout Puerto Rico and the Dominican Republic but no deaths or injuries were reported.
1943-07-29	Puerto Rico	Mona Passage	7.7 M_{w}	VI	–	–	It was felt throughout Puerto Rico but no deaths or injuries were reported. Detected on seismographs in New York, Boston and as far as Europe. Minor damages were reported across the island. Numerous aftershocks, including two large ones over 6.0 M_{w} occurred the following dates, not included on this list.
1946-08-04	Dominican Republic	Dominican Republic	8.1 M_{s}	IX	*2,550	–	Large earthquake centered in the Samaná Peninsula of the Dominican Republic. *All deaths occurred in the Dominican Republic. No deaths or injuries was reported in Puerto Rico. Localized damaged was however reported throughout the island. A small tsunami was recorded in Mayagüez, Aguadilla and as far away in San Juan and even Daytona Beach, FL and Atlantic City, NJ. This is the largest earthquake to have hit the Caribbean region in the 20th century. It was followed by numerous aftershocks, the largest being 7.4 registered 4 days after the main shock.
1966-11-03	Punta Cana	Mona Passage	6.0 M_{w}	–	–	–	Felt in northwestern Puerto Rico.
1970-07-08	Saint Croix	Virgin Islands	6.1 M_{w}	IV	–	–	Felt across Puerto Rico and the Virgin Islands. Minor damages in St. Thomas and St. Croix.
1979-03-23	Dominican Republic	Mona Passage	6.1 M_{w}	VI	–	–	Felt throughout the Dominican Republic, Haiti and Puerto Rico, and even as far away as Colombia.
1981-08-24	Puerto Rico	Mona Passage	5.7 M_{w}	–	–	–	Felt throughout the island. Minor damage in Guayanilla.
1988-11-03	Quebradillas	Puerto Rico Trench	6.0 M_{w}	IV	–	–	Felt across Puerto Rico. No damages or injuries reported.
2001-10-17	Charlotte Amalie	Virgin Islands	6.0 M_{w}	IV	–	–	Earthquake swarm.
2008-10-11	Charlotte Amalie	Virgin Islands	6.1 M_{w}	V	–	–	Felt in Puerto Rico, the US and British Virgin Islands.
2010-05-16	Moca	Puerto Rico	5.8 M_{w}	VI	–	–	Felt throughout Puerto Rico, the Dominican Republic, and the US and British Islands. It is colloquially known as the 2010 Moca earthquake. It caused minor damage in the western and northwestern regions of Puerto Rico, and a minor landslide that affected a portion of PR-111. It is the largest Puerto Rican earthquake to have occurred on land in recent times.
2010-12-24	Aguas Buenas	Puerto Rico	5.1 M_{w}	V	–	–	Felt throughout Puerto Rico and the US Virgin Islands. It is colloquially known as the 2010 Aguas Buenas earthquake or the "2010 Nochebuena earthquake" (2010 Christmas Eve earthquake). It caused minor damage throughout the island and localized power outages throughout the Caguas and San Juan regions. It is the largest earthquake to directly hit the San Juan Metropolitan region in recent times.
2011-12-17	Rincón	Puerto Rico	5.2 M_{w}	VI	–	–	Doublet earthquakes (5.2 and 5.1).
2014-01-13	Hatillo	Puerto Rico Trench	6.4 M_{w}	V	–	–	Felt throughout Puerto Rico.
2019-03-12	Guayama	Puerto Rico	4.6 M_{w}	V	–	1	Felt throughout Puerto Rico. Localized minor damage in Guayama. It was followed by several aftershocks including a 4.1 which was the largest.
2019-09-24	Quebradillas	Mona Passage	6.0 M_{w}	V	–	–	Felt throughout Puerto Rico and the Dominican Republic. It produced several aftershocks of which the September 26 one was the largest (5.1) and also resulted in minor localized damage.
2019-12-28	Guánica	Puerto Rico	4.7 M_{w}	V	–	–	First notable temblor in the earthquake swarm sequence of shocks that affected the southwestern portion of Puerto Rico from December 2019 throughout 2020.
2020-01-06	Guayanilla	Puerto Rico	5.8 M_{w}	VI	–	–	Foreshock of the January 7th earthquake, destroyed Punta Ventana and greatly affected Guayanilla causing significant damage there and in nearby municipalities.
2020-01-07	Guayanilla	Puerto Rico	6.4 M_{w}	VIII	4	9	Strongest in the earthquake swarm sequence of shocks that affected the southwestern portion of Puerto Rico from December 2019 throughout 2020. It caused significant damage and power outages throughout the island. Fourteen aftershocks above 5.0 M_{w}, not included on this list.
2023-04-09	Guánica	Puerto Rico	4.5 M_{w}	V	–	–	Strong aftershock of the 2019–2020 sequence, felt strongly throughout Puerto Rico.
2023-12-09	Cruz Bay	Virgin Islands	5.7 M_{w}	V	–	–	Felt throughout the British and U.S. Virgin Islands and eastern Puerto Rico.
2024-05-15	Aguadilla	Puerto Rico Trench	5.6 M_{w}	V	–	–	Felt widely throughout Puerto Rico and Punta Cana in the Dominican Republic.
2025-02-25	Punta Cana	Dominican Republic	5.9 M_{w}	VI	–	–	Felt strongly in the Dominican Republic and western Puerto Rico. Reports of minor damage in Punta Cana and the western Dominican Republic.
2025-05-04	Cruz Bay	Virgin Islands	5.6 M_{w}	V	–	–	Felt throughout the British and U.S. Virgin Islands and eastern Puerto Rico.
2025-06-24	Punta Cana	Dominican Republic	5.7 M_{w}	VI	–	–	Felt widely throughout the Dominican Republic, Puerto Rico and the U.S. Virgin Islands. Minor damage reported in Moca and Lares in western Puerto Rico.
2025-08-05	Dominican Republic	Dominican Republic	5.7 M_{w}	VI	–	–	Felt widely through the Dominican Republic and Puerto Rico.
2026-09-18	Guánica	Puerto Rico	4.8 M_{w}	VI	–	–	Felt throughout southwestern Puerto Rico. Hairline cracks reported in Guánica and Lajas.

== See also ==
- Geology of Puerto Rico
- List of earthquakes in the Caribbean
- Lists of earthquakes
- United States Geological Survey (USGS)
