= 1943 Adapazarı–Hendek earthquake =

Earthquake in Turkey

- Location within Turkey
- UTC time: 1943-06-20 15:32:53
- ISC event: 899896
- USGS-ANSS: ComCat
- Local date: 20 June 1943
- Local time: 17:32
- Magnitude: 6.6 M_{s}
- Epicenter: 40.6°N 30.5°E
- Areas affected: Turkey
- Max. intensity: MMI IX (Violent)
- Casualties: 336

The 1943 Adapazarı–Hendek earthquake occurred at 17:32 local time on 20 June in Sakarya Province, Turkey. It registered 6.6 on the surface-wave magnitude scale with a maximum intensity of IX (Violent) on the Mercalli intensity scale.

== See also ==
- List of earthquakes in 1943
- List of earthquakes in Turkey
