= 1843 Guadeloupe earthquake =

Earthquake affecting the Caribbean

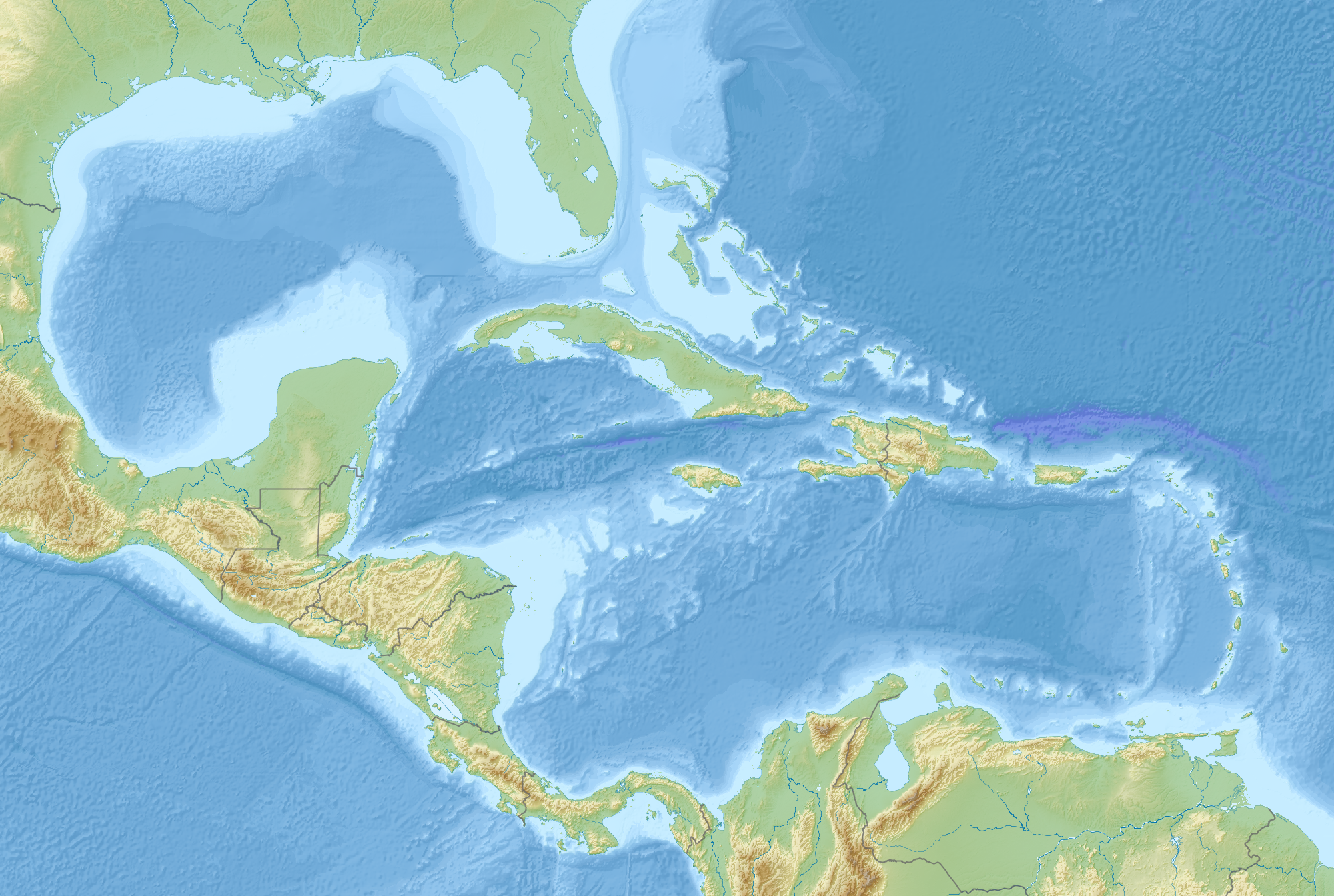
- Location within Middle America
- USGS-ANSS: ComCat
- Local date: 8 February 1843
- Local time: 10:37 AM
- Magnitude: 8.5 M_{uk} (est.)
- Epicenter: 16.5°N 62.2°W
- Max. intensity: MMI IX (Violent)
- Tsunami: 1.2 meters
- Casualties: 1,500–5,000

The 1843 Guadeloupe earthquake occurred at 10:37 local time on 8 February in the island of Guadeloupe in the Lesser Antilles. It had an estimated magnitude (scale unspecified) of 8.5, making it the strongest recorded earthquake in the Caribbean and a maximum perceived intensity of shaking of IX on the Mercalli intensity scale. The earthquake was felt widely throughout the Caribbean and as far away as New York. Around 1,500 to 5,000 people were killed.

== Tectonic setting ==
The Lesser Antilles are an island arc formed above the destructive plate boundary where the North American plate is being subducted beneath the Caribbean plate at a rate of about 2 cm per year. Historical earthquakes in this region include large megathrust earthquakes on the plate interface, such as those in 1839 and 1843, and smaller intraplate earthquakes within the arc itself, associated with oblique convergence on the plate boundary.

== Earthquake ==
The magnitude of this megathrust earthquake was calculated in the range 7.5–8.0 by Bernard & Lambert in 1988. This was reassessed in 2011 by Feuillet and others, giving an 8.5 magnitude. Later work by Hough in 2013, taking account of reports of the earthquake from the US, supported a magnitude of at least 8.5 for this event.

== Damage ==
In Guadeloupe, Pointe-à-Pitre suffered severe damage with a maximum of 8–900 houses being destroyed of the 1,222 that existed before the earthquake. The earthquake was quickly followed by fires that caused further destruction.

The island of Antigua was also badly affected, with all churches and mills throughout the island reported destroyed. Forty deaths were reported. Damage was also reported from Montserrat, with six casualties.

== Tsunami ==
On Antigua, a rise in sea level by 1.2 meters was interpreted as run-up from the tsunami triggered by the quake. A wharf on the southeast part of the island sank and took on an "undulating appearance".

== See also ==
- List of historical earthquakes
- List of earthquakes in the Caribbean
