= 1943 Tosya–Ladik earthquake =

Deadly earthquake in Turkey

- Location within Turkey
- UTC time: 1943-11-26 22:20:48
- ISC event: 900102
- USGS-ANSS: ComCat
- Local date: 27 November 1943
- Local time: 01:20:48
- Duration: 4 minutes
- Magnitude: 7.5–7.7 M_{w}
- Depth: 20 km (12 mi)
- Epicenter: 40.87°N 33.65°E
- Fault: North Anatolian Fault
- Type: Strike-slip
- Areas affected: Turkey
- Max. intensity: MSK-64 XI (Catastrophic)
- Casualties: 2,824–5,000 dead 5,000 injuries

The 1943 Tosya–Ladik earthquake occurred at 01:20 local time on 27 November, near Tosya, Kastamonu Province, in northern Turkey. The earthquake had an estimated moment magnitude of 7.5–7.7 and a maximum felt intensity of XI (Catastrophic) on the MSK-64 scale. Its effects were observed for over 45,000 km^{2}. The earthquake was felt in Trabzon, Isparta, Elazığ, Zonguldak and Yozgat. Damage was seen in Kastamonu, Çankırı, Çorum, Amasya, Samsun, Tokat, Sinop and Ordu. As a result of the earthquake, more than 2,500 were killed and 5,000 were injured.

== Tectonic setting ==
The Anatolian Plate is a small piece of continental plate that is turning counter-clockwise as it heads westward comparative to the Eurasian plate on the north. The deformation of the plate is facilitated by three important tectonic forces relative to a stable Eurasian plate: one being the pushing force done by the Arabian plate below which is heading northward, one being the opposite, pulling force done by the extension in the western part of the plate related to the back-arc extension related with the Hellenic subduction zone, and one being a dragging force done on the Anatolian Plate from the lithosphere under. The southeastern side of the Anatolian Plate is bordered by the East Anatolian Fault, which is home to most of the left-lateral strike-slip displacement on this side of the tectonic plate.

The earthquake occurred on the North Anatolian Fault, which is a fault line around 1500 km long, right-lateral, strike-slip plate boundary fault between the Eurasian plate and the Anatolian Plate that travels across the northern section of Turkey. Large earthquakes measuring 7+ magnitudes on the North Anatolian fault in the 1900s have ruptured in a migrating sequence from the east towards the west. This pattern indicates a rather strong relation between the fault ruptures and an increased risk of rupture on bordering sections of the fault. Due the latest earthquake in the migrating sequence occurring at the eastern edge of the Marmara Sea, at Izmit, the possible westward continuity of the pattern involves a very important and likely deadly hazard to one of the most populous cities in the world, Istanbul. The migrating large quake pattern suggests that the North Anatolian fault responds to built up stress on the fault by triggering a pulse of strain on a bordering unruptured fault section which drops the strain after exceedance of stress limits. By determining the timing of these earthquakes on the fault, the understanding of these processes resulting in fault rupture can be enhanced. A long, historical record of many surface rupturing earthquakes on this fault documents extensive and destructive damage and casualties on the North Anatolian Fault. The historical records provide precise time-related constraints on many earthquakes over the past 2,000 years. Increasing numbers of paleo-seismic investigations have been undertaken on the fault, and these investigations and studies suggest that the earthquake record is not complete, particularly in the central areas of the fault. Additionally, the record of historical earthquakes provide little spatial constraint on the places that have had a surface rupture.

== Earthquake ==
The earthquake reportedly struck during a cloudy and rainy night, and first started with light shaking which intensified and lasted for around 4 minutes. The residents near the epicenter were awakened by the sound of thunder and humming and saw that they were shaking like a cradle. Shortly after the earthquake the local residents woke up and raced into the streets to see what was going on.

The Tosya-Ladik earthquake ruptured a 280-km-long segment of the North Anatolian fault, from the district of Ilgaz in Çankırı province all the way to Ladik in the Samsun province. The scarps caused by the rupture also had slip of 2-3 meters in some places.

== Impact ==
The damage and impacts from the earthquake were widespread, however most of the damage was found in the Kastamonu Province. There, following the earthquake, the government house, Administration of Liquors, an old Halkevleri building, Gazipasa School, a branch of Ziraat Bank, Republic Elementary School, Nasrullah Mosque, other mosques and other workshops were damaged with cracks in Kastamonu. Between these buildings, the Administration of Liquors was damaged the most, with its interior structure being severely damaged along with dangerous cracks on walls. However, no casualties were caused in the liquor warehouse. The building was later visited by the management, which they inspected the building and later revealed that only the tobacco warehouse would be operational and be benefited from. Another building that was damaged was the Nasrullah Mosque, which had a lot of small cracks including the dome, was closed for operation, only to be reopened later after an inspection from architects from Ankara. The Gazipasa School was heavily damaged as well. The roof of the school collapsed and very deep cracks were observed on the top floor of the school. Other than that, the Kastamonu Castle was damaged and 62 nearby homes were evacuated by the order of the local police department. In the next few days, the Kastamonu Municipality ordered some experts to review the castle, who decided to repair the castle. To do that, 20,000 lira was requested. Along with the damage, landslides occurred near the city center which some damaged homes and killed a few people.

Among other neighborhoods in the Kastamonu area, many had collapsed walls. 8 buildings were flattened, and 110 buildings were damaged, which also included some official buildings. 62 other homes were evacuated due to the fear of collapsing. In smaller villages, 143 buildings were flattened and 269 homes were damaged. The Golkoy Institute's 2nd building, which was home to 1,000 students, was also damaged.

In Kastamonu's Daday, Küre and Inebolu districts, the earthquake was felt, however no damage was caused nor mentioned whatsoever. In the Araç district however, damage was observed. In villages within the district, 39 homes were destroyed and 4 other homes were damaged. Areas of the Taşköprü district was also affected. 2 villages were completely left in ruins and in 9 other villages 54 homes were destroyed. Many casualties were reported. Right after the earthquake, a fire blazed out in the district. Along with the heavy damage in villages, a mosque's minaret also collapsed in the Taşköprü city center as well as some shops. Most of the damage in the district was in the part bordering the Tosya district. In the Kargı district of Çorum, transportation was restricted since roads and bridges to Tosya were severely damaged. Along with that, the telegraph line between Kastamonu, Tosya and Kargı was severely damaged and was closed down. Due to this, the Kastamonu city center was not able be informed of the disaster instantly. 8 hours after the earthquake, the line was fixed and operational.

Since the epicenter was in Tosya and the houses there were not very stable, the most damage was observed there and most of the district turned into piles of rubble. The earthquake had a very significant effect in villages near the point where the Devrez Stream connects into the Kızılırmak River. More than 100 houses were flattened in the villages there, and in other surrounding villages severe damage was done to buildings and homes. In the district's city center, havoc was caused in 7 neighborhoods, and barely any homes were left standing. Other than homes, official and public institution buildings were also damaged. An electrical power plant, a paddy processing factory, a community centre, a military recruitment office, the police department, Ulu Mosque, Abdurrahman Mosque, Pazar and Ahmetaga Mosques were completely left in ruins of debris and the 370-year old Yeni Mosque was heavily damaged, but despite the majority of the mosque's structure being damaged to a level of not being able to be used, it was left standing.

=== Destroyed buildings ===
A week after the earthquake, according to the information given by the newspaper Doğrusöz, in Kastamonu and in surrounding areas an estimated 3,709 buildings were destroyed, 2,705 buildings were left uninhabitable. According to the latest figures, in the surroundings of Kastamonu (which includes Tosya and Kargı) 6,534 buildings were completely destroyed and 1,172 buildings were almost destroyed.

=== Casualties ===
Many casualties were reported, with Tosya having most of them. 2 days after the earthquake, the casualty figure was 577 with around 300 injured, as announced by an official in the Grand National Assembly of Turkey. In the following days, the Birlik newspaper announced that there were 617 casualties. On 13 December 1943, the numbers were reported at 1,071 dead with 1,293 injured by the Health and Social Support Minister in the Grand National Assembly.

In the next few decades, a variety of casualty estimates were provided for this event. The United States' National Geophysical Data Center's significant earthquake database and the USGS' PAGER loss estimate database both list 4,020 fatalities, while the Belgian Centre for Research on the Epidemiology of Disasters' EM-DAT database, and Kubat et al. 2008 show 2,824. Utsu 2002 lists 4,020 as its primary entry while also acknowledging estimates of 2,824 and 5,000.

== Response ==
As a result of the earthquake and the damage, the Tosya district governor instantly took control of the incident and started rescue operations. The local government there served the victims with food and temporary tents for housing. Before winter came, both Tosya and Kargı's governing body started the construction of a barrack and also requested 25,000 liras for recovery efforts. In the next few days, more barracks were built for affected foreign civil servants. The Ministry of Public Works sent over an architect as well as some other engineers from Kastamonu to inspect the destroyed and damaged buildings in the area as well as a team of electric engineers to fix the electricity grid of the area. 15 days after the destructive quake, the power of Tosya and nearby areas were restored. Meanwhile, since the governor was in Ankara, the vice-governor of Kastamonu, the local gendarmerie commander, the mayor of Tosya and the chief constable visited the area and surveyed the damage. After a few days, the governor returned to Kastamonu, checked the damage in the surrounding buildings, consulted the injured at the hospital and then later visited Tosya. After taking care of the victims there for a week, he later moved to Kargı. Meanwhile, 2 members of the parliament representing Kastamonu visited the city as well as a representative of the Ministry of Agriculture. In the following days and weeks, more officials visited the victims and the area that got struck.

A month later, the Turkish Government in Ankara invited the governors in the affected areas for a meeting. In the meeting, they agreed to rebuild damaged villages, recover from all damage and losses as soon as possible, rebuild official buildings, provide farmers and other civilians with the necessary equipment and seeds, to prepare the construction commissions and begin the reconstruction of buildings that are earthquake-resistant in spring and manage earthquake-related laws accordingly. Separately, in provinces that were further out which were also damaged, wood from the state forests were distributed out to the public for free.

Money, food and other necessary materials were also supplied. The Turkish Red Crescent and the Kastamonu Municipality supplied doctors, medicines and food such as bread, cheese, olives and halva. Over the next weeks and months, more official departments and municipalities donated construction material, food, farming material and health-related support to the provinces that got affected by the earthquake.

== See also ==
- 1942 Niksar–Erbaa earthquake
- List of earthquakes in 1943
- List of earthquakes in Turkey
