= 2010 Moca earthquake =

Earthquake in Moca, Puerto Rico

- Location within Puerto Rico
- UTC time: 2010-05-16 05:16:10
- ISC event
- USGS-ANSS: ComCat
- Local date: May 16, 2010
- Local time: 01:16:10
- Magnitude: M_{w} 5.8
- Depth: 113.0 km (70 mi)
- Epicenter: 18.400°N 67.070°W
- Fault: Cerro Goden fault zone (CGfz)
- Type: Strike-slip
- Areas affected: Puerto Rico
- Total damage: Limited, localized.
- Max. intensity: MMI VI (Strong)
- Tsunami: None
- Casualties: None

The 2010 Moca earthquake, also referred to as the 2010 Puerto Rico earthquake (Spanish: temblor de Puerto Rico de 2010), occurred on May 16 at 1:16 a.m. local time in Moca, Puerto Rico. The earthquake measured 5.8 on the moment magnitude scale and had a maximum Mercalli intensity of VI (Strong). This was the largest earthquake to strike Puerto Rico since the 1943 Puerto Rico earthquake which measured 7.7 on the Richter scale. This was also the first moderate to major earthquake in recorded history to originate on land in Puerto Rico, as earthquakes in the region usually have their epicenter in the ocean; another earthquake with an epicenter on land (in Aguas Buenas) would occur later in December of the same year.

== Earthquake ==
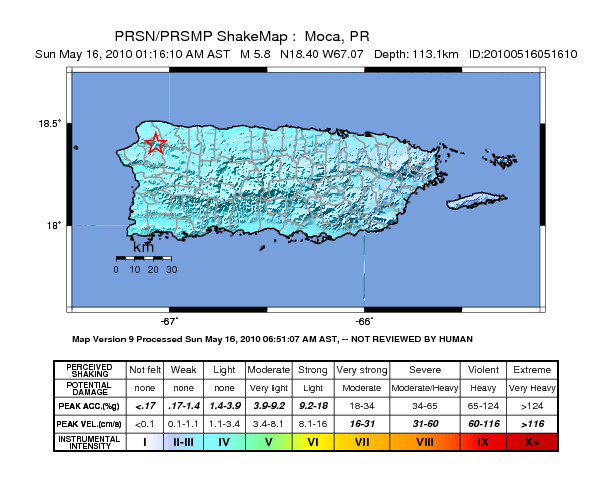
USGS ShakeMap of the 2010 Moca earthquake.

The shock originated in or around the Cerro Goden fault zone (CGfz) which partially transverses Puerto Rico diagonally from northwest in Aguadilla and the Mona Passage to the southwest in Ponce. The epicenter was located about 4 miles east of Moca Pueblo in the Rocha barrio of the municipality, about 60 miles west of San Juan. Even if the earthquake was moderate in size it was felt by most, as its epicenter occurred on land.

According to the Puerto Rico Seismic Network, the strongest shaking was felt in Moca, Añasco, Hormigueros, Lares, Ponce and Salinas. Shaking was felt throughout the island of Puerto Rico, the island municipalities of Vieques and Culebra, the United States Virgin Islands and the Dominican Republic. At least one aftershock occurred after the main shock measuring 3.2 on the Richter scale.

Other smaller earthquakes which were originally reported as aftershocks were in fact unrelated to this event as they occurred in a different fault zone in the Virgin Islands Platform. As the earthquake occurred on land and was smaller than 6.5 in scale it did not present any risk for generating a tsunami.

=== Damage ===
Landslides were reported across the mountainous regions of the island, and a major landslide occurred between the municipalities of Lares and Utuado which affected Highway PR-111. There were additional reports of damage in buildings and other structures in the municipalities of Vega Baja and Florida. Cracks also appeared in a few buildings in the towns of Florida, Lares, Moca, and Vega Baja, according to Puerto Rico's emergency management agency. The earthquake caused tall buildings in San Juan to sway and some homes in Utuado were reported to have shifted about four inches off their foundations.

== See also ==
- List of earthquakes in 2010
- List of earthquakes in Puerto Rico
- 2010 Aguas Buenas earthquake
- 1918 San Fermín earthquake
