= 2003 Dominican Republic earthquake =

Natural disaster in the Dominican Republic

- Location within the Dominican Republic
- UTC time: 2003-09-22 04:45:36
- ISC event: 7131995
- USGS-ANSS: ComCat
- Local date: September 22, 2003
- Local time: 00:45:37
- Magnitude: 6.4 M_{w}
- Depth: 14 km (9 mi)
- Epicenter: 19.72°N 70.69°W
- Type: Thrust
- Areas affected: Dominican Republic
- Max. intensity: MMI X (Extreme)
- Aftershocks: 5.6 M_{w} Sept 22 at 05:30
- Casualties: 3 dead, dozens injured

The 2003 Dominican Republic earthquake occurred on September 22 at 00:45:37 local time with a moment magnitude of 6.4 and a maximum Mercalli intensity of X (Extreme).

== Earthquake ==
The shock occurred on the northern coast of the Dominican Republic near the town of Luperon, Puerto Plata and 40 miles (64 km) north of the city of Santiago de los Caballeros. This earthquake could also be felt in Port-au-Prince, Haiti and western Puerto Rico. Research indicated that it was one of a series of westward-propagating earthquakes along the boundary between the North American plate and the Caribbean plate.

== Damage and casualties ==
The tremor damaged many buildings across the city of Puerto Plata, the city closest to the epicenter, including two schools. There, a wall collapsed caused vehicular traffic and schools were damaged. In Santiago, several schools were damaged and the airport there was temporarily closed, but was made operational again afterwards. Two hospitals there were evacuated but there was no structural damage and the patients were able to go back indoors. In Nagua, schools were damaged in the form of cracks and walls and floors, and a roof of a local hospital collapsed. In the towns of San Cristobal and Cotui, light damage to schools was reported. It caused three fatalities, two of which suffered heart attacks. Dozens were also injured.

== See also ==
- Gonâve microplate
- List of earthquakes in 2003
- List of earthquakes in the Dominican Republic
- List of earthquakes in the Caribbean
- Septentrional-Oriente fault zone
