= 1943 Central Java earthquake =

Earthquake in Indonesia

- Location within Java Location within Indonesia
- UTC time: 1943-07-23 14:53:09
- ISC event: 899940
- USGS-ANSS: ComCat
- Local date: July 23, 1943
- Local time: 21:43
- Magnitude: 7.4 M_{w}
- Depth: 60 km (37 mi)
- Epicenter: 8.59°S 109.80°E
- Areas affected: Indonesia
- Max. intensity: MMI VIII (Severe)
- Casualties: 213 killed

The 1943 Central Java earthquake occurred on July 23 at 14:53:10 UTC with a moment magnitude of 7.4 near Java, which was under Japanese occupation. At least 213 people were killed.

== Tectonic setting ==
The Yogyakarta depression area is mostly covered by alluvium and the volcanic deposit of Mount Merapi. The Yogyakarta depression area is located between the volcanic arc of the Central Java and the Java Trench.

== Earthquake ==
The earthquake affected the Yogyakarta depression area in Central Java. It caused about 213 deaths and over 3,900 injuries. More than 12,600 houses collapsed. This earthquake caused damage in Central Java from Garut in the west to Surakarta in the east. In Bantul alone, there were 31 people dead, 564 people injured, and 2,682 houses collapsed.

== See also ==
- List of earthquakes in 1943
- List of earthquakes in Indonesia
