= 1943 Ovalle earthquake =

Earthquake in Coquimbo, Chile

- Location within South America
- UTC time: 1943-04-06 16:07:17
- ISC event: 899789
- USGS-ANSS: ComCat
- Local date: 6 April 1943
- Local time: 12:07
- Duration: ~25 seconds
- Magnitude: 7.9–8.2 M_{w}
- Depth: 35 km (22 mi)
- Epicenter: 31.432°S 71.475°W
- Areas affected: Chile, Coquimbo Region
- Max. intensity: MSK-64 VIII (Damaging)
- Tsunami: yes
- Casualties: 11 dead

The Coquimbo Region of Chile was affected by a major earthquake on 6 April 1943 at 12:07 local time (16:07 UTC). It had a magnitude of between 7.9 and 8.2 on the moment magnitude scale. It triggered a minor tsunami that caused local damage along the coast. A total of 11 people were killed, including a group of five miners.

== Tectonic setting ==
Central Chile lies above the destructive plate boundary where the Nazca plate subducts beneath the South American plate. There have been many large earthquakes caused by rupture along the plate interface. Illapel has been struck by major earthquakes in 1730, 1880, 1943 and 2015.

== Damage ==
The earthquake caused major damage to Ovalle, Illapel, Salamanca and Combarbala. At the La Cocinera copper mine near Ovalle, a tailings dam collapsed, killing five miners.
