= Time in Antigua and Barbuda =

Antigua and Barbuda Time (AST) is the official time in Antigua and Barbuda. It is four hours behind Coordinated Universal Time (UTC−04:00). Antigua and Barbuda has only one time zone and does not observe daylight saving time.

== IANA time zone database ==
In the IANA time zone database Antigua and Barbuda has the following time zone:

- America/Antigua (AG)
