= 2010 Aguas Buenas earthquake =

Christmas Eve earthquake in Aguas Buenas, Puerto Rico

- Location within Puerto Rico
- UTC time: 2010-12-24 23:43:44
- USGS-ANSS: ComCat
- Local date: December 24, 2010
- Local time: 19:43:44
- Magnitude: M_{w} 5.1 M_{L} 5.4
- Depth: 63.9 miles (102.9 km)
- Epicenter: 18.260°N 66.135°W
- Fault: Great Northern Puerto Rico fault zone (GNPRfz)
- Type: Strike-slip
- Areas affected: Puerto Rico
- Total damage: Limited, localized.
- Max. intensity: MMI VI (Strong)
- Casualties: None

The 2010 Aguas Buenas earthquake, also referred to as the 2010 Christmas Eve earthquake (Spanish: Temblor de Nochebuena de 2010), occurred on December 24 at 7:43 p.m. local time in Aguas Buenas, Puerto Rico. It measured 5.1 on the moment magnitude scale and had a maximum Mercalli intensity of VI (Strong). The event was the largest in Puerto Rico since May 16th of the same year, and the largest to impact the San Juan metropolitan area since 1975. The earthquake was felt throughout the island of Puerto Rico, the island municipalities of Vieques and Culebra, the American and British Virgin Islands, and even in the Dominican Republic across the Mona Passage.

== Earthquake ==
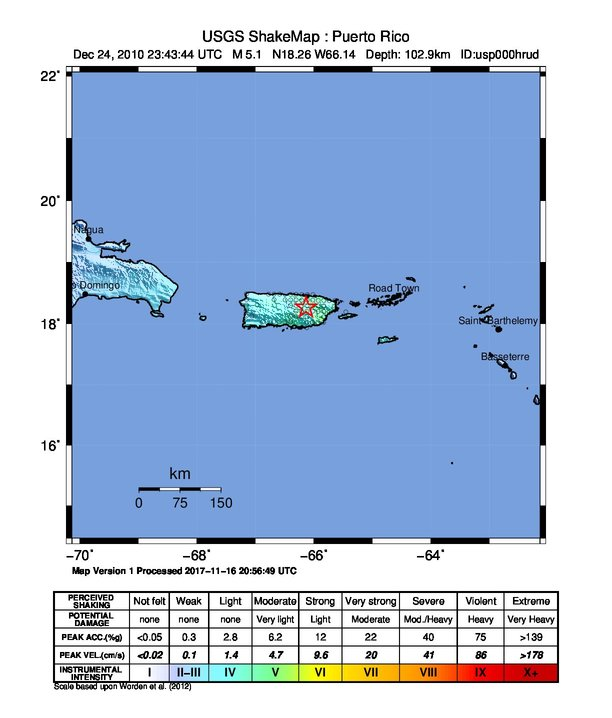
USGS ShakeMap of the 2010 Aguas Buenas earthquake.

The shock originated in the Great Northern Puerto Rico fault zone (GNPRfz) in the central eastern mountainous region of the island between the Juan Asencio and Sonadora barrios of Aguas Buenas, about 7 miles (11 km) from Caguas and 14 miles (23 km) from San Juan. This fault zone is located in the boundary between the North American and Caribbean plate tectonics, on a complex geologic zone with both subduction and strike faults. It was initially reported as measuring 5.4 on the Richter magnitude scale. The main shock was followed by two aftershocks (4.8 and 4.7) about 30 minutes after. Given its moderate size and its epicenter being located on land, the earthquake did not cause any tsunami. The strongest shaking was felt in the municipalities of Aguas Buenas, Bayamón, San Lorenzo and Caguas, and moderate to strong shaking was felt throughout the San Juan metropolitan area. There were more than 4,000 initial entries on the USGS and the Puerto Rico Seismic Network "Did you feel it? reports".

The earthquake was felt by most due to its epicenter on land close to some of the major urban areas of Puerto Rico and the fact that it hit during Christmas Eve celebrations when people are usually gathered in large family groups, often indoors or attending church services. There were more than 50 emergency calls in Bayamón and Guaynabo.

=== Damage ===
The earthquake was widely felt throughout Puerto Rico and the United States Virgin Islands. There were initial reports of limited localized damages throughout the island, particularly in the municipalities of Adjuntas, Aguas Buenas, Arecibo, Arroyo, Ceiba, Coamo, Fajardo, Humacao, Juncos, Las Marías, Las Piedras, Mayagüez, Naranjito, Patillas, Salinas and San Lorenzo. There were reports of power outages in Aguas Buenas and Caguas. There were no deaths or major damages and there were no reports of life-threatening injuries.

== See also ==
- List of earthquakes in 2010
- List of earthquakes in Puerto Rico
- 2010 Moca earthquake
- 1918 Puerto Rico earthquake
