= 1946 Dominican Republic earthquake =

8.1 magnitude scale earthquake and tsunami near Dominican Republic

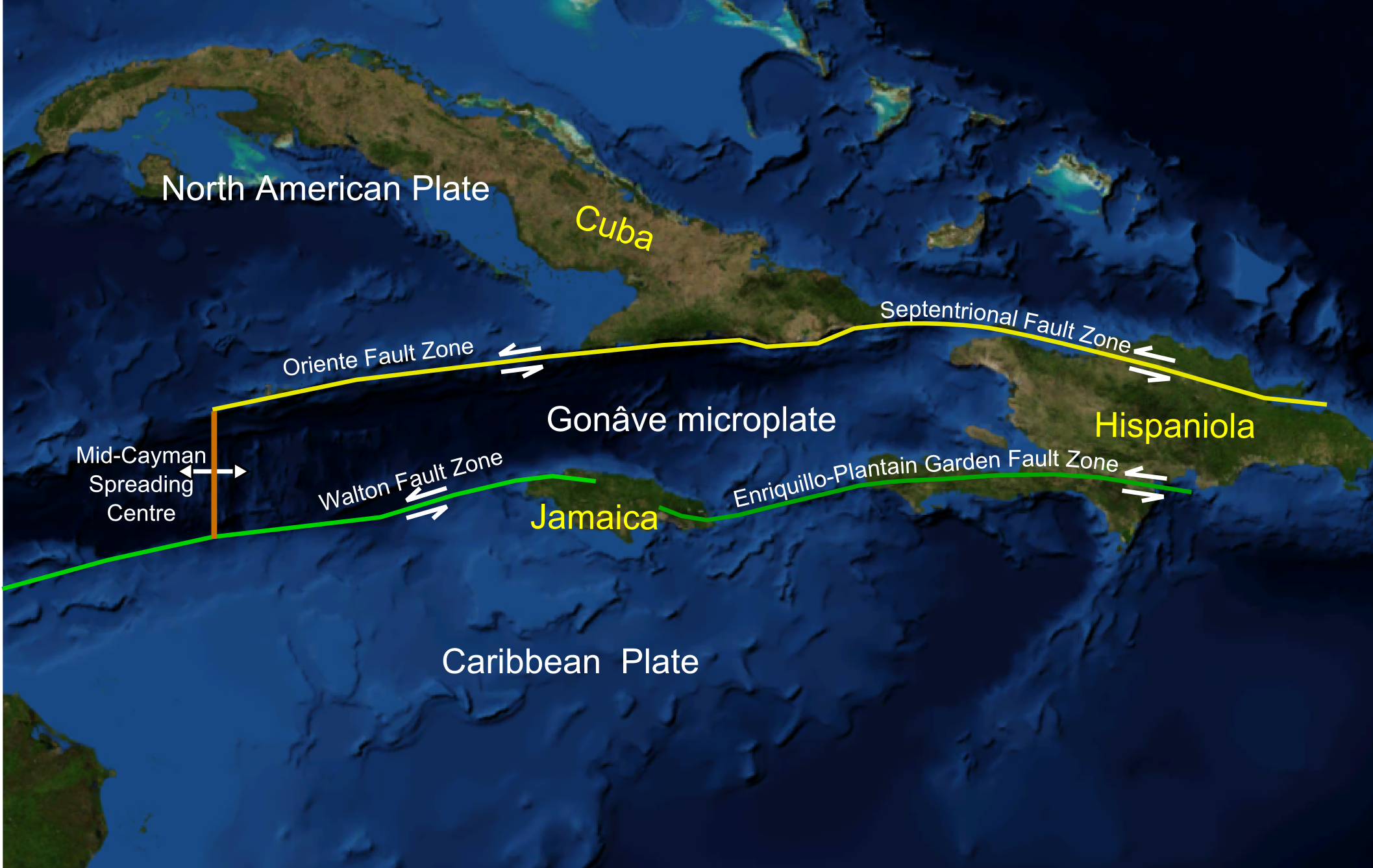
- The Septentrional-Oriente fault zone in the Caribbean and across Hispaniola

- Location within the Dominican Republic
- UTC time: 1946-08-04 17:51:10
- ISC event: 898498
- USGS-ANSS: ComCat
- Local date: August 4, 1946
- Local time: 13:51 AST
- Magnitude: 7.8 M_{w} 8.1 M_{s}
- Depth: 15.0 km (9.3 mi)
- Epicenter: 19°12′00″N 69°18′58″W
- Areas affected: Dominican Republic
- Max. intensity: MMI IX (Violent)
- Peak acceleration: 0.4 g (est)
- Tsunami: Yes
- Casualties: 1,790

The 1946 Dominican Republic earthquake occurred on August 4 at 13:51 AST near Samaná, Dominican Republic. It was the largest earthquake to occur in the instrumental era in the Caribbean. It generated a tsunami that was observed as far as New Jersey. A total of 1,790 deaths were reported.

== Tectonic setting ==
The Dominican Republic is located on the eastern part of Hispaniola, which is the site of a complex tectonic environment. The North American plate undergoes subduction below the Caribbean plate. In addition, the seismically active strike-slip Septentrional–Oriente fault zone runs through the northern part of the island. It has been estimated that the fault accumulates about 12 millimetres (1.2 cm; 0.47 in) of strain every year. Major earthquakes (M>=7) have occurred in the northeastern Caribbean at least eleven times over the past 250 years, at least five of which have been located on the megathrust.

== Earthquake ==
The earthquake occurred on August 4 at 13:51 AST with an epicenter near the coast of Samaná Province in the northern Dominican Republic. The mainshock measured 7.8 on the moment magnitude scale; 8.1 on the surface-wave magnitude scale, and originated at a depth of 15 km (9.3 mi). It was caused by movement on a northeast-dipping thrust fault striking northwest.

At least 63 aftershocks followed the largest earthquake including a magnitude 7.0 event that struck the coast on August 8. These aftershocks were distributed offshore along a west–northwest trending zone measuring 250 by 75 km (155 by 47 mi). Several aftershocks with focal depths greater than 70 km (43 mi) delineate a south or southwest dipping plate that is subducted beneath the region.

== Tsunami ==
A tsunami was generated by the initial earthquake and caused widespread devastation across Hispaniola. The tsunami was observed in much of the Caribbean and the northwestern Atlantic Ocean. Maximum tsunami heights exceeded 5 metres (16 ft) in several locations, with a height of 8 metres (26 ft) observed at Playa Boca Nueva, although it was likely associated with splash-up. A small tsunami was also recorded by tide gauges at San Juan in Puerto Rico, Bermuda and in the United States at Daytona Beach, Florida and Atlantic City, New Jersey.

== See also ==
- List of earthquakes in 1946
- List of earthquakes in the Dominican Republic
- List of earthquakes in the Caribbean
