= 1984 San Pedro Basin earthquake =

Earthquake off the coast of the Dominican Republic

- Location within the Dominican Republic
- UTC time: 1984-06-24 11:17:14
- ISC event: 551495
- USGS-ANSS: ComCat
- Local date: 24 June 1984
- Local time: 07:17:14
- Magnitude: 6.7 M_{w}
- Depth: 35 km
- Epicenter: 17.97°N 69.3°W
- Type: Thrust
- Areas affected: Dominican Republic
- Total damage: Limited
- Max. intensity: MMI VII (Very strong)
- Casualties: 5 deaths

The 1984 San Pedro Basin earthquake occurred on June 24 at 07:17:14 local time with a moment magnitude of 6.7 and a maximum Mercalli intensity of VII (Very strong). The event occurred off the southern coast of the Dominican Republic and resulted in an estimated five fatalities.

== Tectonic setting ==
The northern boundary of the Caribbean plate is a diffuse zone of varied fault types. The Muertos Trough marks the southern portion of this zone of deformation with north dipping convergence.

== Earthquake ==
This thrust earthquake occurred on a shallow and north-dipping fault and, at the time, it was the largest instrumentally recorded event in the Los Muertos Trough.

== Intensity ==
The United States Geological Survey estimated that more than 227,000 people were exposed to intensity VII (Very strong) shaking and more than 2.8 million experienced intensity VI (Strong) shaking.

== Aftershock ==
Five hours after the mainshock, a destructive 5.2 M_{w} aftershock occurred about 5–10 miles to the northeast. Five deaths are also attributed to this event.

== See also ==
- Geography of the Dominican Republic
- Hispaniola
- List of earthquakes in the Caribbean
