= Geology of Puerto Rico =

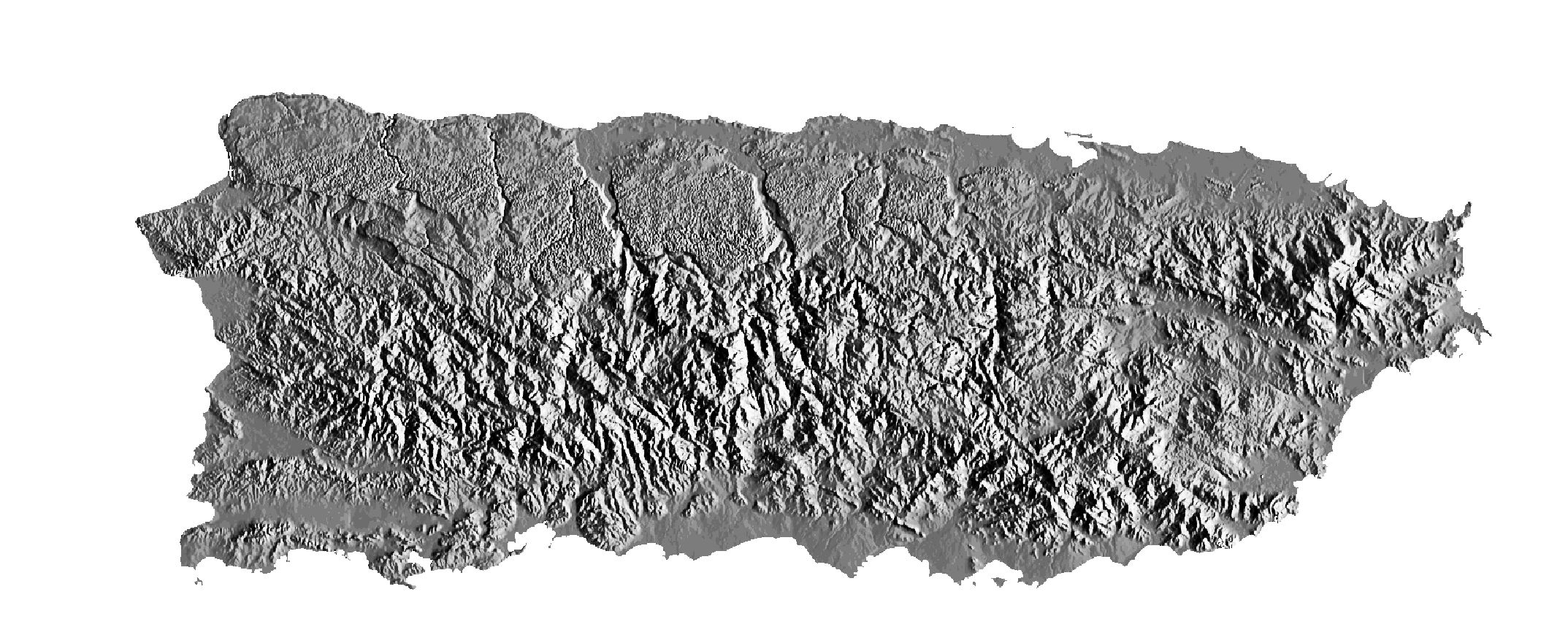
Topography of Puerto Rico

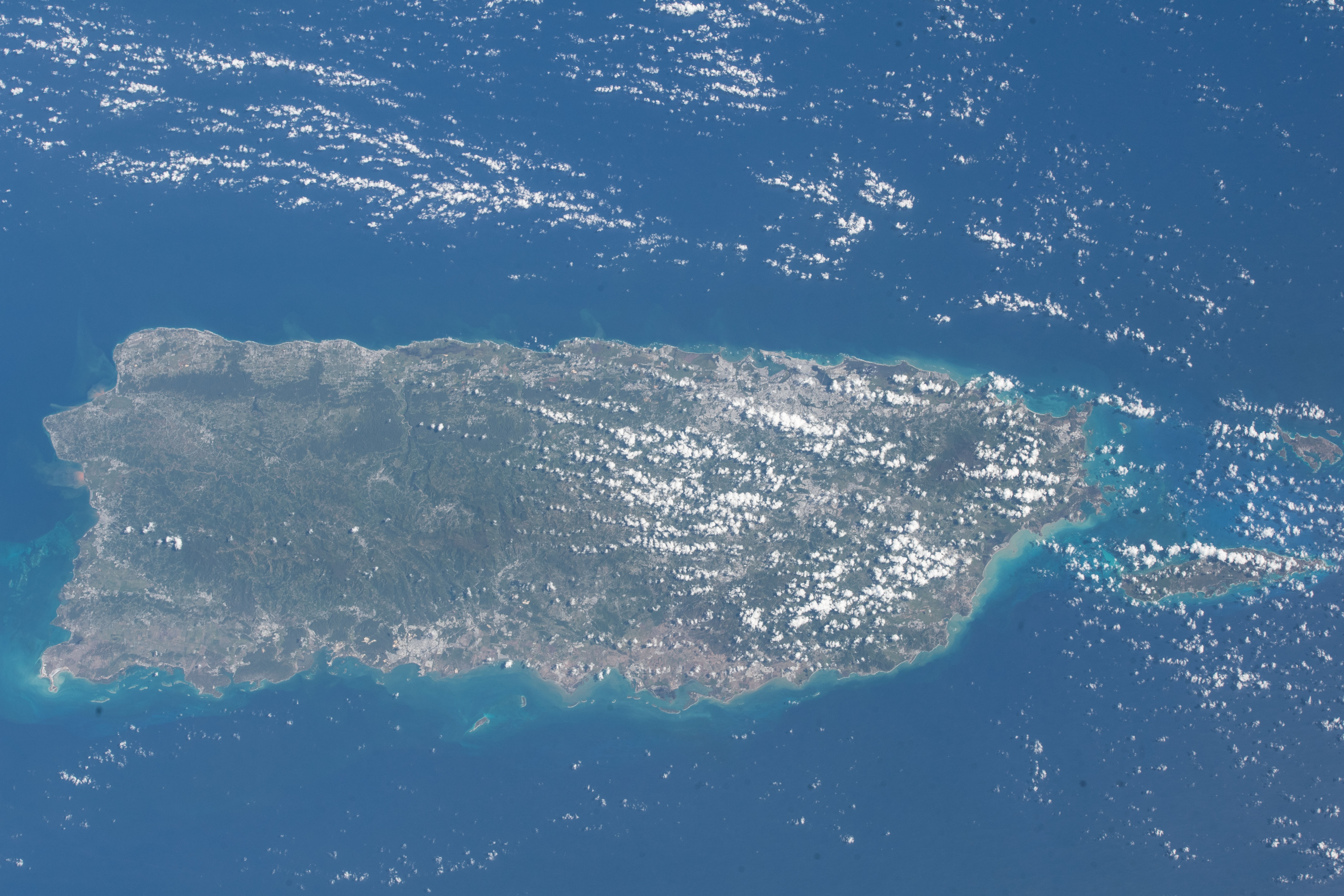
Satellite Image of Puerto Rico

The Geology of Puerto Rico can be divided into three major geologic provinces: The Cordillera Central, the Carbonate, and the Coastal Lowlands. Puerto Rico is composed of Jurassic to Eocene volcanic and plutonic rocks, which are overlain by younger Oligocene to recent carbonates and other sedimentary rocks. Most of the caverns and karst topography on the island occurs in the northern Oligocene to recent carbonates. The oldest rocks are approximately 190 million years old (Jurassic) and are located at Sierra Bermeja in the southwest part of the island. These rocks may represent part of the oceanic crust and are believed to come from the Pacific Ocean realm.

During the Carboniferous period, Puerto Rico was submerged. Due to this, ancient shark tiger teeth have been found at Tibes. These are also common in the karst region of the northern coast. In 1992, several megalodon teeth were unearthed at Isabela.

Puerto Rico lies at the boundary between the Caribbean Plate and North American Plate. This means that it is currently being deformed by the tectonic stresses caused by the interaction of these plates. These stresses may cause earthquakes and tsunamis. These seismic events, along with landslides, represent some of the most dangerous geologic hazards in the island and in the northeastern Caribbean. The largest, most recent major earthquake occurred on January 7th, 2020 and had an estimated magnitude of 6.4 on the Moment magnitude scale. It originated off the 7 miles south coast of Yauco with a depth of 7.4 km. On September 24, 2019, an earthquake over 6.0 was recorded 49 miles off the island's northwest coast at a shallow depth of 6 miles. It was recorded by the United States Geological Survey (USGS) organization.

Lying about 75 miles (121 km) north of Puerto Rico in the Atlantic Ocean at the boundary between the Caribbean and North American plates is the Puerto Rico Trench, the largest and deepest trench in the Atlantic. The trench is 1,090 miles (1,750 km) long and about 60 miles (97 km) wide. At its deepest point (named Milwaukee Depth), it is 27,493 feet (8,380 m) deep. At this trench the North American Plate is being subducted by the Caribbean Plate. This subduction zone is responsible for the volcanism of the West Indies to the southeast of Puerto Rico. A major transform fault extends from the Puerto Rico trench along the northern coast of Puerto Rico and on through the Cayman Trough to the coast of Central America. Approximately 50 miles ESE of Fajardo, Puerto Rico, past the island of Vieques and approximately 20 miles south of Saint Thomas in the U.S. Virgin Islands, can be found the Virgin Islands Basin, which in places exceeds 14,000 feet in depth.

== Gallery ==
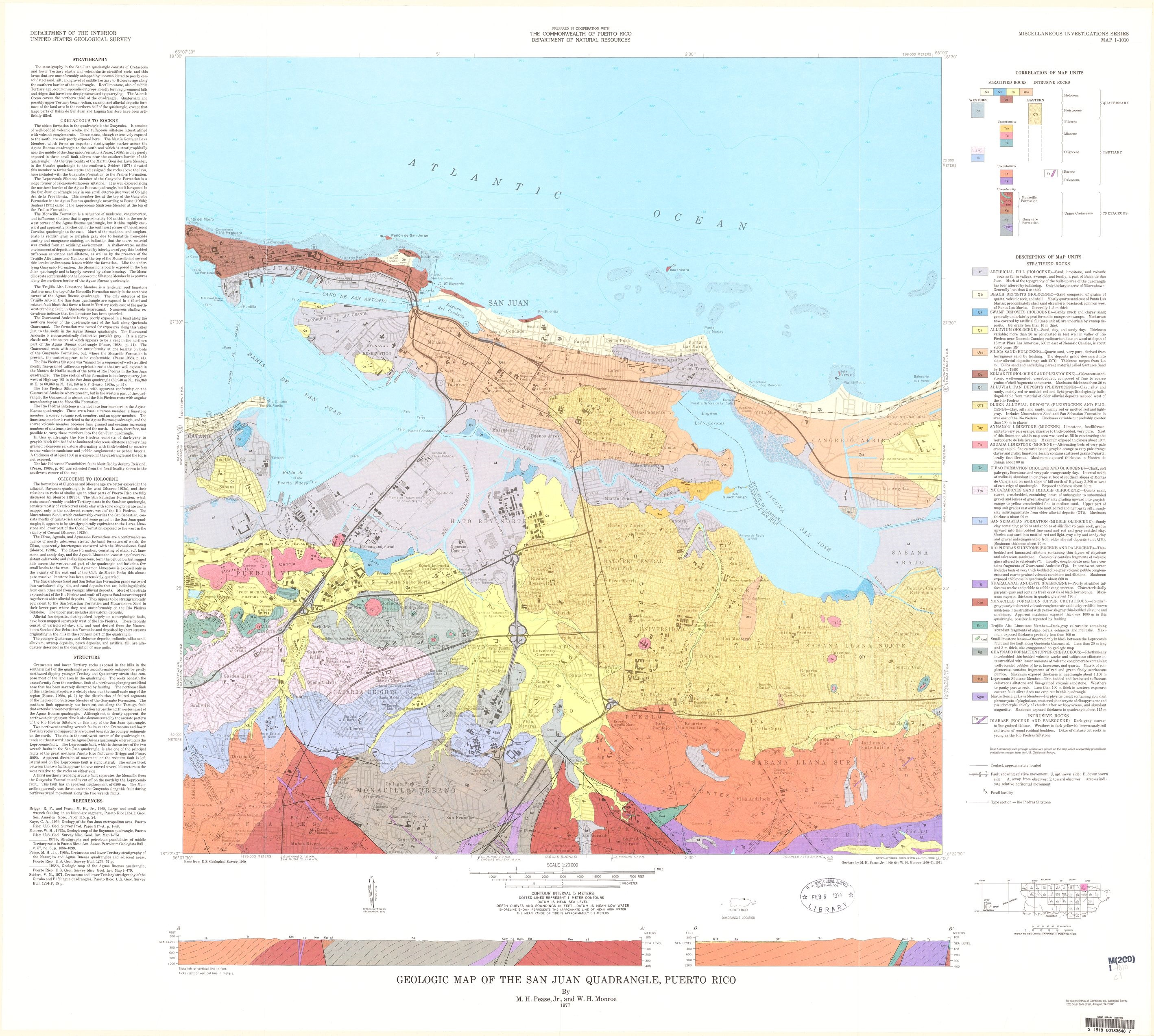
1977 Geologic Map of San Juan Quadrangle, showing San Juan Antiguo, Santurce and other northern barrios of San Juan

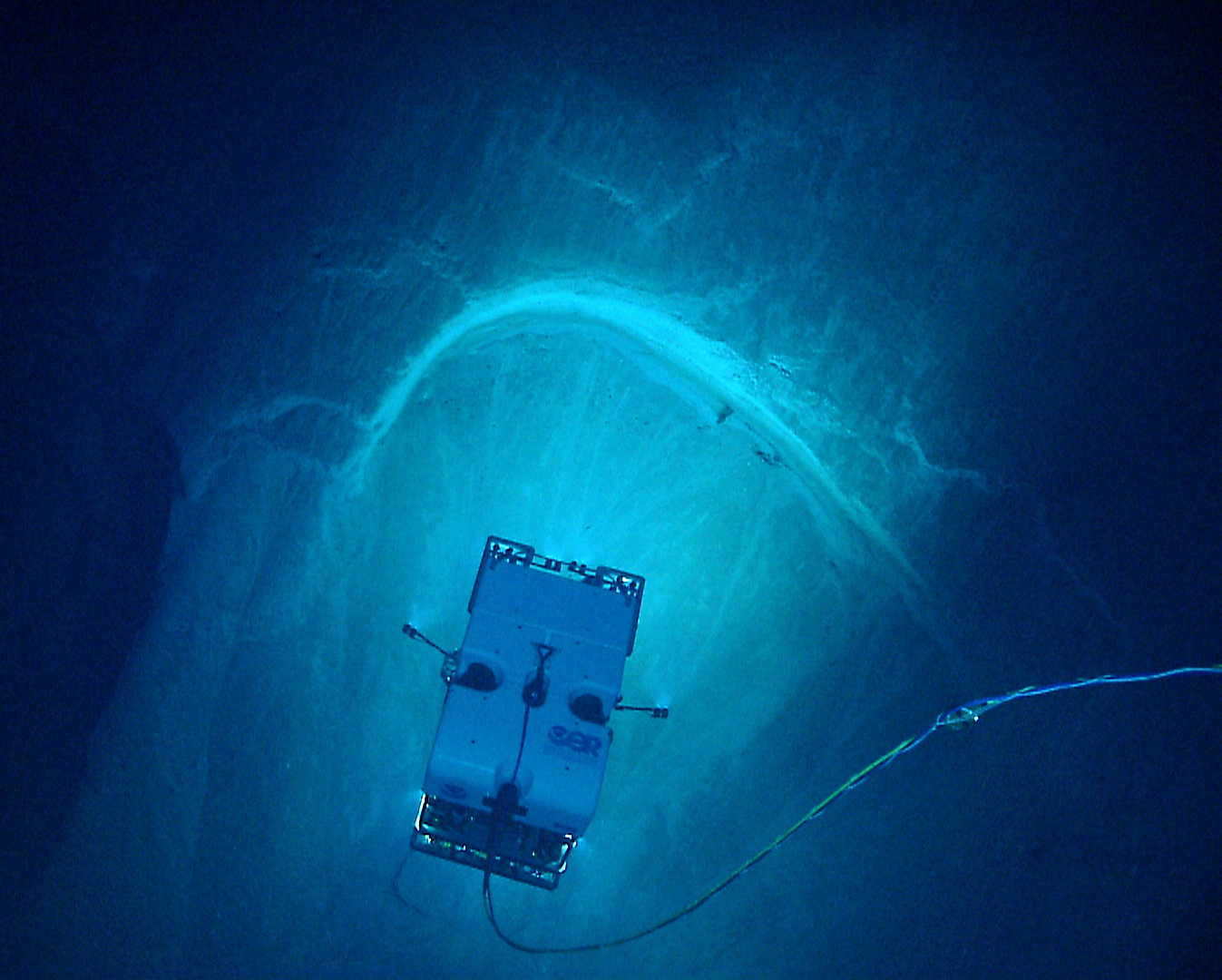
"Image of remotely operated vehicle Deep Discoverer exploring a spectacular arcuate, headwall scarp measuring 20 meters (66 feet) across, seen in the carbonate Juana Diaz Formation, Guayanilla Canyon, to the south of Puerto Rico" (NOAA)

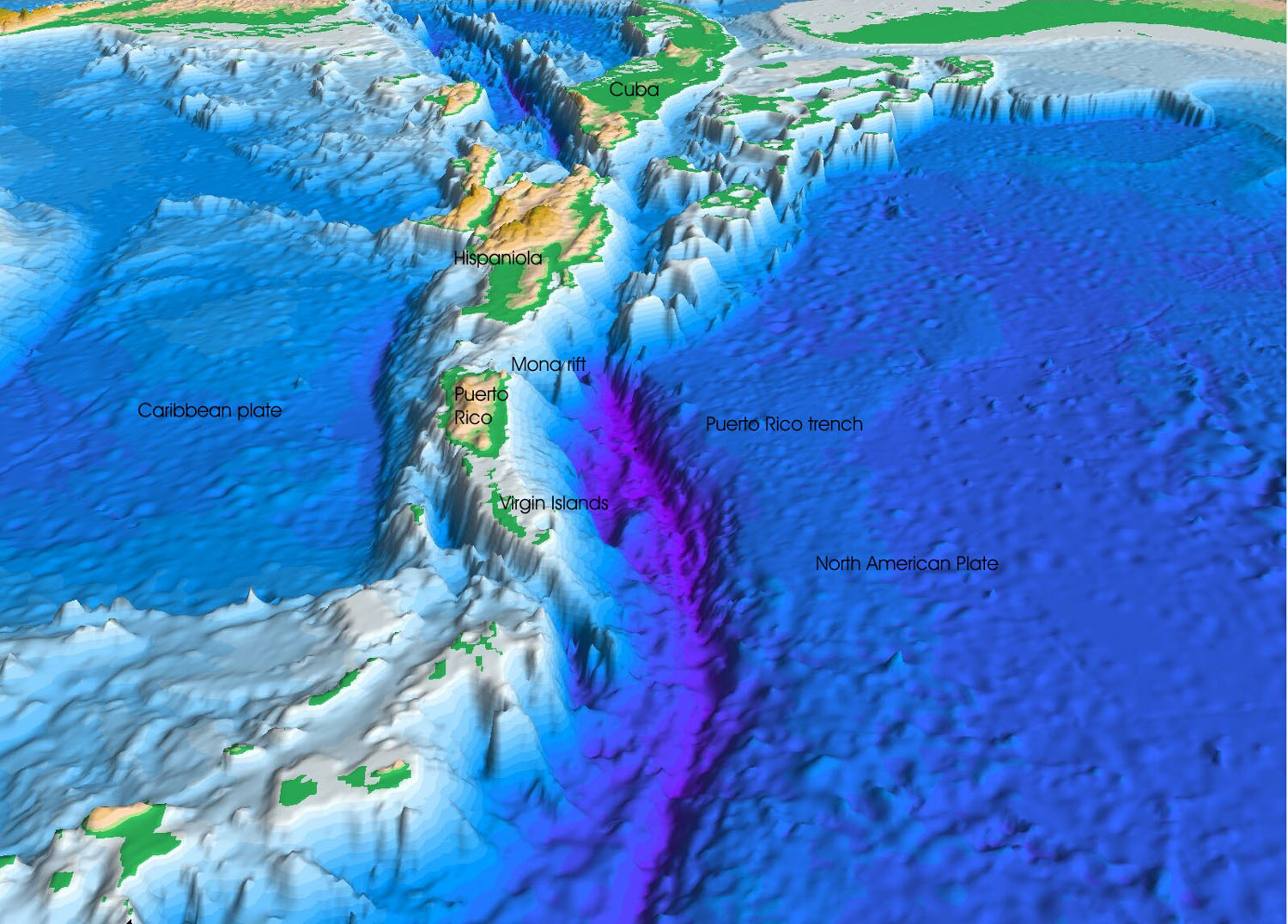
Diagram of the Atlantic Trench

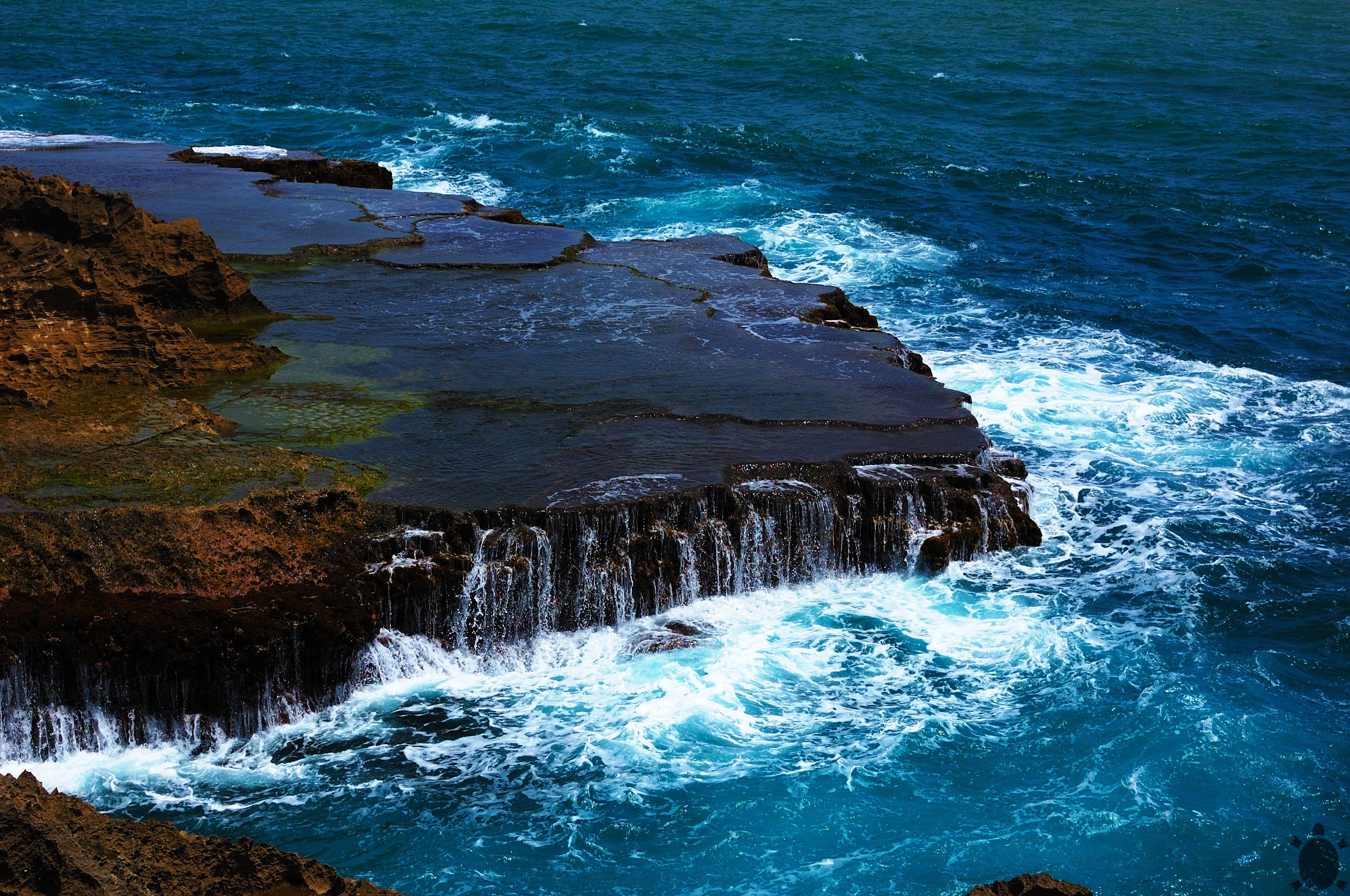
Atlantic Ocean and rocks in Isabela, Puerto Rico

== See also ==
- Geography of Puerto Rico
- List of earthquakes in Puerto Rico
- Seismology
