= Lesser Antilles subduction zone =

Convergent plate boundary along the eastern margin of the Lesser Antilles island arc

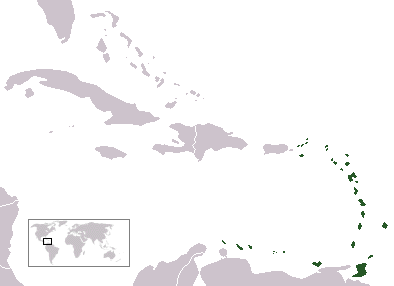
Locator map of the Lesser Antilles

The Lesser Antilles subduction zone is a convergent plate boundary on the seafloor along the eastern margin of the Lesser Antilles Volcanic Arc. In this subduction zone, oceanic crust of the South American plate is being subducted under the Caribbean plate.
