= List of earthquakes in 2018 =

Earthquakes in 2018
Approximate epicenters of notable earthquakes in 2018
- 4.0–5.9 magnitude
- 6.0–6.9 magnitude
- 7.0–7.9 magnitude
- 8.0+ magnitude
- Strongest: 8.2 M_{w} Fiji
- Deadliest: 7.5 M_{w} (Indonesia) Indonesia; 4,340 deaths
- Total fatalities: 5,247

Number by magnitude
- 9.0+: 0
- 8.0–8.9: 1
- 7.0–7.9: 16
- 6.0–6.9: 117
- 5.0–5.9: 1,675
- 4.0–4.9: 12,777

This is a list of earthquakes in 2018. Only earthquakes of magnitude 6 or above are included, unless they result in damage and/or casualties, or are notable for other reasons. All dates are listed according to UTC time. Maximum intensities are indicated on the Mercalli intensity scale and are sourced from United States Geological Survey (USGS) ShakeMap data. In a busy year with 17 major quakes, Indonesia was hit particularly hard. More than 500 people died in Lombok in August and a major earthquake struck the Palu region in September, with more than 4,000 casualties caused mainly by liquefaction and a tsunami. Other deadly events took place in Papua New Guinea, Japan, Haiti, Taiwan and Mexico. The strongest quake with a magnitude of 8.2 occurred in Fiji, at a great depth of 600 km (373 mi).

== Compared to previous years ==
Number of earthquakes worldwide for 2008 –2018
| Magnitude | 2008 | 2009 | 2010 | 2011 | 2012 | 2013 | 2014 | 2015 | 2016 | 2017 | 2018 |
|---|---|---|---|---|---|---|---|---|---|---|---|
| 8.0–9.9 | 0 | 1 | 1 | 1 | 2 | 2 | 1 | 1 | 0 | 1 | 1 |
| 7.0–7.9 | 12 | 16 | 21 | 19 | 15 | 17 | 11 | 18 | 16 | 6 | 16 |
| 6.0–6.9 | 168 | 144 | 151 | 204 | 129 | 125 | 140 | 124 | 128 | 106 | 117 |
| 5.0–5.9 | 1,768 | 1,896 | 1,963 | 2,271 | 1,412 | 1,402 | 1,475 | 1,413 | 1,502 | 1,451 | 1,675 |
| 4.0–4.9 | 12,292 | 6,805 | 10,164 | 13,303 | 10,990 | 9,795 | 13,494 | 13,239 | 12,771 | 11,296 | 12,777 |
| Total | 14,240 | 8,862 | 12,300 | 15,798 | 12,548 | 11,341 | 15,121 | 14,795 | 14,420 | 12,860 | 14,586 |

An increase in detected earthquake numbers does not necessarily represent an increase in earthquakes per se. Population increase, habitation spread, and advances in earthquake detection technology all contribute to higher earthquake numbers being recorded over time.

== By death toll ==
| Rank | Death toll | Magnitude | Location | MMI | Depth (km) | Date |
|---|---|---|---|---|---|---|
| 1 | 4,340 | 7.5 | Indonesia, Sulawesi | X (Extreme) | 20.0 | September 28 |
| 2 | 513 | 6.9 | Indonesia, Lombok | VIII (Severe) | 31.0 | August 5 |
| 3 | 160 | 7.5 | Papua New Guinea, Western Highlands | IX (Violent) | 25.2 | February 25 |
| 4 | 41 | 6.6 | Japan, Hokkaido | X (Extreme) | 35.0 | September 5 |
| 5 | 25 | 6.7 | Papua New Guinea, Western Highlands | VII (Very strong) | 10.0 | March 6 |
| 6 | 20 | 6.4 | Indonesia, Lombok | VII (Very strong) | 14.0 | July 28 |
| 7 | 18 | 5.9 | Haiti, Nord-Ouest | VI (Strong) | 24.0 | October 7 |
| 8 | 17 | 6.4 | Taiwan, Hualien | VIII (Severe) | 17.0 | February 6 |
| 9 | 14 | 6.9 | Indonesia, Lombok | VII (Very strong) | 25.6 | August 19 |
| 10 | 11 | 6.0 | Papua New Guinea, Western Highlands | VII (Very strong) | 10.0 | March 4 |

Listed are earthquakes with at least 10 dead.

== By magnitude ==
| Rank | Magnitude | Death toll | Location | MMI | Depth (km) | Date |
|---|---|---|---|---|---|---|
| 1 | 8.2 | 0 | Fiji | V (Moderate) | 600.0 | August 18 |
| 2 | 7.9 | 0 | United States, Alaska | V (Moderate) | 14.1 | January 23 |
| 2 | 7.9 | 0 | Fiji | IV (Light) | 670.6 | September 6 |
| 4 | 7.5 | 4,340 | Indonesia, Sulawesi | X (Extreme) | 20.0 | September 28 |
| 4 | 7.5 | 160 | Papua New Guinea, Western Highlands | IX (Violent) | 25.2 | February 25 |
| 4 | 7.5 | 0 | Honduras, Swan Islands | VII (Very strong) | 19.0 | January 10 |
| 4 | 7.5 | 0 | New Caledonia | VI (Strong) | 10.0 | December 5 |
| 8 | 7.3 | 5 | Venezuela, Sucre | VII (Very strong) | 154.3 | August 21 |
| 8 | 7.3 | 0 | Russia, Kamchatka | VII (Very strong) | 16.6 | December 20 |
| 10 | 7.2 | 14 | Mexico, Oaxaca | VII (Very strong) | 22.0 | February 16 |
| 11 | 7.1 | 2 | Peru, Ica | VII (Very strong) | 39.0 | January 14 |
| 11 | 7.1 | 0 | New Caledonia | V (Moderate) | 26.7 | August 29 |
| 11 | 7.1 | 0 | South Georgia and the South Sandwich Islands | V (Moderate) | 164.7 | December 11 |
| 11 | 7.1 | 0 | Peru, Arequipa | III (Weak) | 609.5 | August 24 |
| 15 | 7.1 | 0 | United States, Alaska | VIII (Severe) | 46.7 | November 30 |
| 15 | 7.0 | 0 | Papua New Guinea | VII (Very strong) | 40.3 | October 10 |
| 15 | 7.0 | 0 | Philippines, Mindanao | V (Moderate) | 60.1 | December 29 |

Listed are earthquakes with at least 7.0 magnitude.

== By month ==
=== January ===
January
- Strongest: 7.9 M_{w} United States
- Deadliest: 7.1 M_{w} (Peru) Peru; 2 deaths 5.9 M_{w} (Indonesia) Indonesia; 2 deaths 6.1 M_{w} Afghanistan; 2 deaths
- Total fatalities: 8

Number by magnitude
- 8.0–8.9: 0
- 7.0–7.9: 3
- 6.0–6.9: 8
- 5.0–5.9: 118
- 4.0–4.9: 1,076

| Date | Country and location | M_{w} | Depth (km) | MMI | Notes | Casualties | |
| Date | Country and location | M_{w} | Depth (km) | MMI | Notes | Dead | Injured |
|---|---|---|---|---|---|---|---|
| 2 | Algeria, Blida, 11 km southwest of El Affroun | 4.7 | 8.3 | VI | Some damage occurred in Blida and Tipaza wilayas. Two people were injured. | - | 2 |
| 3 | El Salvador, La Libertad offshore, 32 km south of La Libertad | 5.2 | 73.5 | IV | Minor damage was caused to a hospital in Santa Tecla and a landslide occurred in the Lago de Coatepeque. | - | – |
| 4 | Montenegro, Plav Municipality, 9 km northwest of Plav | 5.1 | 10.0 | V | Light damage to houses was caused, including cracks in walls and fallen chimneys. | - | - |
| 6 | Iran, Kermanshah, 16 km north northwest of Sarpol-e Zahab | 5.0 | 10.0 | VI | 51 people were injured, and additional damage was caused in Sarpol-e Zahab. It was an aftershock of the 2017 Iran–Iraq earthquake. | - | 51 |
| 10 | Honduras, Gracias a Dios offshore, 203 km north northeast of Barra Patuca | 7.5 | 19.0 | VII | The 2018 Swan Islands earthquake caused minor damage, such as cracks in walls. A tsunami was observed with heights of 0.4 m (1.3 ft) in Roatán. | - | - |
| 11 | Iran, Kermanshah, 16 km east southeast of Mandali, Iraq | 5.5 | 10.0 | VII | Some old houses were destroyed and 5 people injured. It was an aftershock of the 2017 Iran–Iraq earthquake. | - | 5 |
| 11 | Myanmar, Bago, 40 km west southwest of Pyu | 6.0 | 9.0 | VII | - | - | - |
| 14 | Peru, Arequipa offshore, 37 km west of Atiquipa | 7.1 | 39.0 | VII | During the 2018 Peru earthquake, more than 170 adobe houses collapsed in Arequipa region, and roads were blocked by landslides. Two people died and 139 others were injured. | 2 | 139 |
| 19 | Mexico, Baja California Sur offshore, 79 km north northeast of Loreto | 6.3 | 10.0 | V | Slight damage was caused to some buildings, such as cracks on walls and broken windows. | - | - |
| 21 | Chile, Arica y Parinacota, 100 km east southeast of Arica | 6.3 | 116.0 | V | - | - | - |
| 23 | Indonesia, Banten offshore, 66 km west of Pelabuhanratu | 5.9 | 48.2 | V | The 2018 West Java earthquake damaged hundreds of houses and injured at least eight students, six of them seriously when the roof of their high school collapsed in Cianjur. Two people died of heart attacks in Lebak and Sukabumi and 41 others were injured. | 2 | 41 |
| 23 | United States, Alaska offshore, 261 km southeast of Chiniak | 7.9 | 14.1 | V | During the 2018 Gulf of Alaska earthquake, slight damage was reported in Kodiak, and a tsunami-wave of 0.25 m (0.82 ft) was observed. | - | - |
| 24 | Japan, Aomori offshore, 99 km east northeast of Misawa | 6.3 | 31.0 | V | - | - | - |
| 25 | Russia, Kamchatka, 259 km east southeast of Ust'-Kamchatsk Staryy | 6.2 | 11.2 | VI | - | - | - |
| 26 | Papua New Guinea, Madang, 188 km north of Madang | 6.3 | 10.0 | IV | - | - | - |
| 28 | Norway, Bouvet Island offshore | 6.6 | 10.0 | I | - | - | - |
| 31 | Afghanistan, Badakhshan, 37 km south of Jurm | 6.2 | 193.7 | IV | Some houses were damaged in Afghanistan and Pakistan. One girl was killed and 10 others were injured in Pakistan. Tremors were felt as far away as New Delhi and Islamabad. In Swat Valley, a visitor in a local hotel passed away as a result of a heart attack due to jolts in the building. | 2 | 22 |
| 31 | Pakistan, Balochistan, 11 km northwest of Bela | 4.7 | 10.0 | V | A two-year-old girl died when a house collapsed in Lasbela District. Nine other people were also injured. | 1 | 9 |
| 31 | Ecuador, Pastaza, 32 km east of Palora | 5.2 | 20.5 | VI | A 12-year-old girl died when a wall collapsed on her in Huamboya. | 1 | – |

=== February ===
February
- Strongest: 7.5 M_{w} Papua New Guinea
- Deadliest: 7.5 M_{w} (Papua New Guinea) Papua New Guinea; 160 deaths
- Total fatalities: 192

Number by magnitude
- 8.0–8.9: 0
- 7.0–7.9: 2
- 6.0–6.9: 9
- 5.0–5.9: 145
- 4.0–4.9: 922

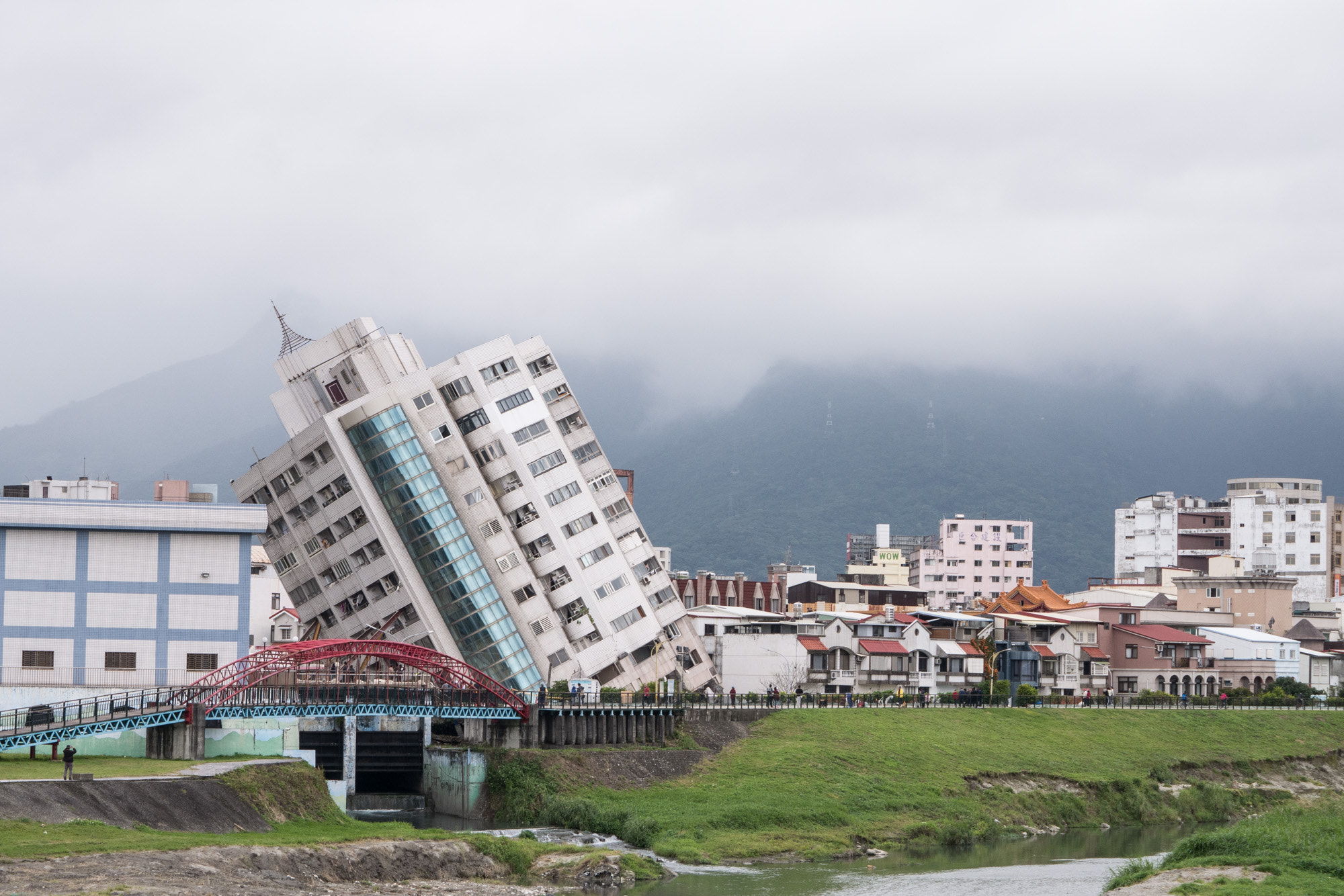
Damage to the Yun Men Tsui Ti building in Hualien, Taiwan.

| Date | Country and location | M_{w} | Depth (km) | MMI | Notes | Casualties | |
| Date | Country and location | M_{w} | Depth (km) | MMI | Notes | Dead | Injured |
|---|---|---|---|---|---|---|---|
| 1 | Fiji, Northern offshore, 254 km south southeast of Alo, Wallis and Futuna, France | 6.0 | 10.0 | IV | – | – | – |
| 4 | Taiwan, Hualien, 22 km north northeast of Hualien | 6.1 | 12.0 | VI | It was a foreshock of the 6.4 quake on February 6. | – | - |
| 6 | Taiwan, Hualien, 18 km north northeast of Hualien | 6.4 | 17.0 | VIII | The 2018 Hualien earthquake struck near Hualien. 17 people died, including tourists, and more than 270 were injured. Several buildings collapsed, including a hotel, as well as many bridges. | 17 | 277 |
| 8 | Indonesia, Aceh, 52 km south of Reuleuet | 5.2 | 10.0 | VI | Some houses and other buildings suffered damage such as cracked walls and fallen concrete. | – | – |
| 9 | Fiji, Lomaiviti offshore, 215 km east of Levuka | 6.0 | 556.9 | II | – | – | – |
| 10 | South Korea, North Gyeongsang, 5 km southwest of Heunghae | 4.7 | 5.4 | VI | Around 181 houses were damaged in Pohang district and 40 people were injured. | – | 40 |
| 11 | Northern Mariana Islands offshore, 138 km east southeast of San Jose Village | 6.0 | 10.0 | IV | – | – | - |
| 16 | Mexico, Oaxaca, 4 km south of Pinotepa de Don Luis | 7.2 | 22.0 | VII | The 2018 Oaxaca earthquake struck Oaxaca state. Dozens of houses were damaged and two people were injured. A helicopter also crashed during rescue operations, killing 14 people and injuring 15 others. | 14 (indirect) | 17 (15 indirect) |
| 17 | United Kingdom, Wales, 5 km northeast of Clydach | 4.3 | 11.6 | V | Five buildings were damaged in Bristol. It is the largest earthquake in the UK since 2008. | – | – |
| 25 | Papua New Guinea, Hela, 32 km southwest of Tari | 7.5 | 25.2 | IX | The 2018 Papua New Guinea earthquake destroyed thousands of properties in Hela and Southern Highlands; it also caused massive landslides and power outages. 160 people were killed and more than 500 injured, while some buildings suffered damage in Papua province, Indonesia. | 160 | 500+ |
| 26 | Indonesia, Maluku, 194 km west northwest of Ambon | 6.1 | 9.0 | V | – | – | – |
| 26 | Papua New Guinea, Southern Highlands, 59 km southwest of Mendi | 6.3 | 19.0 | VII | This was an aftershock of the 7.5 quake on February 25. | – | – |
| 27 | Australia offshore, west of Macquarie Island | 6.1 | 10.0 | I | – | – | |
| 28 | Papua New Guinea, Western, 63 km southwest of Tari | 6.1 | 16.0 | VII | This was an aftershock of the 7.5 quake on February 25. One person was buried by a landslide in Komo. | 1 | – |

=== March ===
March
- Strongest: 6.9 M_{w} Papua New Guinea
- Deadliest: 6.7 M_{w} Papua New Guinea; 25 deaths
- Total fatalities: 36

Number by magnitude
- 8.0–8.9: 0
- 7.0–7.9: 0
- 6.0–6.9: 8
- 5.0–5.9: 133
- 4.0–4.9: 953

| Date | Country and location | M_{w} | Depth (km) | MMI | Notes | Casualties | |
| Date | Country and location | M_{w} | Depth (km) | MMI | Notes | Dead | Injured |
|---|---|---|---|---|---|---|---|
| 4 | Papua New Guinea, Western, 66 km southwest of Tari | 6.0 | 10.0 | VII | This was an aftershock of the 7.5 quake on February 25. 11 people were killed after a landslide buried the small village of Huya. | 11 | – |
| 5 | United States, Oklahoma, 4 km north of Breckinridge | 4.2 | 8.1 | V | One house in Breckenridge was badly damaged and others suffered structural damage. Cracks in walls and broken windows occurred as well. | – | – |
| 6 | Papua New Guinea, Western, 62 km southwest of Tari | 6.7 | 20.5 | VII | This was an aftershock of the 7.5 quake on February 25. 25 people were killed by further mudslides. | 25 | – |
| 7 | Iran, Kerman, 111 km north northeast of Minab | 5.2 | 35.5 | IV | Some buildings were damaged and 6 people injured, one of them seriously. | – | 6 |
| 7 | Myanmar, Mandalay, 22 km west northwest of Naypyidaw | 4.8 | 10.0 | IV | Various buildings were damaged, including a pagoda, a clinic and 30 residential buildings. | | – |
| 8 | Mozambique, Zambezia, 24 km northeast of Nsanje, Malawi | 5.5 | 17.0 | VI | Various schools were damaged in Zambezia province, and two pupils were injured. Some damage was also reported in neighbouring Malawi. | – | 2 |
| 8 | Papua New Guinea, East New Britain offshore, 103 km east of Kokopo | 6.8 | 22.9 | VI | – | – | – |
| 14 | Namibia, Kunene, 67 km north northwest of Khorixas | 4.8 | 11.3 | VI | Various homes were damaged, and a school was evacuated after suffering serious damage in Kunene. | – | – |
| 24 | Papua New Guinea, East New Britain, 150 km east of Kimbe | 6.3 | 33.0 | VI | It was a foreshock of the 6.9 quake on March 29. | – | – |
| 24 | Southeast Indian Ridge | 6.0 | 10.0 | I | – | – | – |
| 25 | Indonesia, Maluku offshore, 220 km northwest of Saumlaki | 6.4 | 169.0 | IV | – | – | – |
| 26 | Papua New Guinea, East New Britain 140 km east of Kimbe | 6.7 | 40.0 | VI | It was a foreshock of the 6.9 quake on March 29. | – | – |
| 29 | Papua New Guinea, East New Britain, 150 km east of Kimbe | 6.9 | 35.0 | VI | – | – | – |
| 29 | Tajikistan, Khatlon, 11 km southeast of Roghun | 5.7 | 5.0 | VII | Four houses destroyed and 80 others damaged in Sarikhosor. | – | – |

=== April ===
April
- Strongest: 6.8 M_{w} Bolivia
- Deadliest: 6.3 M_{w} Papua New Guinea; 4 deaths
- Total fatalities: 7

Number by magnitude
- 8.0–8.9: 0
- 7.0–7.9: 0
- 6.0–6.9: 7
- 5.0–5.9: 90
- 4.0–4.9: 917

| Date | Country and location | M_{w} | Depth (km) | MMI | Notes | Casualties | |
| Date | Country and location | M_{w} | Depth (km) | MMI | Notes | Dead | Injured |
|---|---|---|---|---|---|---|---|
| 1 | Iran, Kermanshah, 12 km west southwest of Sarpol-e Zahab | 5.0 | 10.0 | VI | 54 people were injured by falling items. It was an aftershock of the 2017 Iran–Iraq earthquake. | – | 54 |
| 2 | Tonga offshore, south of the Fiji Islands | 6.1 | 92.0 | III | – | – | – |
| 2 | Bolivia, Chuquisaca, 38 km southeast of Boyuibe | 6.8 | 559.0 | III | – | – | – |
| 2 | El Salvador, Usulután offshore, 24 km southwest of Puerto El Triunfo | 5.9 | 50.0 | VI | Six houses were damaged in San Vicente. | – | – |
| 5 | United States, California offshore, 29 km southwest of Santa Cruz Island | 5.3 | 9.9 | V | Slight damage was caused on Santa Cruz island, where a ranch was damaged. | - | - |
| 5 | Philippines, Davao offshore, 43 km east southeast of Tarragona | 6.0 | 34.0 | V | - | - | - |
| 7 | Papua New Guinea, Hela, 45 km west of Tari | 6.3 | 18.1 | VI | It was an aftershock of the 7.5 quake on February 25. Further damage was caused, and four people were killed when houses collapsed in Tari. | 4 | – |
| 8 | Japan, Shimane, 8 km north northeast of Ōda | 5.7 | 10.3 | VII | Roads and some buildings were damaged in the hardest-hit Ōda. Eight people were wounded. | – | 8 |
| 10 | Italy, Marche, 1 km south southeast of Muccia | 4.7 | 10.0 | V | Some damage was caused, and a bell tower fell in Muccia. Schools in the region were also closed. | – | – |
| 10 | Chile, Coquimbo, 56 km southwest of Ovalle | 6.2 | 66.0 | VI | Cracks in walls appeared on some buildings in Combarbalá and rockfalls occurred in the region. | – | – |
| 10 | India, 14 km west southwest of Singrauli | 4.6 | 10.0 | V | Three houses were damaged and one girl was injured in Singrauli. | – | 1 |
| 15 | Indonesia, North Sulawesi offshore, 88 km northwest of Kota Ternate | 6.0 | 34.0 | IV | - | - | - |
| 18 | Indonesia, Central Java, 24 km south southeast of Buaran | 4.6 | 10.0 | V | More than 300 houses were damaged in Central Java despite the moderate magnitude. Three people were killed by collapsing buildings and 21 others injured. | 3 | 21 |
| 19 | South Africa offshore, Prince Edward Islands region | 6.0 | 10.0 | I | – | – | – |
| 24 | Turkey, Adiyaman, 3 km east northeast of Samsat | 5.2 | 10.0 | VII | Serious damage was caused to buildings in Samsat and some collapsed, including a mosque. At least 39 people were injured. | – | 39 |
| 27 | Venezuela, Carabobo, 13 km northwest of Guacara | 4.7 | 10.0 | VI | Slight damage was caused in Carabobo, including cracks in walls and broken windows. Objects fell in supermarkets and some landslides occurred. | - | - |

=== May ===
May
- Strongest: 6.9 M_{w} United States
- Deadliest: 2.2 M_{w} (South Africa) South Africa; 7 deaths
- Total fatalities: 13

Number by magnitude
- 8.0–8.9: 0
- 7.0–7.9: 0
- 6.0–6.9: 6
- 5.0–5.9: 138
- 4.0–4.9: 932

| Date | Country and location | M_{w} | Depth (km) | MMI | Notes | Casualties | |
| Date | Country and location | M_{w} | Depth (km) | MMI | Notes | Dead | Injured |
|---|---|---|---|---|---|---|---|
| 1 | Mexico, Michoacan, Agostitlán | 2.6 | 72.8 | III | At least 12 schools, six houses and a church damaged in Zitacuaro. | – | – |
| 2 | Iran, Kohgiluyeh and Boyer-Ahmad, 10 km west northwest of Yasuj | 5.3 | 8.0 | VII | Power and communications were disrupted. One-hundred-and-five people were injured, 32 of them seriously. Some buildings were also damaged. | - | 105 |
| 2 | Chile offshore, Easter Island region | 6.0 | 10.0 | III | - | - | |
| 3 | South Africa, Johannesburg region | 2.2 | – | – | This small earthquake caused a cave-in in a mine. Seven miners died (three of them in the hospital) and six others were injured. | 7 | 6 |
| 4 | United States, Hawaii, 18 km south southwest of Leilani Estates | 6.9 | 5.8 | VIII | The 2018 Hawaii earthquake was the biggest earthquake to hit the area since 1975. The quake damaged many buildings, caused landslides, and damaged a road, causing it to be shut down. A major eruption of Kīlauea occurred at the same time. | – | – |
| 5 | Philippines, Bicol offshore, 64 km north northwest of Pandan | 6.1 | 18.0 | IV | - | - | - |
| 5 | Poland, Silesia, 2 km south of Bełk | 4.1 | 10.0 | IV | This earthquake caused a mine collapse in Borynia-Zofiowka-Jastrzebie coal mine. Five miners were killed and two others injured. | 5 | 2 |
| 6 | El Salvador, 10 km south of Intipucá | 5.4 | 10.0 | VI | 11 houses were destroyed and more than 180 damaged. Some landslides also occurred. A 3-year-old girl was injured by a falling wall in La Unión. The quake was the strongest of an earthquake swarm. | – | 1 |
| 6 | Iran, 10 km west northwest of Yasuj | 5.3 | 10.0 | VI | 82 people were injured in a panic, 11 of whom were hospitalized. It was an aftershock of the 5.3 quake on May 2. | – | 82 |
| 9 | Pakistan, 29 km north northwest of Bannu | 5.4 | 19.4 | VI | Nine children were injured after jumping from the third floor of a building in a panic. | – | 9 |
| 9 | Papua New Guinea, 178 km south southwest of Kokopo | 6.0 | 9.0 | V | - | - | - |
| 9 | Afghanistan, 36 km northwest of Ishqoshim, Tajikistan | 6.2 | 116.0 | IV | Two people injured when a home collapsed. | - | 2 |
| 15 | France, Mayotte offshore, 32 km east of Pamandzi | 5.9 | 17.0 | V | It was the strongest earthquake ever recorded in Mayotte. Three people were injured. | – | 3 |
| 18 | New Zealand offshore, south of the Kermadec Islands | 6.1 | 11.0 | II | - | – | – |
| 22 | Ecuador, 28 km northwest of Cotacachi | 5.0 | 33.4 | IV | Six people injured and/or fainted in a panic. Various buildings and a hospital damaged in Cotacachi. | - | 6 |
| 27 | China, 14 km west northwest of Fuyu | 5.3 | 10.0 | VI | 1,500 homes were damaged in Yamutu village. | – | – |

=== June ===
June
- Strongest: 6.1 M_{w} Vanuatu
- Deadliest: 5.5 M_{w} Japan; 4 deaths
- Total fatalities: 7

Number by magnitude
- 8.0–8.9: 0
- 7.0–7.9: 0
- 6.0–6.9: 1
- 5.0–5.9: 123
- 4.0–4.9: 932

| Date | Country and location | M_{w} | Depth (km) | MMI | Notes | Casualties | |
| Date | Country and location | M_{w} | Depth (km) | MMI | Notes | Dead | Injured |
|---|---|---|---|---|---|---|---|
| 1 | France, Mayotte offshore, 40 km east southeast of Pamandzi | 4.7 | 10.0 | V | This quake was the strongest of an earthquake swarm with at least 36 quakes throughout the whole day. Six people were injured. | – | 6 |
| 5 | Azerbaijan, 2 km southeast of Mamrux | 5.3 | 22.7 | VI | Homes were damaged and social facilities disrupted. One person died and 31 others were taken to the hospital. | 1 | 31 |
| 11 | India, 18 km northeast of Raha | 4.9 | 47.3 | IV | A school collapsed in Mangaldai, and two students were injured in a classroom. | – | 2 |
| 12 | Colombia, 13 km east southeast of Tangua | 4.9 | 11.6 | VI | More than 100 houses were severely damaged near the epicenter in Nariño department. Two people were killed in Pasto, crushed by their house, and 7 others injured. | 2 | 7 |
| 13 | Indonesia, East Java offshore, 3 km east northeast of Sumenep | 4.6 | 10.0 | V | Dozens of houses and two mosques were damaged in Sumenep. Six people were injured. | – | 6 |
| 17 | Iran, North Khorasan, 28 km west southwest of Bojnurd | 4.9 | 10.0 | – | Two people were injured and some buildings were damaged in Jajarm. | – | 2 |
| 17 | Japan, 2 km northwest of Hirakata , Osaka | 5.5 | 10.3 | VIII | The 2018 Osaka earthquake destroyed several buildings and temples in the region, caused power failures, and damaged roads badly. Four people were killed and more than 400 others injured. | 4 | 417 |
| 21 | Vanuatu, 27 km west southwest of Port-Vila | 6.1 | 28.0 | VII | Slight damage was caused to stores in Port-Vila. | - | - |
| 26 | Iran, 32 km northeast of Sarpol-e Zahab | 4.7 | 10.0 | V | Twelve people were treated for their injuries. It was an aftershock of the 2017 Iran–Iraq earthquake. | – | 12 |

=== July ===
July
- Strongest: 6.4 M_{w} Vanuatu; 6.4 M_{w} Indonesia
- Deadliest: 6.4 M_{w} Indonesia; 20 deaths
- Total fatalities: 21

Number by magnitude
- 8.0–8.9: 0
- 7.0–7.9: 0
- 6.0–6.9: 10
- 5.0–5.9: 127
- 4.0–4.9: 959

| Date | Country and location | M_{w} | Depth (km) | MMI | Notes | Casualties | |
| Date | Country and location | M_{w} | Depth (km) | MMI | Notes | Dead | Injured |
|---|---|---|---|---|---|---|---|
| 6 | Russia, Kamchatka, 93 km east of Ozernovskiy | 6.1 | 45.0 | V | - | – | – |
| 7 | New Zealand offshore, 124 km northeast of L'Esperance Rock, Kermadec Islands | 6.0 | 35.0 | III | - | – | – |
| 11 | Taiwan, Tainan, 12 km west of Yujing | 4.3 | 10.0 | V | Minor damage was caused, such as cracked walls, burst water pipes and fallen water tanks. | – | – |
| 13 | Vanuatu, 72 km north northwest of Isangel | 6.4 | 167.0 | IV | - | – | – |
| 15 | Yemen offshore, 192 km north northwest of Kilmia | 6.0 | 10.0 | IV | These two quakes of a similar size in the same area on the same day can be considered a doublet earthquake. | – | – |
| 15 | Yemen offshore, 214 km north northwest of Kilmia | 6.0 | 10.0 | IV | These two quakes of a similar size in the same area on the same day can be considered a doublet earthquake. | - | - |
| 17 | Solomon Islands, 118 km southeast of Lata, Santa Cruz Islands | 6.0 | 38.0 | V | - | - | - |
| 17 | Iran, 28 km west southwest of Bojnurd | 4.9 | 10.0 | | Some residential buildings were damaged, and two people were wounded while fleeing in a panic. | – | 2 |
| 19 | Colombia, 23 km east northeast of Colombia | 5.1 | 47.8 | VII | Light damage was caused in Bogotá, where some houses collapsed. 21 people were left homeless. | – | – |
| 19 | Papua New Guinea, 91 km west of Kandrian | 6.0 | 29.6 | V | - | - | - |
| 21 | Indonesia, Sumatra, 22 km southeast of Solok | 5.2 | 10.0 | VI | More than 10 houses were damaged in Batang Barus district. One person was killed by a falling wall, and two others were injured. | 1 | 2 |
| 22 | Iran, 31 km east northeast of Sarpol-e Zahab | 5.8 | 12.0 | VII | Some houses suffered damage, and nearly 300 people were injured, eight of them seriously. It was an aftershock of the 2017 Iran–Iraq earthquake. | – | 287 |
| 22 | Iran, 39 km east northeast of Kerman | 5.6 | 10.0 | VII | At least 95 people were injured during this earthquake, and seven were taken to hospitals. | – | 95 |
| 23 | Mid-Atlantic Ridge | 6.0 | 10.0 | I | - | - | - |
| 28 | Indonesia offshore, 177 km north northeast of Maumere | 6.0 | 578.2 | II | - | – | – |
| 28 | Indonesia, Lombok, 33 km north northwest of Labuan Lombok | 6.4 | 14.0 | VI | During the July 2018 Lombok earthquake, 20 people were killed and more than 400 others injured. Hundreds of buildings were damaged on Lombok Island and electricity was cut off. The earthquake was also felt on Bali. It was a foreshock of the 6.9 quake on August 5. | 20 | 401 |

=== August ===
August
- Strongest: 8.2 M_{w} Fiji
- Deadliest: 6.9 M_{w} (Indonesia) Indonesia; 513 deaths
- Total fatalities: 543

Number by magnitude
- 8.0–8.9: 1
- 7.0–7.9: 3
- 6.0–6.9: 19
- 5.0–5.9: 174
- 4.0–4.9: 1,379

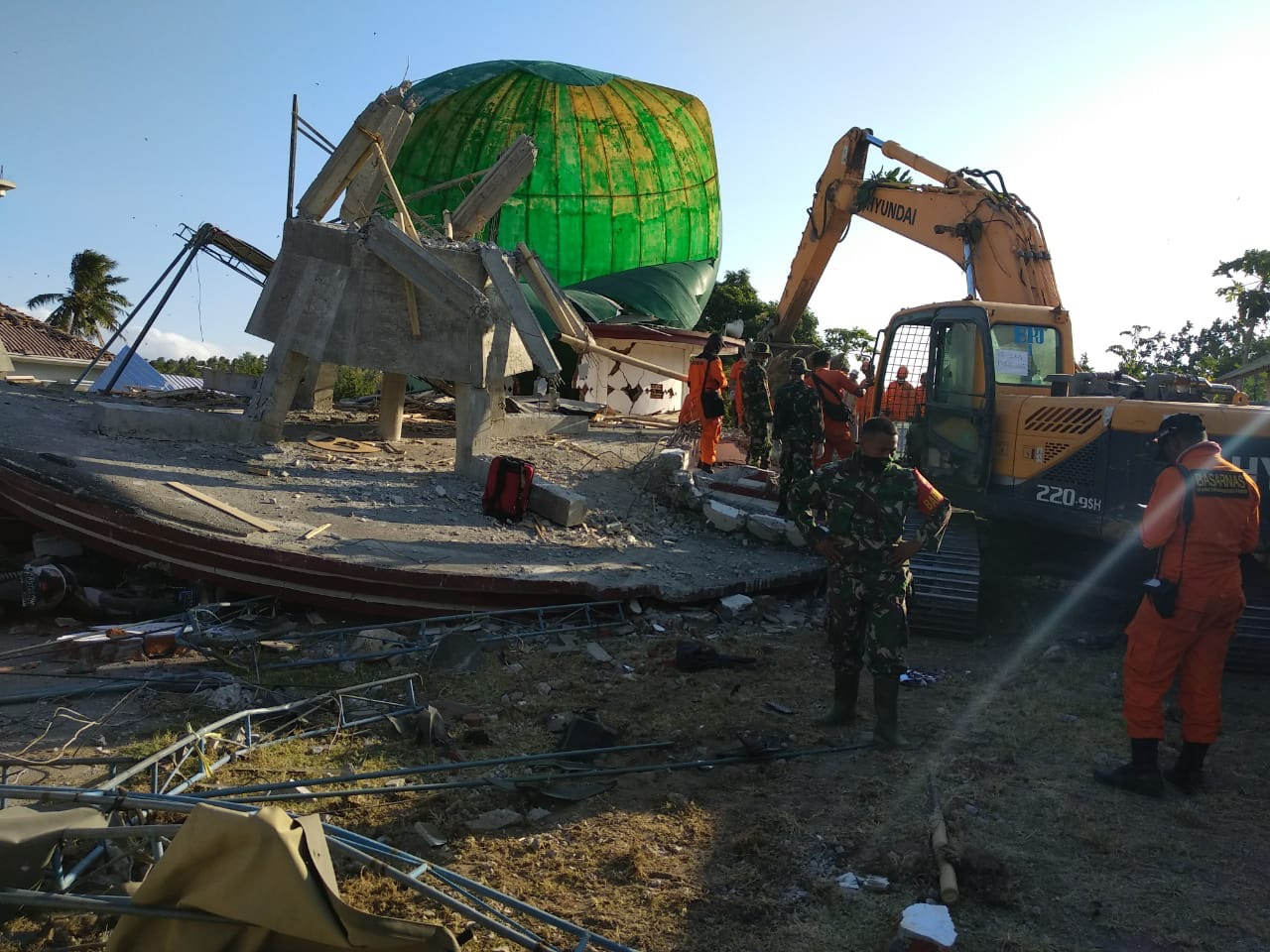
A mosque collapsed by the 5 August 2018 Lombok earthquake

| Date | Country and location | M_{w} | Depth (km) | MMI | Notes | Casualties | |
| Date | Country and location | M_{w} | Depth (km) | MMI | Notes | Dead | Injured |
|---|---|---|---|---|---|---|---|
| 5 | Indonesia, Lombok, 36 km northwest of Labuan Lombok | 6.9 | 34.0 | VIII | During the 5 August 2018 Lombok earthquake, major additional damage was caused in the aftermath of the 6.4 jolt on July 28, with numerous buildings collapsing. A total blackout occurred on Lombok Island and some damage was reported on neighboring Bali. 513 people were killed, including two on Bali, and more than 1,000 injured. | 513 | 1,353 |
| 9 | Indonesia, Lombok, 17 km east northeast of Gili Air | 5.9 | 15.0 | VI | It was an aftershock of the 5 August 2018 Lombok earthquake. Some buildings collapsed, killing six people and injuring 24 others. Landslides also occurred. | 6 | 24 |
| 10 | Russia, Kuril Islands, 261 km south southwest of Severo-Kurilsk | 6.0 | 27.0 | IV | – | – | – |
| 11 | Albania, 8 km east southeast of Burrel | 5.1 | 10.0 | V | 67 houses were damaged in Dibër County. | – | – |
| 12 | United States, Alaska, 89 km southwest of Kaktovik | 6.4 | 15.8 | VII | Strongest earthquake ever to hit the Alaska North Slope. | – | – |
| 12 | United States, Alaska, 73 km south southwest of Kaktovik | 6.0 | 16.2 | VII | It was an aftershock of the 6.3 quake earlier that day. | – | – |
| 12 | China, 37 km east of Yuxi | 5.0 | 10.0 | VI | Over 6,000 homes were damaged in the city of Yuxi, and 24 people were treated for their injuries. | – | 24 |
| 14 | South Georgia and the South Sandwich Islands, 126 km northeast of Bristol Island | 6.1 | 25.0 | IV | - | - | - |
| 15 | United States, Alaska, Aleutian Islands, 108 km west southwest of Adak | 6.5 | 33.9 | VI | - | – | – |
| 16 | Italy, 2 km southeast of Palata | 5.3 | 11.6 | VI | Some damage was reported near the epicenter, including cracks in walls and fallen chimneys. One woman in Larino suffered a head injury caused by falling bricks, while in Montecilfone, another was injured by falling debris. | – | 2 |
| 16 | Japan, Volcano Islands, 250 km southeast of Iwo Jima | 6.3 | 20.0 | III | - | – | – |
| 17 | Indonesia, Flores Sea, 124 km north of Labuan Bajo | 6.5 | 529.0 | III | - | – | – |
| 17 | Costa Rica, 19 km north northwest of Golfito | 6.1 | 15.0 | VI | In places, power was knocked out and power poles were toppled. | – | – |
| 19 | Fiji, 267 km east of Levuka | 8.2 | 600.0 | IV | The 2018 Fiji earthquake is the largest earthquake in 2018, and the biggest ever recorded in Fiji. Because of its depth, no damage was reported, but small tsunami waves were observed. | – | – |
| 19 | Fiji, 259 km north northeast of Ndoi Island | 6.3 | 575.8 | II | It was an aftershock of the 8.2 quake earlier that day. | – | – |
| 19 | Indonesia, Lombok, 19 km north northwest of Labuan Lombok | 6.3 | 16.0 | VI | It was an aftershock of the 5 August 2018 Lombok earthquake. More buildings were damaged in East Lombok and landslides occurred on Mount Rinjani. Two people died of heart attacks and three were injured. | 2 | 3 |
| 19 | Fiji, 284 km east southeast of Labasa | 6.4 | 415.6 | III | It was an aftershock of the 8.2 quake earlier that day. | – | – |
| 19 | Indonesia, Lombok, 20 km north northwest of Labuan Lombok | 6.9 | 21.0 | VII | The 19 August 2018 Lombok earthquake was caused by a new but related fault. Buildings already damaged by the mainshock on August 5 collapsed and more buildings were damaged. At least 14 people were killed and 24 others injured. | 14 | 24 |
| 21 | Venezuela, 40 km east northeast of Carúpano | 7.3 | 146.8 | VII | The August 2018 Venezuela earthquake was one of the largest earthquakes ever to strike Venezuela; it was felt as far away as Bogotá, Colombia and Paramaribo, Suriname. In Caracas, people were evacuated from buildings. Some damage was caused in Sucre and the neighbouring country of Trinidad and Tobago. Five people died of heart attacks. | 5 | 122 |
| 21 | Vanuatu, 78 km east of Lakatoro | 6.5 | 9.0 | VII | Many buildings were damaged on Pentecost island. One woman injured after a fall. | – | 1 |
| 22 | United States, Oregon offshore, 272 km west of Bandon | 6.2 | 10.0 | IV | - | – | – |
| 23 | United States, Alaska, Aleutian Islands, 97 km southwest of Adak | 6.3 | 20.0 | V | It was an aftershock of the 6.6 quake on August 15. | – | – |
| 24 | Peru, 136 km west of Iñapari | 7.1 | 630.0 | III | Felt in western Brazil, many areas of Peru and Bolivia, and northern Chile. | – | – |
| 25 | Iran, 32 km southwest of Javanrud | 6.0 | 10.0 | VII | Damage was caused in Kermanshah region. Three people were killed and more than 200 others injured. | 3 | 243 |
| 28 | Indonesia offshore, 92 km southeast of Kupang | 6.2 | 14.0 | IV | - | – | – |
| 28 | Northern Mariana Islands offshore, 211 km north northeast of Saipan | 6.4 | 55.0 | IV | - | – | – |
| 28 | India, West Bengal, 6 km east northeast of Ghatal | 4.5 | 10.0 | VI | Cracks appeared in several houses, while in Egra, a two-story apartment partially collapsed. No injuries were reported. | – | – |
| 29 | New Caledonia, Loyalty Islands offshore, 238 km east southeast of Tadine | 7.1 | 21.4 | V | Small tsunami waves were observed around the Loyalty Islands, with maximum wave heights of 50 cm (1.6 ft). | – | – |

=== September ===
September
- Strongest: 7.9 M_{w} Fiji
- Deadliest: 7.5 M_{w} (Indonesia) Indonesia; 4,340 deaths
- Total fatalities: 4,384

Number by magnitude
- 8.0–8.9: 0
- 7.0–7.9: 2
- 6.0–6.9: 10
- 5.0–5.9: 174
- 4.0–4.9: 1,193

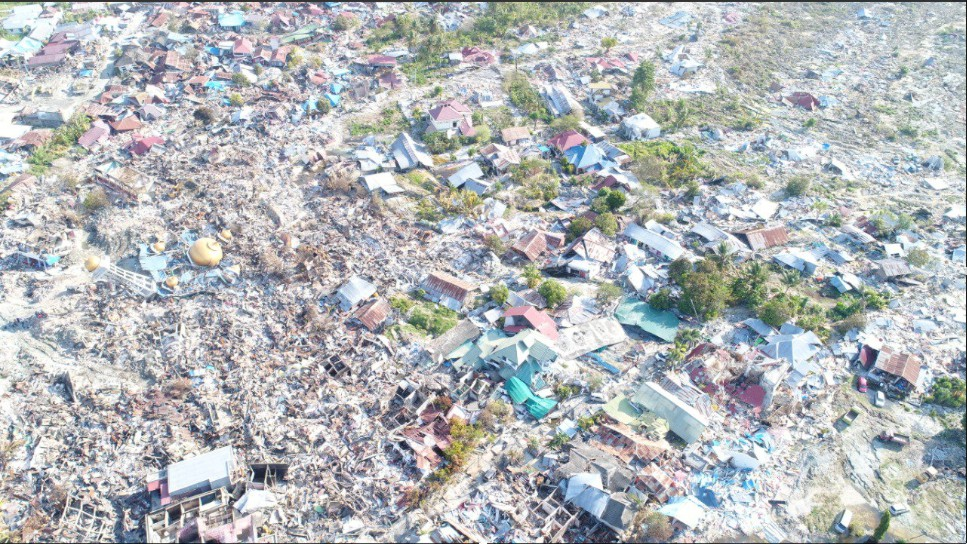
Balaroa, Palu, was obliterated by the soil liquefaction that followed immediately after the earthquake

| Date | Country and location | M_{w} | Depth (km) | MMI | Notes | Casualties | |
| Date | Country and location | M_{w} | Depth (km) | MMI | Notes | Dead | Injured |
|---|---|---|---|---|---|---|---|
| 4 | Russia, 15 km west northwest of Katav-Ivanovsk | 5.0 | 10.0 | VI | Various buildings sustained damage in Chelyabinsk region. Schools were closed and social facilities disrupted. | – | – |
| 5 | Japan, Hokkaido, 27 km east southeast of Chitose | 6.6 | 35.0 | X | During the 2018 Hokkaido Eastern Iburi earthquake, many buildings collapsed near the epicenter, and landslides buried houses in the city of Atsuma. 41 people died, and 691 people injured. The earthquake triggered a massive blackout throughout the island of Hokkaido. | 41 | 691 |
| 6 | Fiji, 45 km south of Levuka | 7.9 | 670.8 | IV | 2018 Fiji earthquake | - | - |
| 7 | Ecuador, 8 km southeast of Alausí | 6.2 | 110.5 | V | Some structural damage was caused to buildings and power was cut. Two people were injured. | – | 2 |
| 7 | Iran, 127 km southeast of Bam | 5.6 | 10.0 | VII | Houses were damaged in several villages. One person was killed and two were injured. | 1 | 2 |
| 8 | China, 110 km south southeast of Jianshui | 5.7 | 8.0 | VII | More than 29,000 houses and 34 schools were damaged in Yunnan province, as well as roads and bridges. 28 people were injured, and 5,000 others relocated. | – | 28 |
| 8 | Philippines, 7 km west northwest of Manay | 6.2 | 10.0 | VII | Several houses were damaged in Manay. | – | – |
| 9 | Solomon Islands, 66 km northwest of Kirakira | 6.5 | 68.0 | VI | - | – | – |
| 10 | New Zealand, Kermadec Islands offshore, 61 km southwest of L'Esperance Rock | 6.9 | 115.0 | IV | - | – | – |
| 10 | New Caledonia, Loyalty Islands offshore, 240 km east southeast of Tadine | 6.3 | 12.0 | IV | It was an aftershock of the 7.1 quake on August 29. | - | - |
| 12 | India, 5 km northeast of Sapatgram | 5.3 | 10.0 | VI | One person died and 25 others were injured while getting down from several buildings in Uttara EPZ. | 1 | 25 |
| 16 | Tonga offshore, south of the Fiji Islands | 6.5 | 576.0 | I | - | - | - |
| 18 | Southwest Indian Ridge | 6.0 | 10.0 | I | - | - | - |
| 28 | Indonesia, Sulawesi, 57 km north northwest of Palu | 6.1 | 5.0 | VII | One person died and 10 people were injured. It was a foreshock of the 7.5 quake 3 hours later. A tsunami warning was initially issued, but lifted within an hour. | 1 | 10 |
| 28 | Indonesia, Sulawesi, 72 km north of Palu | 7.5 | 20.0 | X | Following the 2018 Sulawesi earthquake and tsunami, the Indonesian Agency for Meteorology, Climatology and Geophysics (BMKG) confirmed that a tsunami had occurred, with a height of around 5 to 7 metres (16 to 23 ft), striking the settlements of Palu, Donggala and Mamuju. The earthquake also caused many buildings to collapse, including hotels, and liquefaction was observed. 4,340 people were estimated to have been killed. This was the deadliest earthquake in 2018. | 4,340 | 10,679 |
| 30 | Fiji offshore, 279 km east of Levuka | 6.7 | 550.0 | III | It was an aftershock of the 8.2 quake on August 19. | - | - |

=== October ===
October
- Strongest: 7.0 M_{w} Papua New Guinea
- Deadliest: 5.9 M_{w} (Haiti) Haiti; 18 deaths
- Total fatalities: 23

Number by magnitude
- 8.0–8.9: 0
- 7.0–7.9: 1
- 6.0–6.9: 16
- 5.0–5.9: 173
- 4.0–4.9: 1,224

| Date | Country and location | M_{w} | Depth (km) | MMI | Notes | Casualties | |
| Date | Country and location | M_{w} | Depth (km) | MMI | Notes | Dead | Injured |
|---|---|---|---|---|---|---|---|
| 1 | Indonesia, East Nusa Tenggara offshore, 99 km south of Waingapu | 6.0 | 29.0 | V | Many buildings were damaged in Sumba. In the island of Halura, close to the epicenter, extensive damage occurred, with some houses in the only settlement on the island collapsing. | – | – |
| 6 | Italy, Sicily, 2 km south southwest of Gravina di Catania | 4.6 | 10.0 | V | Buildings and roads were damaged near the epicenter. Around 40 people sustained injuries. | – | ~40 |
| 7 | Haiti, 21 km west northwest of Port-de-Paix | 5.9 | 24.0 | VI | During the 2018 Haiti earthquake, serious damage was caused in northern parts of the island, where buildings collapsed, especially in Port-de-Paix. The earthquake killed 18 people and injured more than 500. Shaking was felt as far away as Port-au-Prince. | 18 | 548 |
| 9 | Russia, Kuril Islands offshore, 142 km south of Severo-Kuril'sk | 6.1 | 19.0 | IV | It was a foreshock of the 6.5 quake on October 10. | – | – |
| 10 | Indonesia, Java offshore, 49 km northeast of Panji | 6.0 | 9.0 | V | During the 2018 East Java earthquake, some buildings collapsed on the island of Madura. Four people died, trapped in the rubble, and 36 others suffered injuries. | 4 | 36 |
| 10 | Papua New Guinea, 136 km east of Kimbe | 6.1 | 41.6 | V | It was a foreshock of the 7.0 quake less than 3 minutes later. | – | – |
| 10 | Papua New Guinea, 119 km east of Kimbe | 7.0 | 39.0 | VI | Moderate damage was caused and one person was killed in New Britain. | 1 | – |
| 10 | Papua New Guinea, 91 km southwest of Kokopo | 6.2 | 121.0 | V | It was an aftershock of the 7.0 quake earlier that day. | – | – |
| 10 | Russia, Kuril Islands offshore, 154 km south of Severo-Kuril'sk | 6.5 | 20.0 | IV | – | – | – |
| 13 | Russia, Kamchatka offshore, 269 km northwest of Ozernovskiy | 6.7 | 461.0 | III | – | – | – |
| 16 | New Caledonia, Loyalty Islands offshore, 171 km east southeast of Tadine | 6.3 | 12.0 | IV | It was a foreshock of the 6.4 quake later that day. | – | – |
| 16 | New Caledonia, Loyalty Islands offshore, 171 km east of Tadine | 6.5 | 17.0 | IV | – | – | – |
| 22 | Canada, Vancouver Island offshore, 223 km southwest of Port McNeill | 6.5 | 10.0 | IV | It was a foreshock of the 6.8 quake; struck a few minutes before. | – | – |
| 22 | Canada, Vancouver Island offshore, 210 km southwest of Port McNeill | 6.8 | 10.0 | IV | – | – | – |
| 22 | Canada, Vancouver Island offshore, 237 km southwest of Port McNeill | 6.5 | 10.0 | IV | It was an aftershock of the 6.8 quake; struck a few minutes after. | – | – |
| 25 | Greece offshore, 32 km southwest of Lithakiá | 6.8 | 14.0 | VII | During the 2018 Ionian Sea earthquake, a 15th century monastery was damaged and cracks on walls appeared in Zakynthos. Three people were slightly injured. The quake was felt as far away as Southern Italy. | – | 3 |
| 27 | Peru, Puno region, 48 km southwest of Ayaviri | 4.5 | 16.0 | | Twelve houses were destroyed and 45 others damaged in Ocuviri district. No injuries were reported. | - | - |
| 28 | Romania, Buzău, 15 km southeast of Comandău | 5.5 | 151.0 | IV | 15 people were injured due to panic attacks. | – | 15 |
| 28 | El Salvador offshore, 85 km southwest of Acajutla | 6.1 | 22.0 | IV | – | – | – |
| 29 | Drake Passage | 6.3 | 10.0 | IV | – | – | – |
| 30 | New Zealand, 62 km east of Waitara | 6.1 | 225.5 | IV | – | – | – |
| 31 | China, Sichuan, 12 km south southwest of Xichang | 5.1 | 24.3 | III | Three houses were destroyed and 777 others were damaged in the epicentral area. Four people were injured. | – | 4 |

=== November ===
November
- Strongest: 7.1 M_{w} United States
- Deadliest: 5.6 M_{w} Indonesia; 7 deaths
- Total fatalities: 8

Number by magnitude
- 8.0–8.9: 0
- 7.0–7.9: 1
- 6.0–6.9: 13
- 5.0–5.9: 104
- 4.0–4.9: 1,042

| Date | Country and location | M_{w} | Depth (km) | MMI | Notes | Casualties | |
| Date | Country and location | M_{w} | Depth (km) | MMI | Notes | Dead | Injured |
|---|---|---|---|---|---|---|---|
| 1 | Chile, 115 km northeast of Iquique | 6.2 | 102.0 | VI | – | – | – |
| 2 | Russia, 298 km east of Dolinsk | 6.0 | 433.0 | II | – | – | – |
| 4 | Philippines, 10 km south southeast of Sapad, Lanao del Norte | 6.0 | 600.7 | II | – | – | – |
| 5 | Philippines, 3 km southwest of Buga | 4.9 | 55.9 | V | It was the biggest of 12 earthquakes affecting the area on November 5, 2018. Moderate cracks were found in the Iloilo Provincial Engineering Office and an Elementary School in Guimbal as well as a section of Tubungan Belfry falling. One pupil was injured after a ceiling beam fell on her while evacuating during the earthquake. | – | 1 |
| 9 | Norway, Svalbard and Jan Mayen, Jan Mayen offshore, 120 km northwest of Olonkinbyen | 6.7 | 10.0 | IV | – | – | – |
| 10 | Tonga, 79 km south southeast of Pangai | 6.1 | 35.0 | IV | – | – | – |
| 11 | North Atlantic Ocean | 6.3 | 10.0 | I | – | – | – |
| 14 | Russia, Kamchatka, 71 km south southwest of Ust'-Kamchatsk Staryy | 6.1 | 49.0 | VI | – | – | – |
| 14 | Indonesia, Sulawesi, 56 km west of Rantepao | 5.5 | 14.0 | VII | Landslides buried at least eight houses in Mamasa regency. Seven people were killed during the evacuation, and 8,000 fled their homes. | 7 | – |
| 15 | South Georgia and the South Sandwich Islands, 111 km east of Visokoi Island | 6.4 | 15.0 | IV | – | – | – |
| 15 | Eltanin Fracture Zone, East Pacific Rise | 6.3 | 10.0 | I | – | – | – |
| 16 | Solomon Islands offshore, 136 km east of Kirakira | 6.2 | 10.0 | IV | – | – | – |
| 18 | Fiji, 187 km east of Levuka | 6.8 | 540.0 | III | – | – | – |
| 20 | Peru offshore, 47 km south southwest of Puerto Casma | 5.5 | 57.4 | IV | Some adobe houses sustained damage in Áncash Region. Twelve people were injured, including three children. | – | 12 |
| 24 | Venezuela, 7 km west of Valera | 5.2 | 18.9 | VI | Around ten houses were damaged in Trujillo state. One of them was totally destroyed, leaving two inhabitants injured. | – | 2 |
| 25 | Colombia, San Andrés y Providencia offshore, 36 km southeast of Mountain | 6.0 | 10.0 | V | – | – | – |
| 25 | Iran, 15 km southwest of Sarpol-e Zahab | 6.3 | 18.0 | VI | The 2018 Sarpol-e Zahab earthquake caused damage to parts of both Iran and Iraq. More than 700 people were injured in Iran, and one person died in Iraq because of the tremor. | 1 | 761 |
| 28 | Afghanistan, 15 km south of Pul-e Khumri | 4.9 | 21.8 | V | 60 homes were damaged or destroyed in northern Baghlan. Nine people were wounded as a result of the tremor. | – | 9 |
| 30 | United States, Alaska, 1 km southeast of Point MacKenzie | 7.1 | 46.7 | VIII | Following the 2018 Anchorage earthquake, severe damage was reported in the municipality. The airport was damaged, as well as many roads and buildings. No fatalities were reported, but 117 people were injured. | – | 117 |

=== December ===
December
- Strongest: 7.5 M_{w} New Caledonia
- Total fatalities: 0

Number by magnitude
- 9.0+: 0
- 8.0–8.9: 0
- 7.0–7.9: 4
- 6.0–6.9: 10
- 5.0–5.9: 176
- 4.0–4.9: 1,248

| Date | Country and location | M_{w} | Depth (km) | MMI | Notes | Casualties | |
| Date | Country and location | M_{w} | Depth (km) | MMI | Notes | Dead | Injured |
|---|---|---|---|---|---|---|---|
| 1 | Indonesia offshore, 226 km northeast of Lospalos, Timor Leste | 6.4 | 136.0 | IV | – | - | – |
| 5 | New Caledonia, Loyalty Islands offshore, 160 km east southeast of Tadine | 6.3 | 10.0 | IV | It was a foreshock of the 7.5 quake a few minutes later. | - | – |
| 5 | New Caledonia, Loyalty Islands offshore, 166 km east southeast of Tadine | 7.5 | 10.0 | VI | A tsunami warning was issued for New Caledonia, then lifted. A 2 meter high surge damaged a school and other buildings in the island of Aneityum in Vanuatu. | - | – |
| 5 | New Caledonia, Loyalty Islands offshore, 199 km east southeast of Tadine | 6.6 | 10.0 | IV | It was an aftershock of the 7.5 quake earlier that day. | – | – |
| 6 | Indonesia, Lombok, 8 km west southwest of Gili Air | 5.5 | 12.0 | V | Some damage was caused. At least three people were injured, one of them after being hit by a falling roof tile. | – | 3 |
| 11 | South Georgia and the South Sandwich Islands, 48 km north of Bristol Island | 7.1 | 133.0 | V | - | – | – |
| 12 | Pacific-Antarctic Ridge | 6.3 | 10.0 | I | - | - | - |
| 16 | China, Sichuan, 34 km east southeast of Xunchang | 5.3 | 18.6 | VI | Over 10,800 houses were damaged in Xingwen county. Seventeen people were injured. | – | 16 |
| 16 | Vanuatu, 82 km east southeast of Lakatoro | 5.5 | 9.0 | VI | This earthquake was the strongest of an earthquake swarm in the Ambrym region. It caused a lot of damage to some buildings. | – | – |
| 16 | Indonesia, Papua, 153 km south southwest of Abepura | 6.1 | 62.0 | V | - | - | - |
| 19 | Chile offshore, southeast of Easter Island | 6.3 | 10.0 | I | - | - | - |
| 20 | Russia, Komandorski Islands offshore, 187 km southeast of Ust'-Kamchatsk Staryy | 7.3 | 16.6 | VII | - | - | - |
| 22 | Mozambique, 53 km south southeast of Chipinge, Zimbabwe | 5.6 | 16.0 | VII | 11 people were injured and 108 houses destroyed in Mozambique, while in Zimbabwe, about 40 homesteads were affected in Manicaland Province after the tremor. | – | 11 |
| 22 | Vanuatu offshore, 95 km west northwest of Sola | 6.0 | 42.0 | V | – | – | – |
| 23 | Tonga offshore, 91 km north of Pangai | 6.4 | 113.0 | V | – | – | – |
| 24 | Russia, Komandorski Islands offshore, 161 km southeast of Ust'-Kamchatsk Staryy | 6.1 | 10.0 | IV | It was an aftershock of the 7.3 quake on December 20. | – | – |
| 26 | Italy, Sicily, 1 km south southwest of Lavinaio-Monterosso | 5.0 | 1.0 | VII | Various buildings and a church were damaged. Thirty people were wounded. This earthquake occurred at the time of an eruption of Mount Etna. | – | 30 |
| 27 | Venezuela, 5 km northwest of Guacara | 5.4 | 8.0 | VI | Some houses were seriously damaged in Carabobo. | – | – |
| 29 | Philippines offshore, 96 km east southeast of Pundaguitan | 7.0 | 60.2 | V | – | – | – |
| 31 | United States, Alaska offshore, 87 km southeast of King Cove | 6.0 | 31.0 | IV | – | – | – |
