= 2018 Alaska earthquake =

2018 Alaska earthquake may refer to:

- 2018 Gulf of Alaska earthquake, on January 23
- 2018 Anchorage earthquake, on November 30
