= Anchorage earthquake =

The Anchorage earthquake may refer to:

- 1964 Anchorage earthquake
- 2018 Anchorage earthquake
