= 2018 Haiti earthquake =

5.9 magnitude earthquake in Port-de-Paix, Haiti

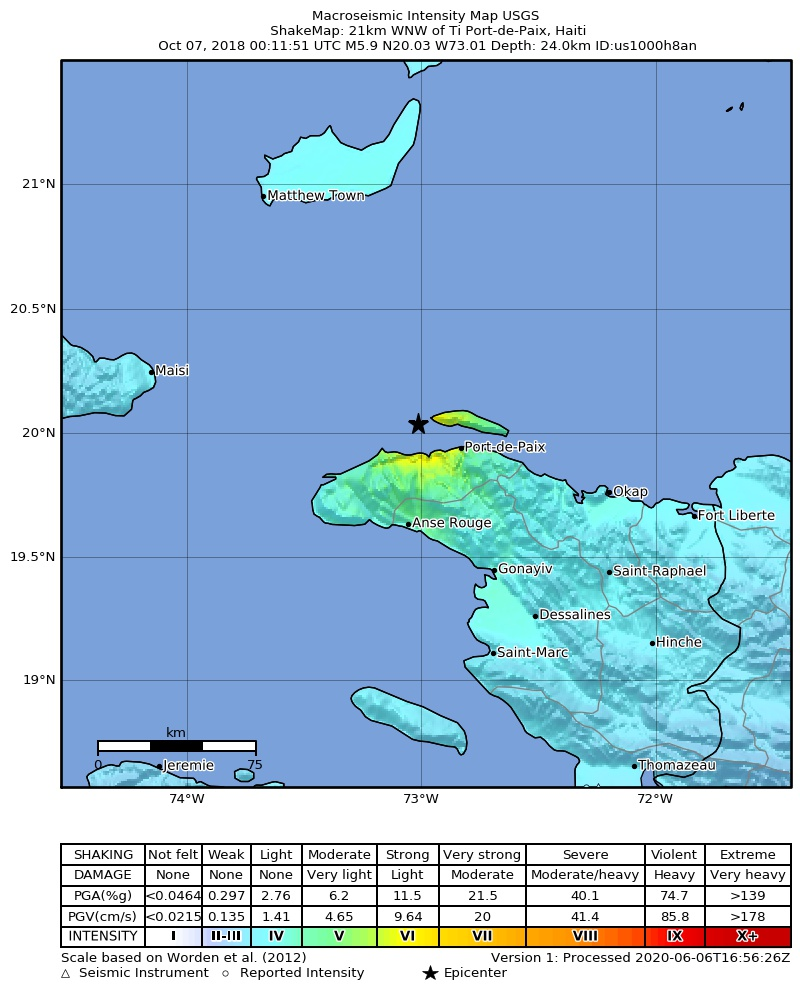

- Location within Haiti
- UTC time: 2018-10-07 00:11:49
- ISC event: 612859723
- USGS-ANSS: ComCat
- Local date: October 6, 2018
- Local time: 20:11:49 (UTC−05:00)
- Magnitude: 5.9 M_{ww}
- Depth: 24.0 km (15 mi)
- Epicenter: 20.041°N 72.975°W
- Areas affected: Haiti, Dominican Republic
- Max. intensity: MMI VI (Strong)
- Tsunami: No
- Aftershocks: 2
- Casualties: 18 dead; 548 injured

On October 6, 2018, at approximately 8:11 p.m, a magnitude 5.9 earthquake struck 19 kilometers northwest of Port-de-Paix, Haiti. The earthquake damaged structures and killed 18 people.

The earthquake was the strongest to hit Haiti since January 12, 2010, not including the aftershocks of the 2010 earthquake, and the shaking was felt as far away as Port-au-Prince.

== Tectonic setting ==
Haiti lies at the boundary between the Caribbean plate and North American plate. Movement across this boundary is partitioned across several major structures. The major left-lateral strike slip fault zones of the Septentrional-Oriente fault zone and the Enriquillo–Plantain Garden fault zone together accommodate the lateral component of this movement. North of Haiti, the overall deformation is transpressional in nature and an additional structure, the North Hispaniola Fault, a major thrust zone, takes up the component of convergence at a rate of 5 mm per year.

== Damage ==
The earthquake caused part of a school to collapse in Gros-Morne, damaged the façade of the Paroisse St. Michel A De Plaisance church in Plaisance, caused a cultural center to collapse in Gros-Morne, damaged a holding cell at the Police Nationale d'Haiti Commissariat de Port-de-Paix in Port-de-Paix, allowing several detainees to escape, caused an auditorium to collapse in Gros-Morne, damaged several classrooms at San Gabriel National School in Gros-Morne, and destroyed houses in the communes of Chansolme, Gros-Morne, Plaisance, and Port-de-Paix as well as on the island of Tortuga.

Overall, a total of 2,102 houses were destroyed, and a further 15,932 were damaged.

== Casualties ==
The earthquake killed 18 people and 548 people were injured. Nine of the deaths occurred in Port-de-Paix, seven in Gros-Morne and one in Saint-Louis du Nord.

== Response ==
President Jovenel Moïse instructed residents to stay calm and stated that authorities would be responding to those who need help.

Prime Minister Jean-Henry Céant said that a cabinet had been created to help organize the emergency response.

The day after the earthquake, President Moïse visited Port-de-Paix de oversee the recovery efforts.

== Aftershocks ==
There have been two aftershocks since the initial earthquake struck. A magnitude 5.2 event occurred nearly 20 hours after the mainshock, with another magnitude 4.2 event happening about 5 hours later.

In the first 8 months of 2018, there were 26 earthquakes between the magnitudes of 2.9 and 4.6 recorded.

== See also ==
- List of earthquakes in 2018
- List of earthquakes in Haiti
- 2021 Haiti earthquake
