= 2018 Oaxaca earthquake =

Natural event in Mexico

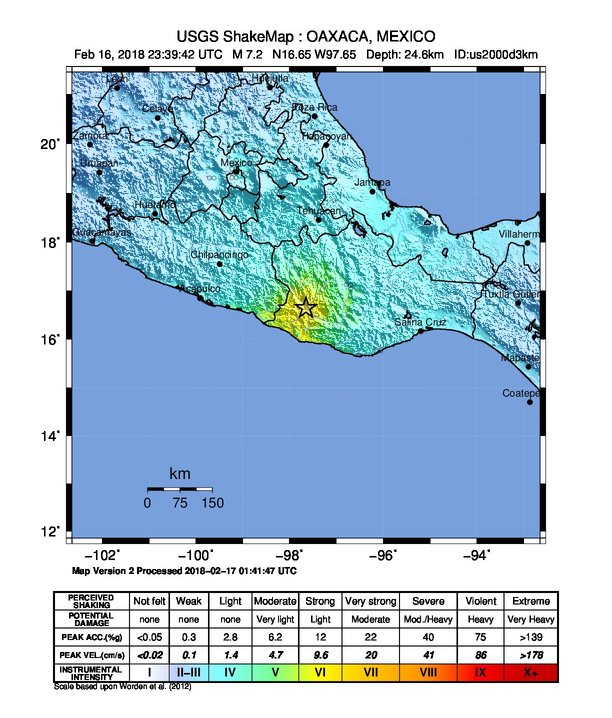

- Location within Oaxaca Location within Mexico
- UTC time: 2018-02-16 23:39:39
- ISC event: 611835996
- USGS-ANSS: ComCat
- Local date: February 16, 2018
- Local time: 17:39
- Magnitude: 7.2 M_{w}
- Depth: 24.6 km (15.3 mi)
- Epicenter: 16.386°N 97.979°W
- Type: Thrust
- Max. intensity: MMI VII (Very strong)
- Casualties: 14 dead (indirect), 17 injured (15 indirect)

The 2018 Oaxaca earthquake occurred on February 16, 2018, at 17:39 local time (23:39 UTC) in the Sierra Madre del Sur mountains in Oaxaca state in Southern Mexico. It had a magnitude of 7.2 on the moment magnitude scale and a maximum felt intensity of VII (Very strong) on the Mercalli intensity scale. The hypocenter was located at a depth of 24.6 km and approximately 37 km northeast of Pinotepa de Don Luis. There were only two reports of injuries from the earthquake, but later a military helicopter surveying the damage crashed and killed 14 people. There were also 15 people injured.

== Tectonic summary ==
Magnitude of 2018 Oaxaca earthquake

Map of 2018 Oaxaca earthquake

Oaxaca lies on the destructive plate boundary where the Cocos plate is being subducted beneath the North American plate. In the region of this earthquake, the Cocos plate moves approximately northeastward at a rate of 60 mm/yr. The earthquake occurred as a result of thrust faulting at a shallow depth. The depth and focal mechanism solutions of the event are consistent with its occurrence on the subduction zone interface between these plates, approximately 90 km northeast of the Middle America Trench.

Historically, several significant earthquakes have occurred along the southern coast of Mexico. In 1932, a M 8.4 megathrust earthquake struck in the region of Jalisco, several hundred kilometers to the northwest of the Oaxaca event. On October 9, 1995, a M 8.0 earthquake struck in the Colima-Jalisco region, resulting in at least 49 fatalities and leaving 1,000 people homeless. The deadliest nearby earthquake occurred on September 19, 1985, in the Michoacán region 500 km to the northwest of the February 16th event. This M 8.0 earthquake resulted in at least 9,500 fatalities, injured about 30,000 people, and left 100,000 people homeless. In 2003, a M 7.6 earthquake in Colima, Mexico, resulted in 29 fatalities, destroyed more than 2,000 homes and left more than 10,000 people homeless. In March 2012, a M 7.4 earthquake 60 km to the northwest of the February 16, 2018, event killed 2 and injured 11 in the Oaxaca region. The hypocenter of the M 8.2 earthquake off the shore of Chiapas in September 2017 was located 440 km southwest of this earthquake. The Chiapas event caused at least 78 fatalities and 250 injuries in Oaxaca, and a further 16 deaths in Chiapas. Eleven days later, a M 7.1 earthquake struck closer to Mexico City, 230 km northeast of today's earthquake, resulting in over 300 fatalities and significant damage in Mexico City and the surrounding region.

A second quake, registering 5.9, struck Oaxaca on February 19, 2018, around 12:57 AM local time. The quake, believed to be an aftershock, had an epicenter about 69 miles southwest of Oaxaca City; its impact was registered in Mexico City. No deaths were reported from this quake.

== Helicopter crash ==
2018 Mexican Air Force Sikorsky UH-60M crash
- A UH-60M, owned by the United States Army, similar to the one involved in the accident

Accident
- Date: February 16, 2018
- Summary: Loss of control on landing
- Site: Santiago Jamiltepec, Oaxaca State, Mexico

Aircraft
- Aircraft type: Sikorsky UH-60M Black Hawk
- Operator: Mexican Air Force
- Registration: 1071
- Passengers: 3
- Crew: 1
- Fatalities: 0
- Injuries: 0
- Survivors: 4

Ground casualties
- Ground fatalities: 14
- Ground injuries: 15

Alejandro Murat Hinojosa, the Governor of Oaxaca, was in Tuxtepec at the time the earthquake struck and immediately left to survey the damage in Pinotepa Nacional with Alfonso Navarrete Prida, who had become the Secretary of the Interior the month before. The Sikorsky UH-60M Black Hawk military helicopter in which Murat and Navarrete, along with the state head of civil protection and one other person, were traveling, crashed in Santiago Jamiltepec while attempting to land nearby when the pilot lost control of the aircraft. The helicopter crashed on two cars that were parked in a field, where a family was spending the night outside after the earthquake. A total of 14 people, all of them on the ground, were killed, and 15 others were injured. All four people on board the helicopter survived unharmed.

== See also ==
- List of earthquakes in 2018
- List of earthquakes in Mexico
