= 2018 Swan Islands earthquake =

- Location within Central America
- UTC time: 2018-01-10 02:51:31
- ISC event: 611634051
- USGS-ANSS: ComCat
- Local date: January 9, 2018
- Local time: 20:51:31 PM CST
- Magnitude: 7.5 M_{ww}
- Depth: 19.0 km (11.8 mi)
- Epicenter: 17.469°N 83.520°W
- Type: Strike-slip
- Areas affected: Honduras; Guatemala; Belize; Cayman Islands
- Max. intensity: MMI VII (Very strong)
- Casualties: None

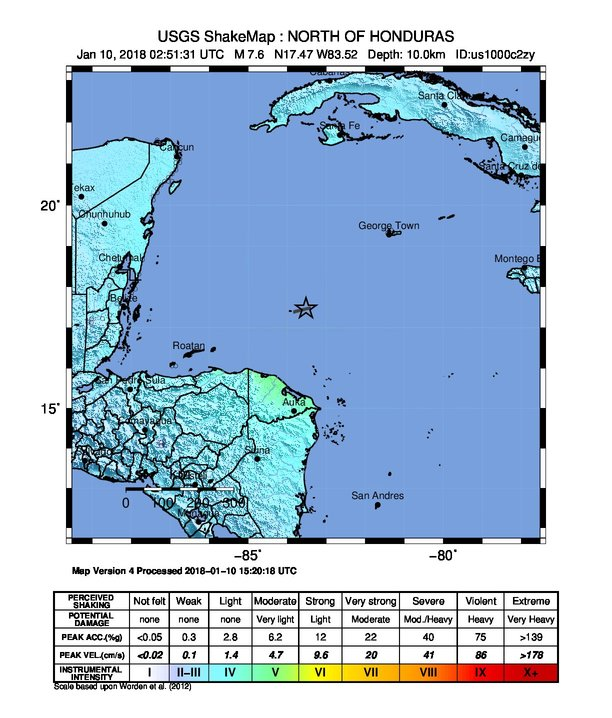
Shakemap of the earthquake

On 9 January 2018, at approximately 8:51 p.m. local time (02:51:10 January UTC), a magnitude 7.5 earthquake struck in the Yucatán Basin of the Caribbean Sea, 44 kilometres (27 mi) east of Great Swan Island off the coast of Honduras. The earthquake was felt across Central America, and rattled windows in Tegucigalpa. The earthquake was also felt in the Cayman Islands.

Tsunami advisories were issued for certain areas by the U.S. Tsunami Warning Center. They were later cancelled after further monitoring. No tsunami was generated since the earthquake was an almost pure strike-slip on a near vertical plane, producing little upward movement of the sea floor that would cause a large displacement of water.

== Earthquake ==
The earthquake occurred at a depth of around 10 kilometres (6.2 mi) on a transform fault zone known as the Swan Islands Transform Fault in the Cayman Trough, where it forms part of the boundary between the North American plate and the Caribbean plate. The area just to the west also produced a large earthquake in 2009 that measured 7.3 on the moment magnitude scale. According to a finite fault model created by the U.S. Geological Survey, the earthquake generated a maximum slip of 24 meters in a compact rupture zone. Three sub-events were discovered during the rupture process, the third of which, occurred at a velocity exceeding that of the shear wave. Propagating at 5 km/s, faster than the shear wave velocity of 4 km/s, the event is classified as a supershear earthquake.

=== Damage ===
No major damage was reported. However some homes suffered cracks in walls.

== Tsunami ==
A tsunami was observed with maximum heights of 0.4 m (1.3 ft) in Roatan Island, Honduras. A 0.2 m (0.66 ft) surge was observed in George Town, Cayman Islands.

== See also ==
- List of earthquakes in 2018
- List of earthquakes in the Caribbean
