= 2018 Osaka earthquake =

5.6 Mw earthquake in Japan

2018 northern Osaka earthquake
- 大阪府北部地震
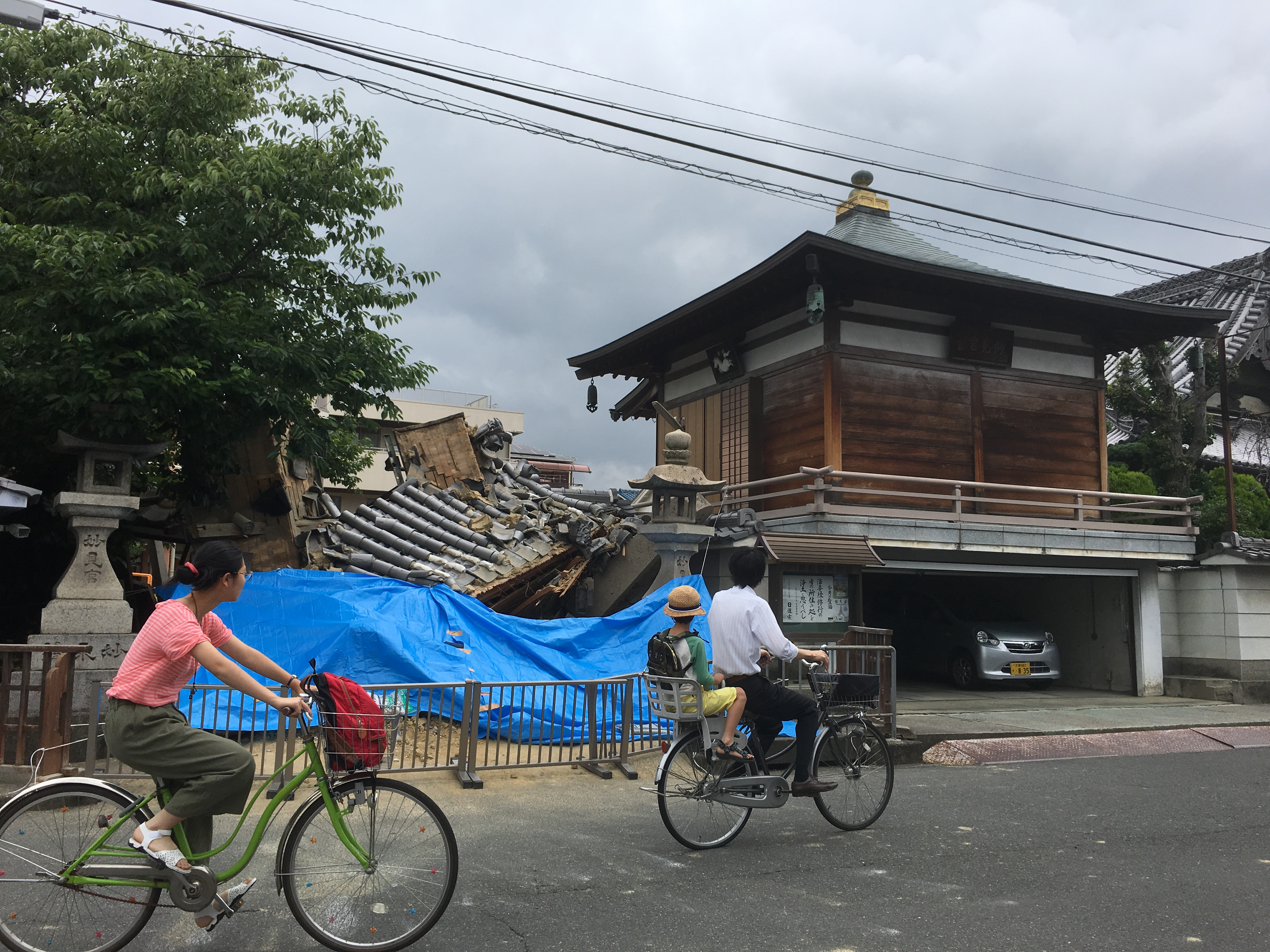

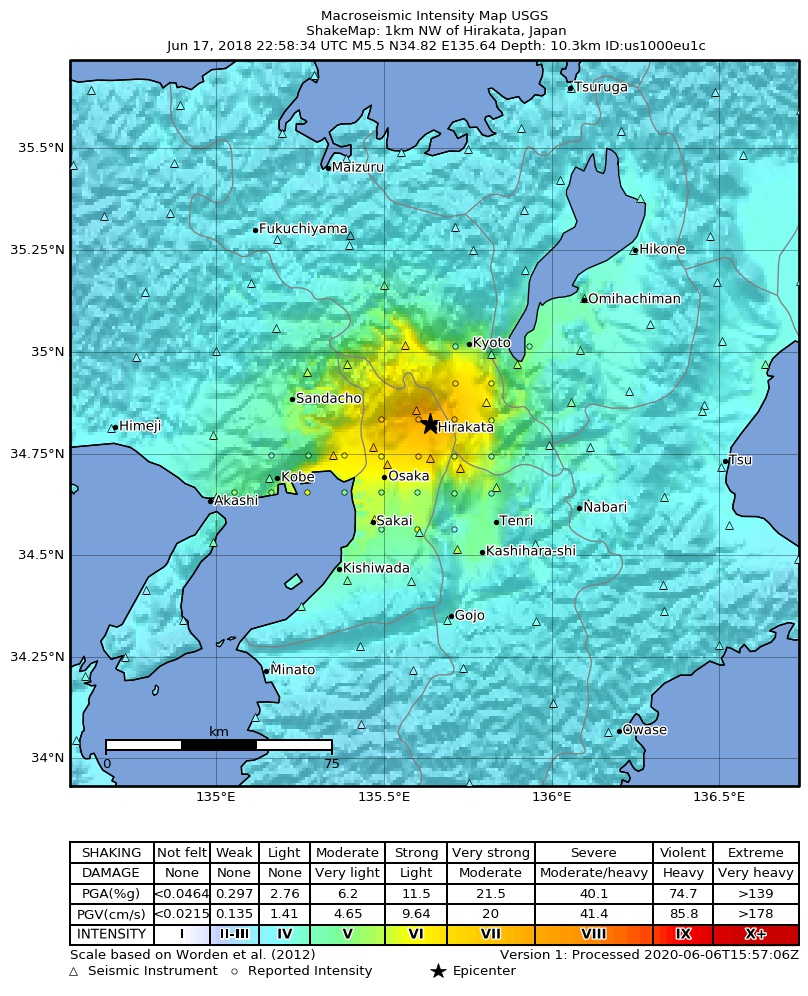

- Location within Osaka Prefecture
- UTC time: 2018-06-17 22:58:35
- ISC event: 612142414
- USGS-ANSS: ComCat
- Local date: 18 June 2018
- Local time: 7:58:35 JST
- Duration: A few seconds
- Magnitude: 5.6 M_{w} 6.1 M_{JMA}
- Depth: 10.3 km (6 mi)
- Epicenter: 34.825°N 135.639°E
- Type: Complex faulting on strike-slip and reverse faults
- Areas affected: Osaka Prefecture, Kyoto Prefecture, Hyōgo Prefecture, Nara Prefecture
- Total damage: approx. $1.6 billion
- Max. intensity: MMI VIII (Severe) JMA 6−
- Peak acceleration: 0.92 g 900.4 Gal
- Tsunami: No
- Aftershocks: M_{w} 4.6
- Casualties: 4 dead, 434 injured

On 18 June 2018, around 7:58:35 a.m. Japan Standard Time, an earthquake measuring 5.6 M_{w} on the moment magnitude scale (preliminary 5.5 M_{w}) struck in northern Osaka Prefecture, Japan. The earthquake's epicenter was near Takatsuki and occurred at a depth of approximately 10.3 kilometres (6.4 mi). The Japan Meteorological Agency reported a magnitude of 6.1 M_{j} and an intensity of 6 lower on the shindo scale.

Shaking from the earthquake was felt strongly in the prefecture and the nearby metropolitan areas of Osaka and Kyoto, temporarily disrupting electrical and gas service to 170,000 homes and buildings. The earthquake struck during rush hour, disrupting train services for several hours, and also damaged water pipes and hundreds of homes. Four people were killed, 15 serious injuries were reported, and 419 people had minor injuries.

== Earthquake ==
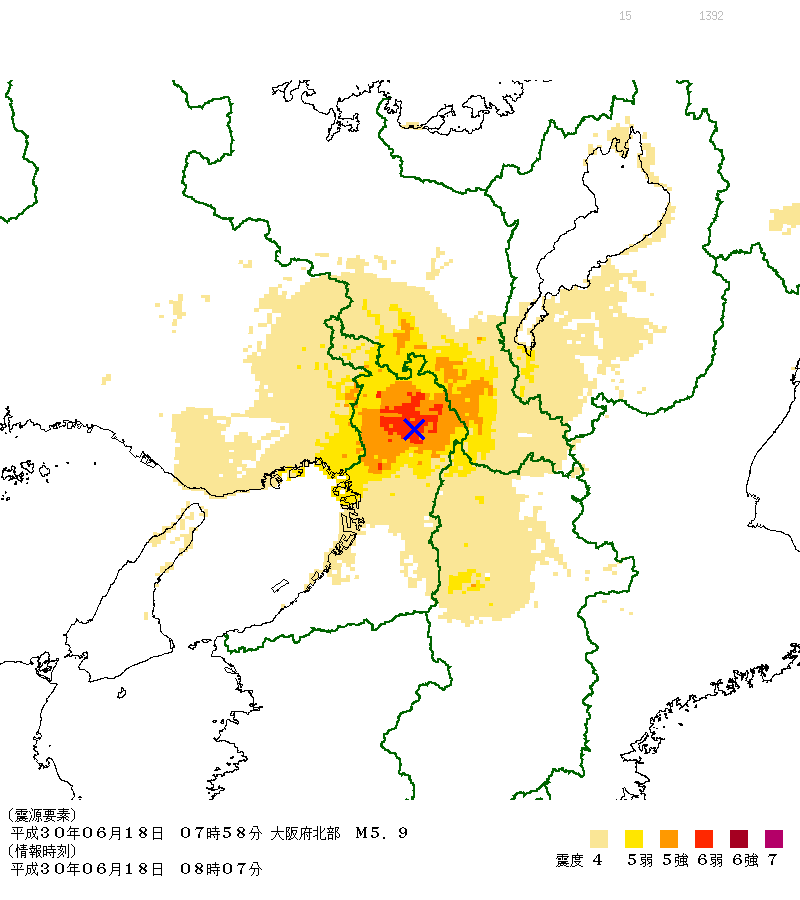
JMA seismic intensity map

The earthquake occurred at 7:58:35 a.m. Japan Standard Time on 18 June, with its epicenter in the Takatsuki area of northeastern Osaka, at a depth of approximately 13 kilometres (8.1 mi). The Kansai region sits atop several active faults, which can produce inland shallow earthquakes. Three of the region's fault zones (Arima-Takatsuki, Uemachi, and Ikoma) are located near the epicenter and are suspected to have caused the earthquake. The Great Hanshin earthquake of 1995 struck nearby Kobe with great intensity, causing thousands of deaths. It was felt strongly in northern Osaka and also affected parts of nearby Kyoto. Within the following week, a total of 40 strong aftershocks were detected by the Japan Meteorological Agency.

The earthquake triggered the national earthquake warning system, which set alarms approximately 3.2 seconds for the Osaka and Kyoto areas after the detection of seismic waves. No tsunami waves were generated as a result of the earthquake. The Japan Meteorological Agency assigned an initial magnitude of M_{JMA} 5.9, which it later upgraded to M_{JMA} 6.1 (moment magnitude of 5.6 M_{w}). The earthquake registered as 6 ("lower 6") on the shindo intensity scale, and the United States Geological Survey reported a magnitude of 5.5 M_{w}. It was the first time a lower 6 was registered in Osaka Prefecture since 1923 when the government started to keep seismic records.

The later research shows that the earthquake source was case of geometrically complex faulting on at least two different faults. The activated strike-slip fault was parallel to the Arima-Takatsuki fault zone (and Itami fault). Next, the activated reverse fault might have a relationship with the deeper segments of the Uemachi fault zone. Shear movements on both of these buried faults contribute significantly to the total seismic moment of this earthquake. Therefore, this event is case of joint movements on multiple faults.

JMA seismic intensity
Intensity	Prefecture	Location
6-	Osaka	Osaka (Kita-ku), Takatsuki, Hirakata, Ibaraki, Minoh
5+	Kyoto	Kyoto (Nakagyō-ku, Fushimi-ku, Nishikyō-ku), Kameoka, Nagaokakyō, Yawata, Ōyamazaki, Kumiyama
5+	Osaka	Osaka (Miyakojima-ku, Higashiyodogawa-ku, Asahi-ku, Yodogawa-ku) Toyonaka, Suita, Neyagawa, Settsu, Katano, Shimamoto
5-	Shiga	Ōtsu
5-	Kyoto	Uji, Jōyō, Mukō, Kyōtanabe, Nantan, Ide, Seika
5-	Osaka	Osaka (Fukushima-ku, Konohana-ku, Minato-ku, Nishiyodogawa-ku, Ikuno-ku), Ikeda, Moriguchi, Daitō, Shijōnawate, Toyono, Nose
5-	Hyōgo	Amagasaki, Nishinomiya, Itami, Kawanishi
5-	Nara	Yamatokōriyama, Gose, Takatori, Kōryō

== Damage and effects ==
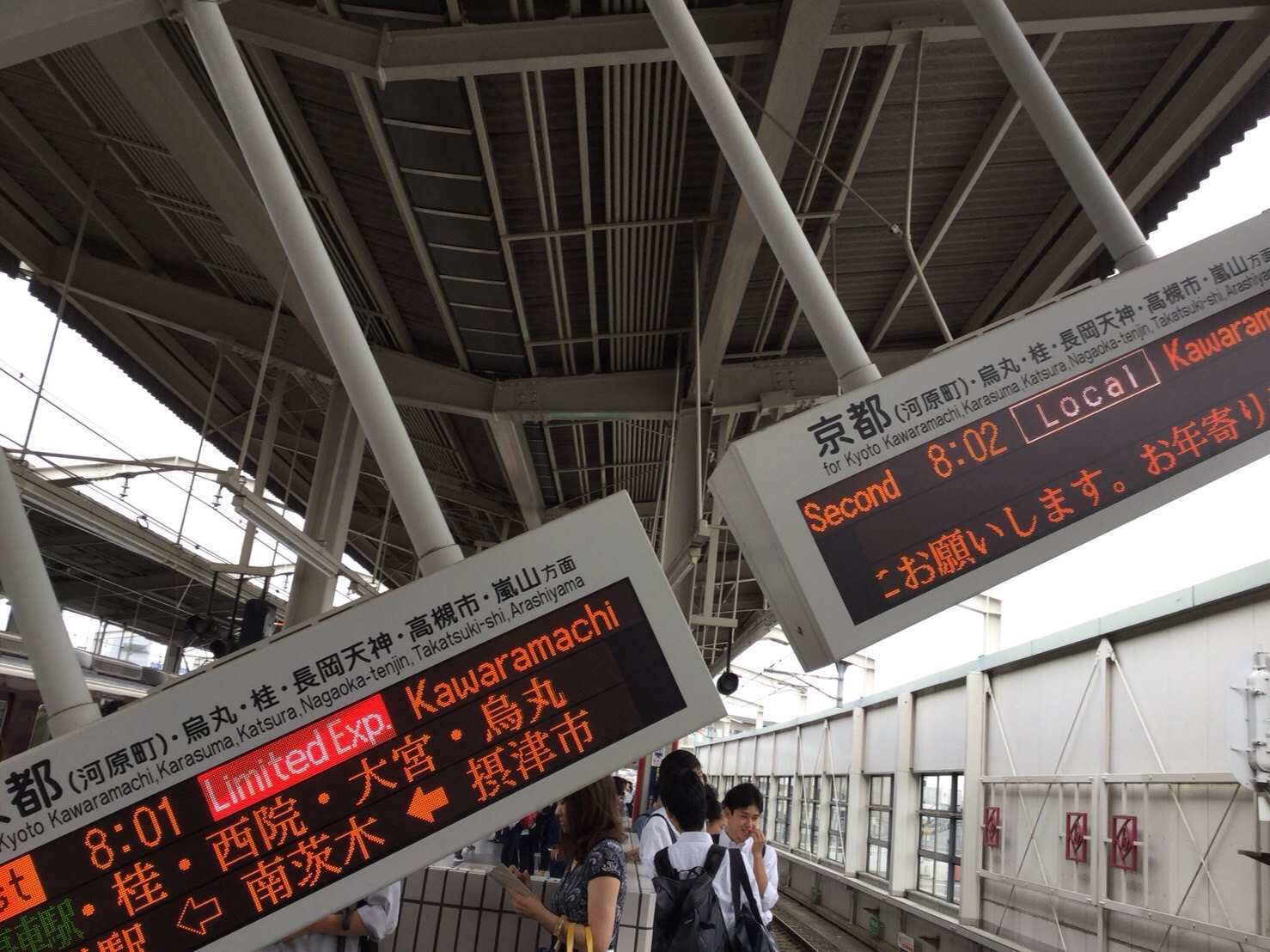
Hankyu Railway Station platform

The earthquake caused the partial collapse of several buildings, as well as damage to underground water pipes that left residents without running water. A total of 6,766 structures were found by government surveys to have sustained partial damage, primarily in Osaka Prefecture but also including several in Kyoto Prefecture, Nara Prefecture, and Hyōgo Prefecture. As many as 450 people remained in public shelters a week after the earthquake.

Roof tiles and stone ornaments at homes and historic temples and shrines fell to the ground. At least 170,000 homes in Osaka were initially under an electrical blackout, but power was restored later in the morning. Gas services were also stopped for over 112,000 households in Ibaraki and Takatsuki for several days, but was fully restored by 25 June.

The earthquake disrupted train services, including the Shinkansen, during the morning rush hour but had resumed service six hours later, in time for the afternoon commute. During the shutdown, passengers disembarked from trains and walked along the tracks, due to fears of aftershocks causing further damage. The Osaka Monorail reopened for service on 23 June, but was forced to suspend operations the following day due to the discovery of additional damage to the train cars.

Operations at the JXTG Nippon Oil & Energy's oil refinery in Osaka and various manufacturing plants in the Kansai region were suspended to check for damage. Flights at two of the airports in the Kansai region were temporarily suspended, but resumed hours later.

== Casualties ==
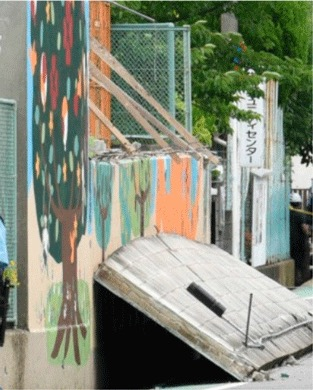
The block wall of the pool at Takatsuki City Jyuei elementary school that collapsed due to the earthquake. This block wall killed an elementary school student.

There were four confirmed deaths resulting from the earthquake, including a child in Takatsuki who was crushed by a collapsing wall outside her elementary school. The wall did not meet modern safety codes and prompted Chief Cabinet Secretary Yoshihide Suga to order safety checks of similar concrete block structures at schools across the country. 417 people were also injured and treated at hospitals.

== Response ==
Shortly after the earthquake, Prime Minister Shinzo Abe announced a pledge by the government to assist in rescue and recovery efforts. The Japanese Self Defense Force dispatched several teams to deliver water to residents, at the request of the prefectural government. Fears of landslides triggered by rains and further aftershocks led to hundreds of residents moving into public shelters.

After the earthquake, online rumors of ethnic non-Japanese residents committing dangerous crimes, such as looting and robbery, emerged on Twitter and other social media websites. The prefecture government and national Human Rights Bureau warned of false information being shared during the disaster and the Asahi Shimbun published an editorial criticizing the spread of hateful comments, comparing to similar rumors shared after the 1923 Great Kantō earthquake that resulted in racial riots.

== See also ==
- List of earthquakes in 2018
- List of earthquakes in Japan
- Great Hanshin earthquake
