= 2018 Ionian Sea earthquake =

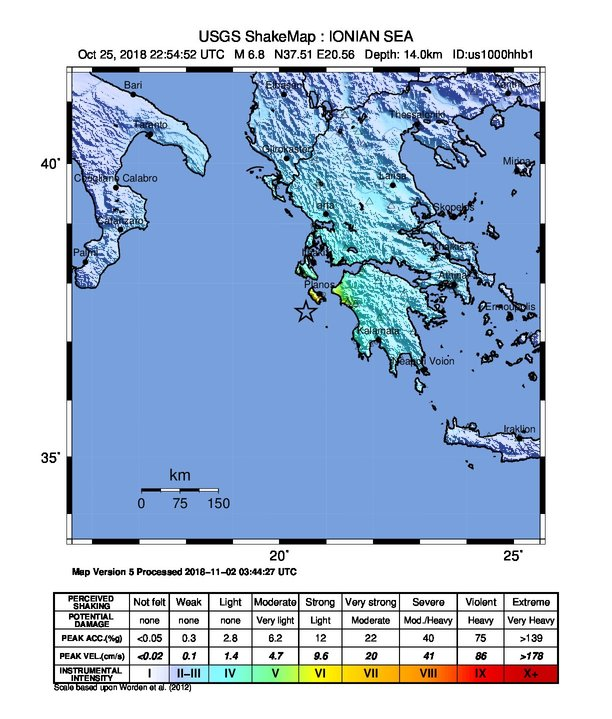

- Location within Greece
- UTC time: 2018-10-25 22:54:51
- ISC event: 613514189
- USGS-ANSS: ComCat
- Local date: October 26, 2018
- Local time: 01:54:51 EEST
- Magnitude: 6.8 M_{w}
- Depth: 14 km (8.7 mi)
- Epicenter: 37.506°N 20.563°E
- Max. intensity: MMI VII (Very strong)
- Tsunami: ~20 cm
- Aftershocks: 172 M 4.0+ (As of November 15, 2018)
- Casualties: 3 injured

A strong earthquake measuring magnitude M_{w} 6.8 occurred southwest of the island of Zakynthos in the Ionian Sea, near the coasts of Greece, during the night between 25 and 26 October 2018 at 22:54:51 UTC (01:54:51 in Greece). Sea level changes were predicted, and a tsunami advisory was issued. Reports of sea level change of up to 20 centimeters were reported in Greece and Italy.

== Tectonic setting ==
The island of Zakynthos lies close to the convergent boundary between the African and Eurasian plate. It is part of the Ionian Islands–Akarnania Block (IAB), which locally forms the "backstop" to the Mediterranean Ridge accretionary complex above the Hellenic subduction zone. To the northwest, the boundary between the IAB and the Apulian–Ionian microplate is formed by the Cephalonia-Lefkada Transform Fault. Both the underlying subduction megathrust and the neighbouring transform fault have been associated with historical seismicity, such as the 1953 Ionian earthquake and the 2015 Lefkada earthquake.

== Earthquake ==
The epicenter was located about 133 km from Patras. The earthquake occurred 14 km below the surface. The event was felt in eight countries, including in the Balkans, Italy, Malta as well as coasts of Africa and Turkey.

The focal mechanisms published by various groups for this earthquake are a mixture of thrust sense, strike-slip sense or a combination of the two. They also mostly show a large non double-couple component, which could be explained by slip on multiple fault segments, as most tectonic earthquakes have a low non double-couple component. The larger aftershocks show thrust sense movement, while there are several SSW–NNE trending "streaks" of aftershocks that are strike-slip in type. Definition of the rupture geometry using linear slip inversion is consistent with a smaller low-angle thrust fault sub-event, probably along the plate interface, followed by a larger steeper strike-slip sub-event within the upper plate.

The main shock was followed by multiple aftershocks in the following days, including undersea aftershocks of magnitude 4.4 and 5 over a week after the initial earthquake. The largest reported aftershock was of magnitude 5.6 the day of the initial earthquake.

== Damage ==
Other structures were damaged, but despite the magnitude of the event, there were no reported serious injuries or casualties. About 120 homes were left uninhabitable, and the town laterally shifted 5 centimeters as a result of the earthquake. A strict building code was cited as a possible reason for the limited amount of damage, as Zakynthos suffered major damage from the 1953 earthquake.

Power outages were reported on the island of Zakynthos, and a 15th-century monastery was also damaged on the islands of Strofades. The port of Zakynthos also sustained major damage, and a state of emergency was declared in the municipality. Services around Zakynthos were affected, and schools were closed on October 26. Tax relief was also extended into January in order to support the local tourism industry.
