= 2018 Peru earthquake =

7.1 magnitude earthquake in Peru on 14 January 2018

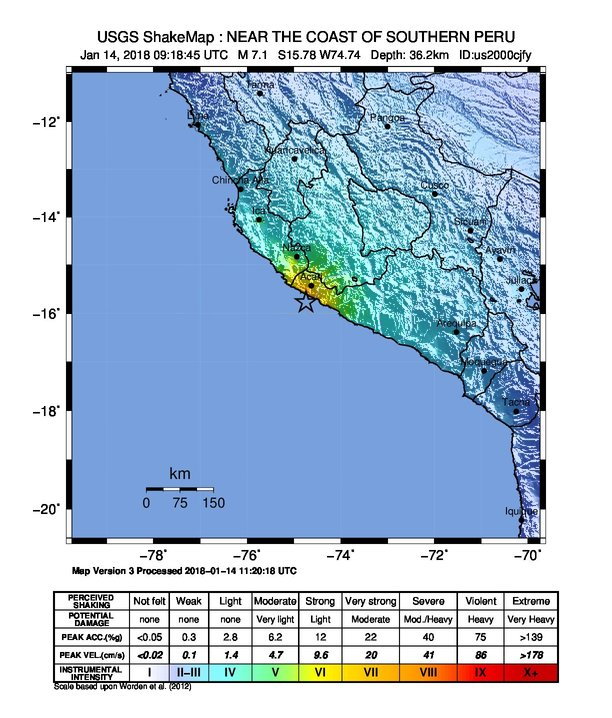
- USGS shakemap for the event

- Location within Peru
- UTC time: 2018-01-14 09:18:45
- ISC event: 611648221
- USGS-ANSS: ComCat
- Local date: 14 January 2018
- Local time: 04:18
- Magnitude: 7.1 M_{ww}
- Depth: 39.0 km
- Epicenter: 15.776°S 74.744°W
- Type: Thrust fault
- Areas affected: Peru
- Max. intensity: MMI VII (Very strong)
- Tsunami: 15 cm (5.9 in)
- Casualties: 2 dead, 139 injured

An earthquake struck Peru at 04:18:45 PET (09:18:45 UTC) on 14 January 2018. It had a magnitude of M_{ww} 7.1 with a maximum perceived intensity of VII (very strong) on the Mercalli intensity scale. One death was officially reported, though early reports initially claimed two, with a further 139 people injured. Widespread damage to adobe houses was reported with 443 homes being destroyed. An initial tsunami warning was later rescinded.

== Background ==
Earthquakes are common in Peru, especially in the Arequipa coastal area of Peru. This particular earthquake was a result of thrust faulting on the destructive boundary between the Nazca plate and the South American plate. As evidenced by the 2007 earthquake, many homes are not built to any type of standard making them prone to significant damage. Earthquakes can threaten industry as well as the population. Many of the copper mines are vulnerable to quakes, but there were no reports of damage to them.

== Earthquake ==
On Sunday, 14 January at 04:18 local time, a magnitude 7.1 earthquake struck Peru. The earthquake was positioned in the Pacific Ocean near the coast at a depth of around 39 km (24 mi), about 38 km (24 mi) south-southwest of Acari. There was no danger of a tsunami to the coastal area. Residents of Lomas, a town on the cost, were evacuated after feeling an aftershock.

The earthquake left two dead, and over a hundred and twenty injured. The earthquake caused some homes and roads in remote areas to collapse. Damage to roads delayed the arrival of help to the affected rural zones. Several boroughs were without electricity.

A tsunami was observed with heights of 15 cm in San Juan.

== Aftermath ==
According to the Earthquake Impact Database
Deaths	Injured	Displaced	Houses/Buildings Damaged	Houses/Buildings Destroyed
2	139	2000	1720	443

A 55-year-old man was fatally crushed by a rock in the city of Yauca located in the region of Arequipa. No information was released on the second victim except that they were in the same region as the first victim.

== See also ==
- 2007 Peru earthquake
