= North Hispaniola Fault =

The North Hispaniola Fault, North Hispaniola Thrust or North Hispaniola Deformed Belt is an active major thrust zone developed to the north of the island of Hispaniola. It has formed as a result of transpression along the southern margin of the North American Plate. The strike-slip part of the overall movement is taken up by the Septentrional-Oriente fault zone, while the North Hispaniola Fault takes up the shortening perpendicular to the boundary. GPS data suggest that the North Hispaniola Fault is associated with about 5 mm per year of convergence.
