= 2018 West Java earthquake =

Earthquake in Indonesia

- Location within Java
- UTC time: 2018-01-23 06:34:54
- ISC event: 616640769
- USGS-ANSS: ComCat
- Local date: 23 January 2018
- Local time: 13:34:50
- Magnitude: 5.9 M_{w}
- Depth: 43.9 km (27.3 mi)
- Epicenter: 7.092°S 105.963°E
- Fault: Indo-Australian Plate
- Type: Strike-slip
- Areas affected: Lampung, Banten, West Java, Central Java, Jakarta.
- Max. intensity: MMI V (Moderate)
- Tsunami: No
- Landslides: Unknown
- Aftershocks: 50 confirmed
- Casualties: 2 dead 41 injured

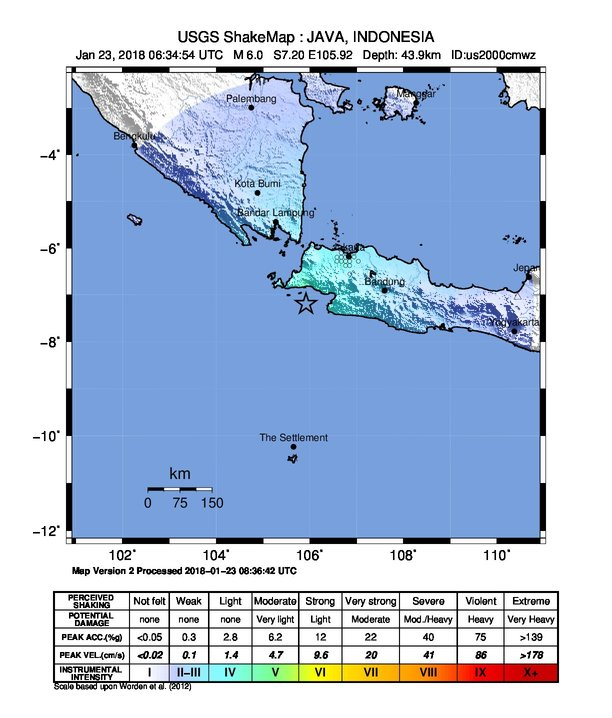
2018 Banten Earthquake shakemap

On 23 January 2018, at 13:34:50 Western Indonesian Time (06:34:54 UTC), an earthquake struck the Indonesian island of Java near the regency of Lebak. The earthquake, measured 5.9 on the M_{ww}, occurred approximately 40 kilometres south of the village of Binuangeun at a depth of 43.9 kilometres. The earthquake was categorized as a strong and shallow earthquake.

Strong shaking were widely reported across Banten, Lampung, West Java, Central Java and Jakarta. The tremor in Jakarta was much harder than in other recent quakes. By the virtue of its distance from the Indo-Australian plate, the capital normally does not experience strong tremors. Two people were indirectly killed by the earthquake.

== Damage and casualties ==
Property damage was reported in West Java and Banten. In the Lebak and Sukabumi regencies, 2,760 and 3,669 buildings were damaged respectively. Two people died from heart attacks in Lebak and Sukabumi and 35 others were injured. The Depok city hall was damaged by the earthquake as well.
