= Labuhan Lombok =

Labuhan Lombok Tanjung Kayangan
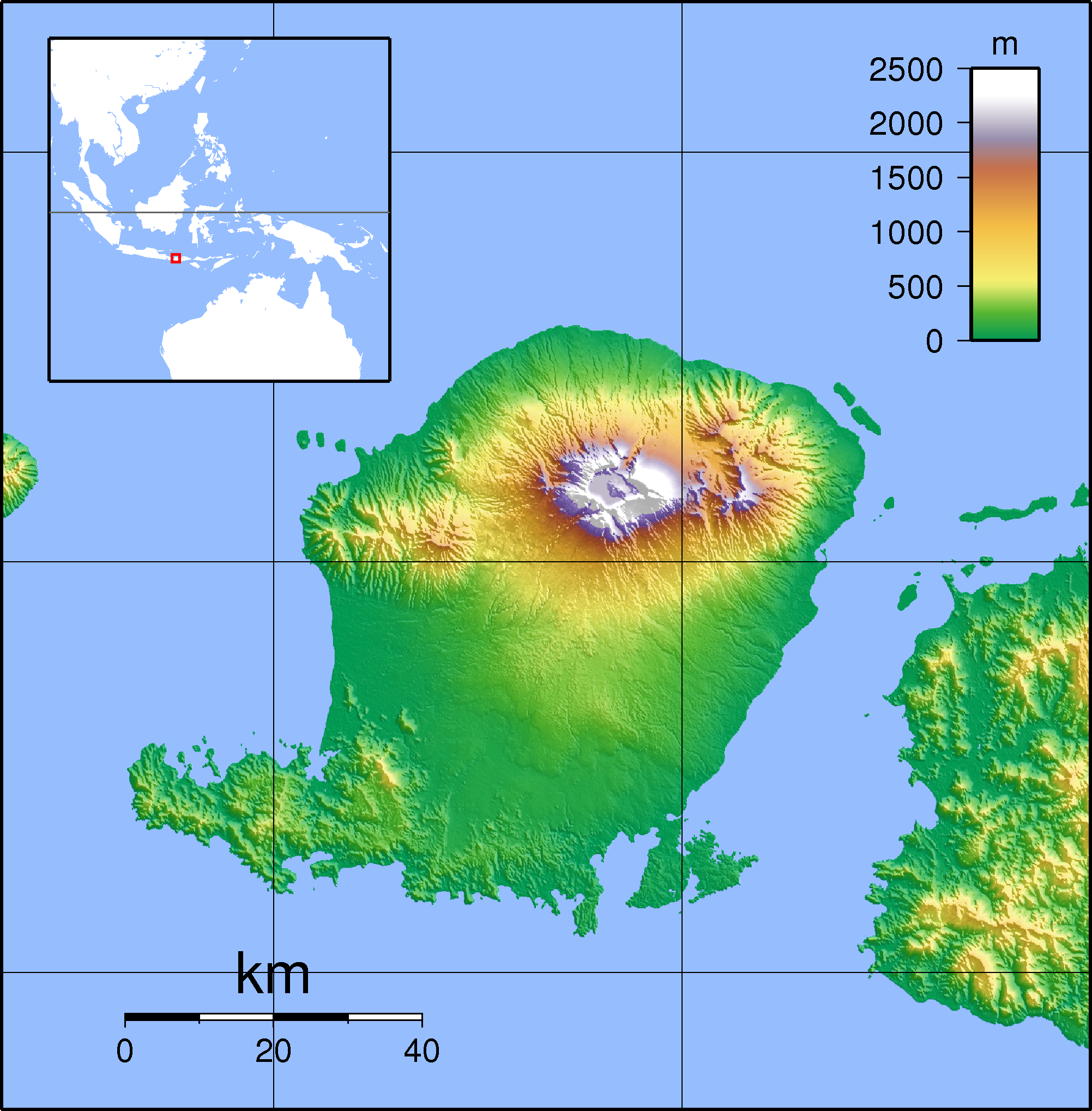
- Location in Indonesia Labuhan Lombok (Indonesia)
- Coordinates: 8°30′22″S 116°39′27″E
- Country: Indonesia
- Region: Lesser Sunda Islands
- Province: West Nusa Tenggara
- Regency: East Lombok

Labuhan Lombok is a port town in eastern Lombok, Indonesia, 74 kilometres east of the city of Mataram.

True to the name, which means "Port of Lombok", it is best known as the port for ferries to the neighboring island of Sumbawa. The town is also called Tanjung Kayangan. The port is located to the south of the town and connects with Poto Tano in Sumbawa.
