= 2018 Gulf of Alaska earthquake =

Earthquake in Gulf of Alaska

2018 Alaska earthquake
- Location within Alaska
- UTC time: 2018-01-23 09:31:40
- ISC event: 611653794
- USGS-ANSS: ComCat
- Local date: January 23, 2018
- Local time: 00:31:42 Alaska Standard Time
- Magnitude: 7.9 M_{ww}
- Depth: 25 km (16 mi)
- Epicenter: 56.046°N 149.073°W
- Type: Strike-slip
- Areas affected: United States; Canada
- Max. intensity: MMI V (Moderate)
- Tsunami: 25 cm (9.8 in) in Crescent City, California
- Aftershocks: 564 (As of March 1, 2018)
- Casualties: None

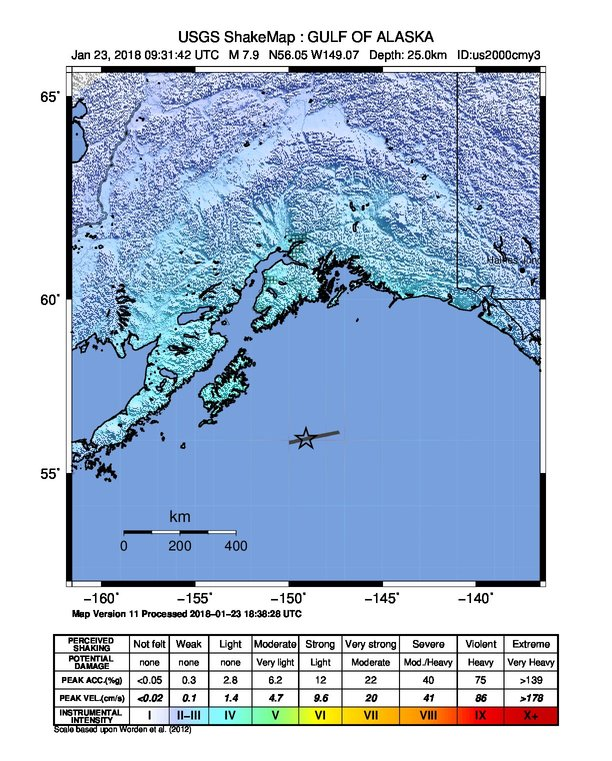
Shakemap of the 2018 Alaska earthquake

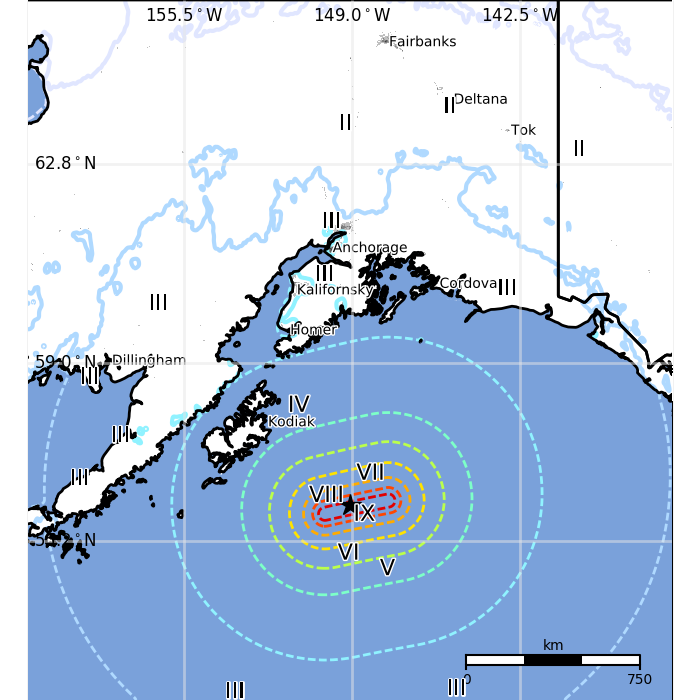
Isoseismal map of the Alaska Earthquake in 2018 provided by the US Geological Survey

On January 23, 2018, at 00:31 AKST, an earthquake occurred in the Gulf of Alaska near Kodiak Island. The earthquake, measured at 7.9 on the M_{w} scale, was approximately 280 kilometers (170 mi) southeast of Kodiak and happened at a depth of 25 kilometers (16 mi).

It was initially measured as a M 8.2 event, but later downgraded by the United States Geological Survey. The earthquake was felt throughout most of southern Alaska, including the major cities of Anchorage and Fairbanks, and parts of neighboring British Columbia.

The earthquake prompted tsunami warnings and advisories for Alaska, British Columbia, Washington, Oregon, California, and Hawaii. Residents in low-lying areas along the Gulf of Alaska and in British Columbia were evacuated to shelters and higher ground. The National Tsunami Warning Center later cancelled most of the alerts within four hours of the earthquake, due to the apparent lack of tsunami. The highest recorded wave amplitude measured 25 centimetres (9.8 in) in Crescent City, California.

== Earthquake ==
According to the United States Geological Survey, the earthquake occurred 175 miles (282 km) southeast of Kodiak, Alaska at 12:31 a.m. local time (AKST). Witnesses to the earthquake itself reported that it was very long in duration, feeling like a "slow roller," but it was not a violent earthquake despite its magnitude and mercalli intensity, as its epicentre was hundreds of kilometres offshore. This was corroborated by witnesses in Anchorage. There was no immediate damage reported. The earthquake woke people in Anchorage, 350 miles (560 km) from the epicenter, and was felt as far as Fairbanks to the northeast and British Columbia to the southeast. The earthquake's S waves arrived in Anchorage within one minute, and reached Fairbanks within three minutes.

The earthquake was a strike-slip event that occurred within the Pacific plate. The epicenter was to the south of the Aleutian Trench, where the Pacific plate subducts beneath the North American plate. The region has produced twelve large earthquakes since 1900, including several megathrust earthquakes.

=== Aftershocks ===
The first major aftershocks occurred 20 minutes after the earthquake. The strongest aftershock measured 5.5 on the moment magnitude scale, while most measured 4–5. Within two days, the United States Geological Survey recorded over 50 aftershocks.

== Alerts and evacuations ==
Communities on Kodiak Island and other coastal areas on the Gulf of Alaska and Cook Inlet were evacuated after warning sirens were activated. Hundreds gathered in local schools, which were opened as evacuation shelters, in Kodiak, Seward, and Homer. Evacuees seeking higher ground filled local roads and the parking lots of supermarkets, while locals reported large numbers of evacuees parking near a wind farm on Pillar Mountain near Kodiak. An unrelated power outage at the Alaska Earthquake Center in Fairbanks caused some alerts to be delayed, while its website was overwhelmed by the number of users. The National Weather Service sent emergency alerts to cell phones in Alaska, reading, "Emergency Alert. Tsunami danger on the coast. Go to high ground or move inland."

The Pacific Tsunami Warning Center and National Tsunami Warning Center initially issued a tsunami watch for Hawaii and the entire West Coast, but cancelled them after less than two hours. In the San Francisco Bay Area, residents within three blocks of the Pacific coast and five blocks of the San Francisco Bay were warned by the city's Department of Emergency Management to be ready for evacuation.

Some aspects of the warning systems in place were delayed or failed to issue a warning at all, prompting multiple reviews of the warning infrastructure.

== See also ==
- 2018 Anchorage earthquake
