= 2018 Anchorage earthquake =

Magnitude 7.1 earthquake in Alaska, US

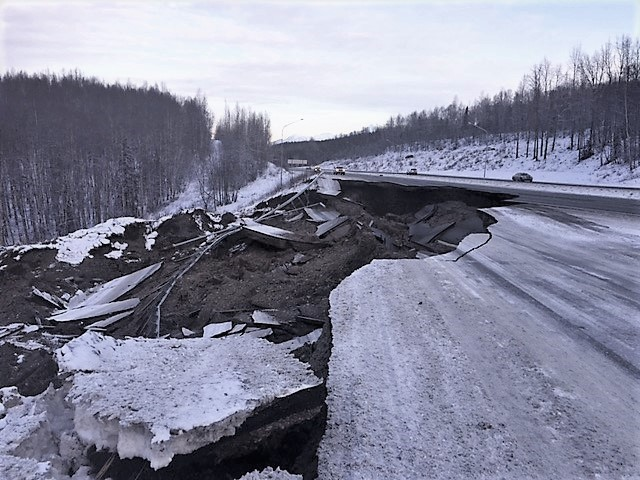
- Damage to the Glenn Highway

- Location within Alaska
- UTC time: 2018-11-30 17:29:29
- ISC event: 616643636
- USGS-ANSS: ComCat
- Local date: November 30, 2018
- Local time: 08:29:28 AKST
- Magnitude: 7.1 M_{ww}
- Depth: 46.7 km (29.0 mi)
- Epicenter: 61.346°N 149.955°W
- Type: Dip-slip (normal)
- Areas affected: Alaska
- Max. intensity: MMI VIII (Severe)
- Peak acceleration: 0.474 g
- Aftershocks: 2,455 (As of January 1, 2020)
- Casualties: 117 injured

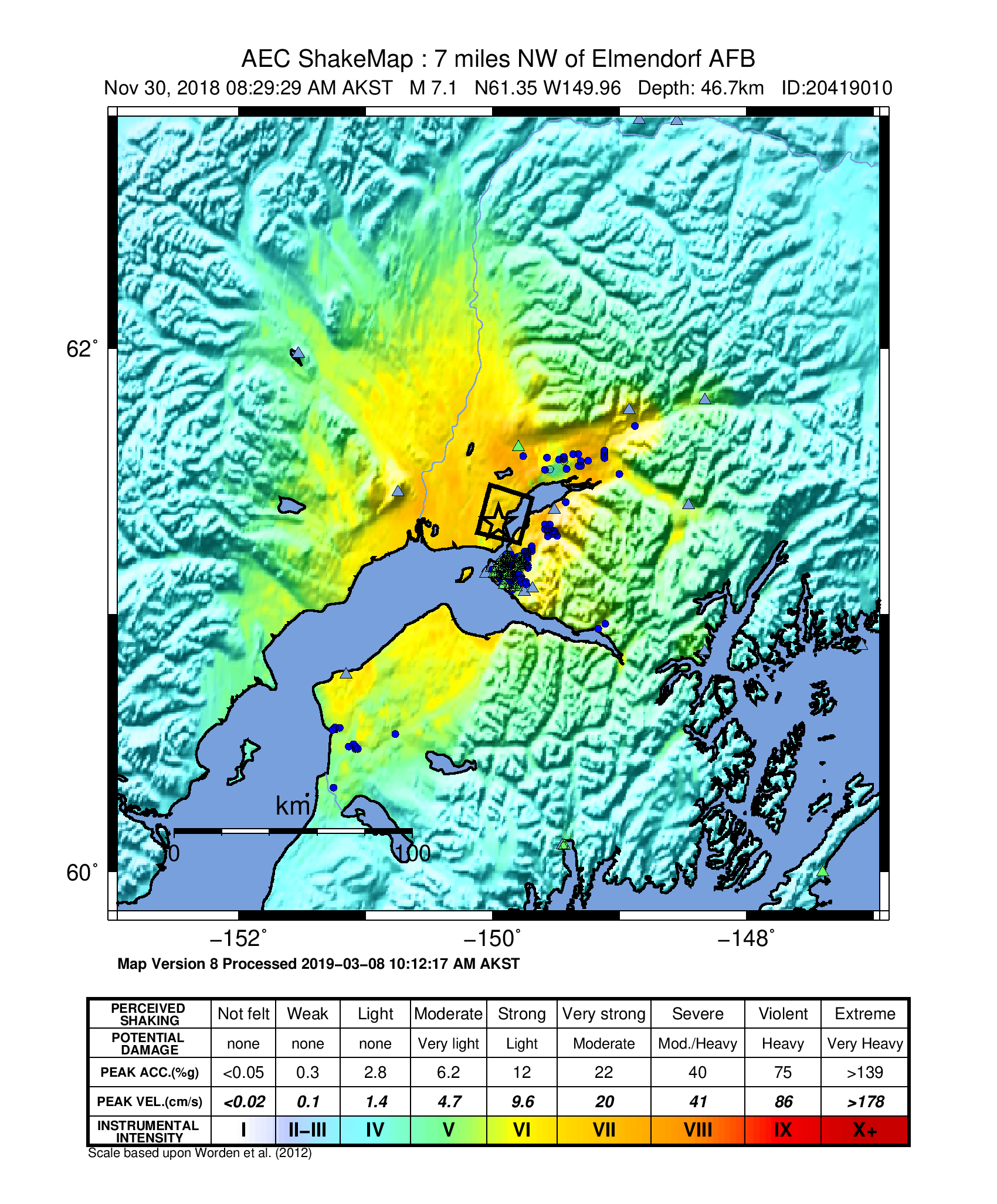
USGS Shakemap for the event

On November 30, 2018, at 8:29 a.m. AKST (17:29 UTC), a magnitude 7.1 earthquake hit Anchorage in Southcentral Alaska. The earthquake's epicenter was near Point Mackenzie, about 10 miles (16 km) north of Anchorage, and occurred at a depth of 29 miles (47 km). It was followed six minutes later by a magnitude 5.7 aftershock centered 2.5 miles (4.0 km) north-northwest of the municipality. The earthquake could be felt as far away as Fairbanks.

The National Tsunami Warning Center—itself located inside the quake zone, in Palmer, Alaska, 42 miles (68 km) northeast of Anchorage—issued tsunami warnings for nearby coastal areas, including Cook Inlet and the Kenai Peninsula, but they were lifted shortly after.

== Tectonic setting ==
Southern Alaska lies at the eastern end of the Aleutian Trench, where the Pacific plate is subducting beneath the North American plate. Near Anchorage, the plates are converging at a rate of 57 mm per year. The region has experienced severe earthquakes in the past, including several megathrust earthquakes. The 1964 earthquake, with a magnitude of 9.2, was the largest earthquake in American history and the second largest to ever be recorded anywhere in the world. Though earthquakes are common in Alaska, they often occur out at sea. This earthquake is more similar to the 2001 Nisqually earthquake located near Tacoma, Washington, than to the 1964 megathrust earthquake.

== Earthquake ==
The earthquake had a magnitude of 7.1 on the moment magnitude scale using a centroid moment tensor inversion of the W-phase. The focal mechanism shows that the earthquake was a result of normal faulting. A fault dipping at 29° towards the east gives the best match to the observed seismic waveforms. The depth and mechanism are consistent with faulting within the down-going Pacific plate. This implies that the earthquake was an intraslab earthquake within that plate, rather than at the plate boundary between the Pacific and North American plates beneath the Anchorage area. This is a different mechanism than megathrust faults in the region, which do occur on the plate boundary itself. This faulting in the Pacific plate is caused by downward bending while the plate is being forced under Alaska.

== Aftershocks ==
Magnitude of 2018 Anchorage earthquake and aftershocks.

Map of 2018 Anchorage earthquake and aftershocks.

Over 80 aftershocks of various magnitudes were recorded throughout the day, with at least three having magnitudes greater than 5.0. By December 3, 170 aftershocks with a magnitude over 3.0 had been noted. Two more aftershocks hit on February 6, the first with a magnitude of 4.1, and the second coming 23 minutes later with a magnitude of 3.7. Aftershocks were expected to continue for around 300 days after the mainshock.

== Damage ==
Severe damage to several buildings and a highway overpass near Ted Stevens Anchorage International Airport was reported. There were no fatalities, but at least 117 people were injured, mostly for minor injuries such as cuts, bruises or anxiety. Some suffered broken bones, and one resident suffered serious smoke inhalation while trying to put out a post-quake fire at his home. The Kenai Peninsula Borough School District reported that all students were safe.

Landings at three airports were temporarily affected by the earthquake: the Ted Stevens International Airport, Merrill Field Airport and Joint Base Elmendorf–Richardson. The Anchorage Police Department reported major infrastructure damage across the city. Liquefaction was reported. Several traffic lights were knocked down, bringing traffic to a halt. Many roads were also damaged. The Glenn Highway was damaged to the point where officials stated it would likely take a long time to repair. A ramp connecting Minnesota Drive to area streets collapsed, as well as the surrounding hillside. A driver in an SUV who was on the section of destroyed highway was stranded, but uninjured. The Alaska Railroad had to suspend all operations due to severe damage at their operations center and unknown condition of tracks. The operators of the Trans-Alaska Pipeline shut the system down as a precaution; however, they reported that there was no known damage to the pipeline and it later resumed service.

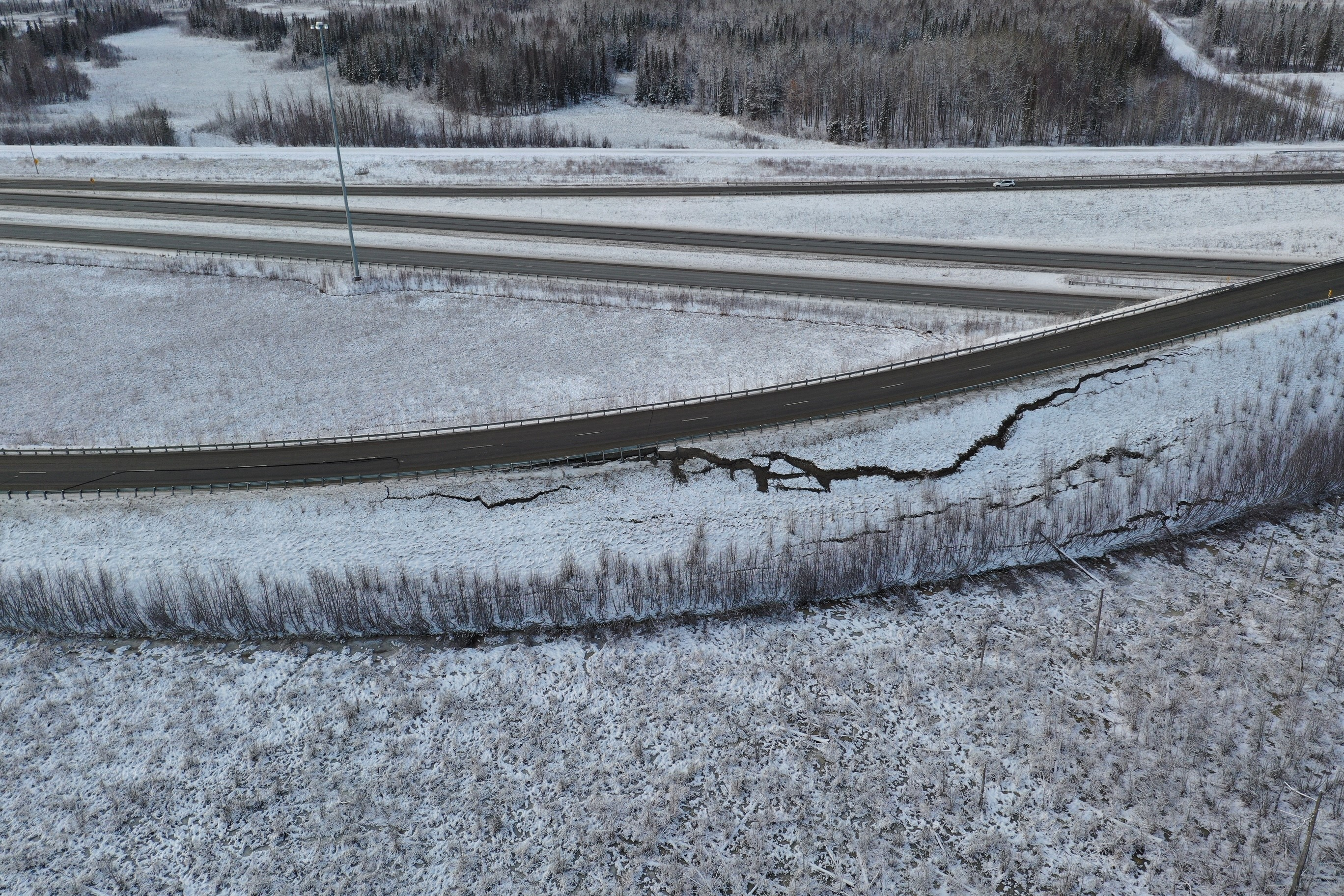
Damage near Palmer

The Alaska Airlines Center, a large sports complex on the University of Alaska Anchorage (UAA) campus, flooded due to broken fire sprinkler pipes. Several trophy cases were also damaged. UAA's older Wells Fargo Sports Complex suffered similar damage. Over 120 schools in the Anchorage and the Matanuska-Susitna Borough School Districts were damaged. Eagle River Elementary and Gruening Middle schools in Anchorage, and Houston Middle School in the Mat-Su were the only three to experience severe structural damage. Students in both districts were sent home and schools were closed to assess the damage. Within the three weeks of the earthquake, all schools with the exception of Eagle River Elementary and Gruening Middle schools in Anchorage and Houston Middle School, had re-opened. The remaining three had all experienced severe structural damage and were closed for the rest of the year. Houston Middle School students were sent to attend Houston High School and, in September 2020, the Houston Middle school building was ordered demolished due to a combination of earthquake damage and poor-quality construction. Sixteen students and twelve staff were injured in the quakes districts, including eleven students at MSBSD's Colony Middle School. Injuries were mostly minor. One student had a concussion due to falling books and one teacher went into labor.

The newsroom studio of KTVA in Anchorage (then affiliated with CBS) was heavily damaged, but the channel remained on the air. Several branches in the Anchorage Public Library system sustained damage. Many books were knocked off the shelves, which took days to clean up. Structural damage was noted in some locations. In the Anchorage community of Eagle River, at least one home collapsed during the earthquake. One man in the home, whose spouse was at work, was able to escape with several pets.

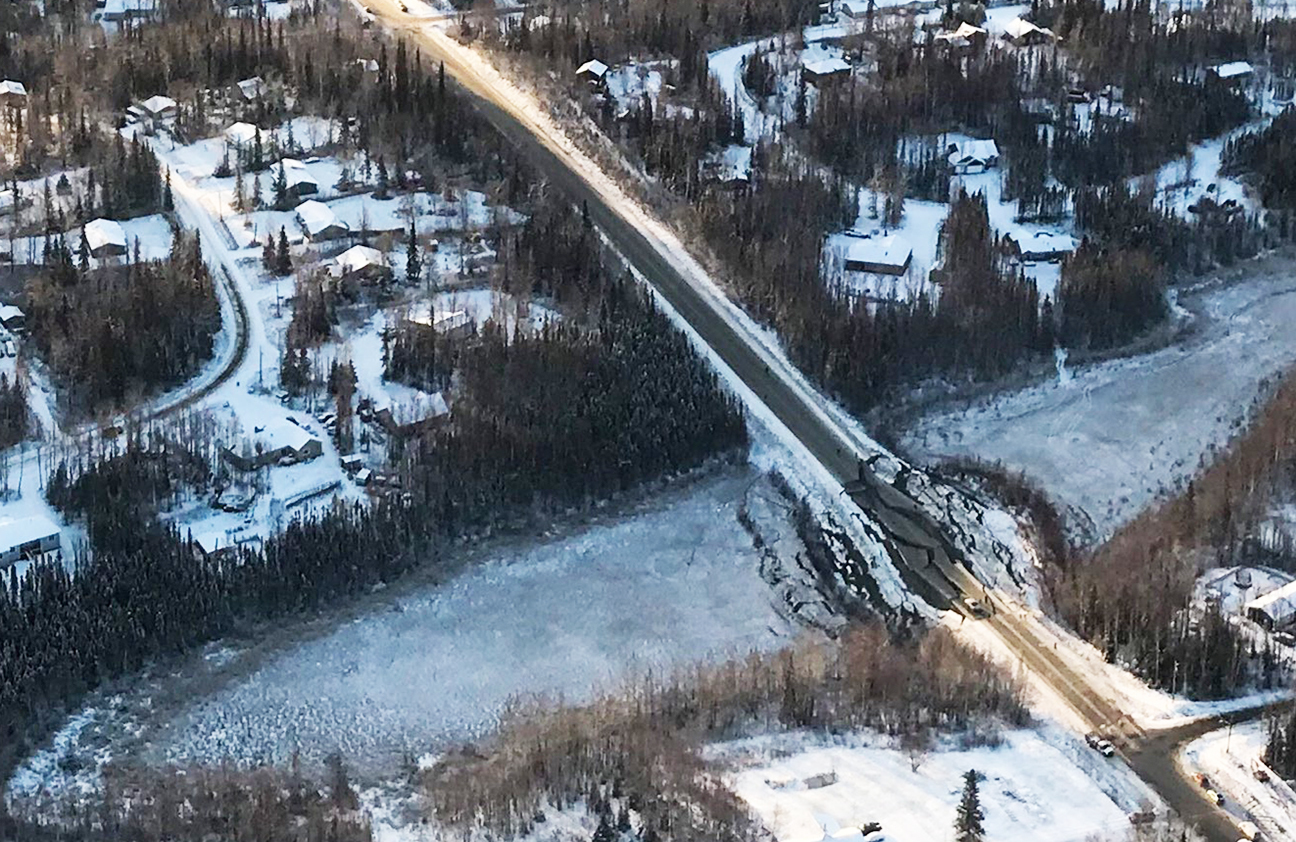
Damage to Vine Road in Wasilla

Significant damage was also done to roads in the Mat-Su. Among the most heavily damaged roads were the Palmer-Wasilla Highway, Pittman Road, Point MacKenzie Road and Vine Road. Suffering the worst damage was Vine Road, a section of which buckled and became impassable. In addition, Matanuska Electric Association reported that 46,000 customers were left without electricity immediately after the earthquake.

Overall, damage in Anchorage was estimated to be at least US$30 million, including $10 million to repair pipes, and $10 million in public facilities. Damage estimates to the Anchorage School District ranged from $25 to $50 million.

== Response ==
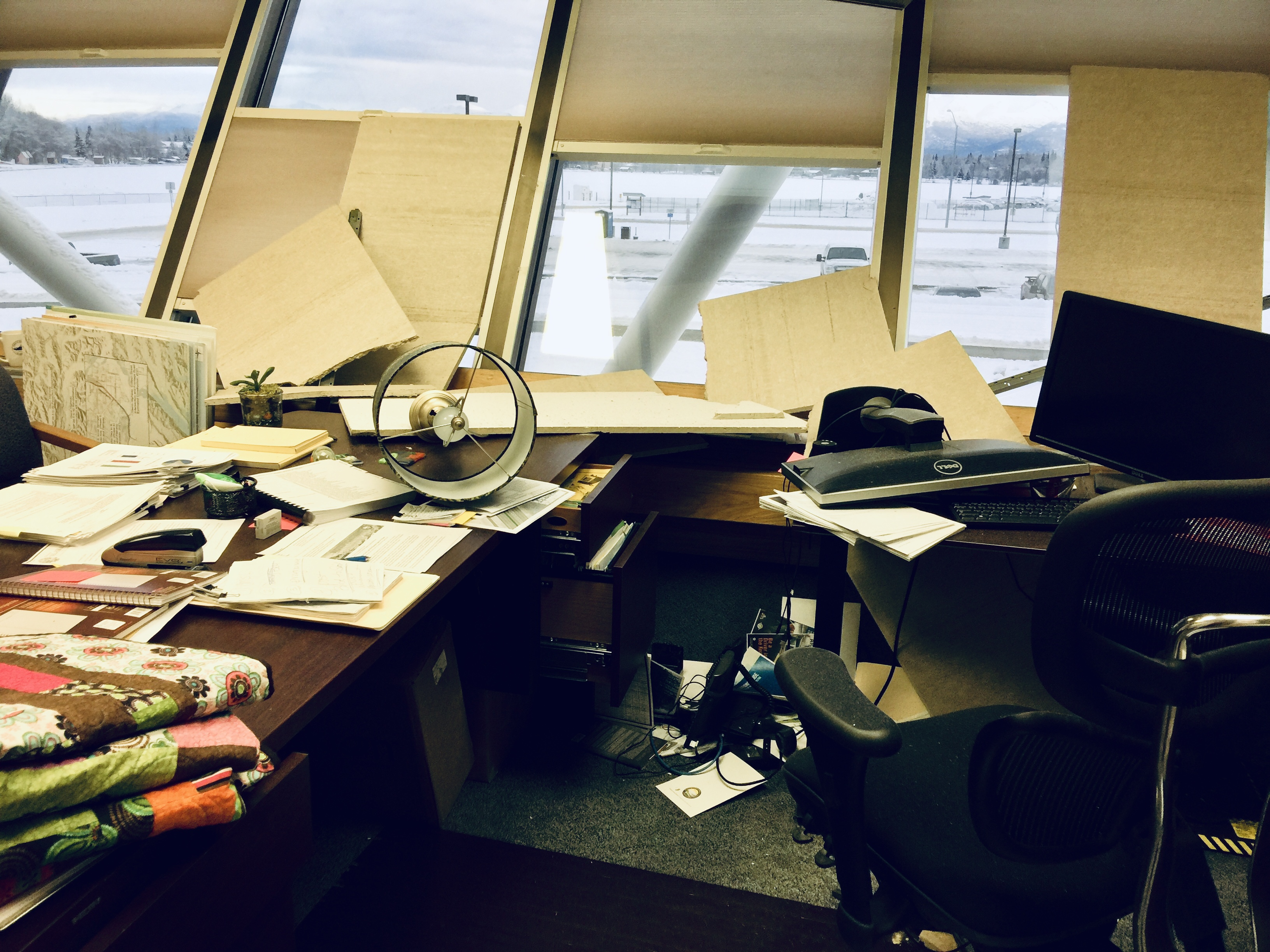
An office in Anchorage in disarray after the quake

A federal disaster was declared shortly after the earthquake and the Federal Emergency Management Agency (FEMA) deployed personnel from the state emergency operations center at Joint Base Elmendorf-Richardson to conduct relief operations.

Alaska Governor Bill Walker said "It's been a 7.2 earthquake, but our response was a 10."

Anchorage Mayor Ethan Berkowitz likewise declared a state of emergency for his city, and requested both state and federal assistance. The local public bus system, People Mover, ended service for the day following the earthquake. The city announced that regular bus service would resume the following day, and would be free of charge for the two days following the earthquake to help city residents get around on damaged roads.

The Alaska Department of Transportation and Public Facilities moved quickly to inspect bridges and begin road repairs. Although roads in Anchorage aren't normally paved during winter, area asphalt plants were restarted and within days sufficient repairs were made to reopen several heavily damaged roads.

== See also ==
- List of earthquakes in 2018
- List of earthquakes in Alaska
- List of earthquakes in the United States
- 2018 Gulf of Alaska earthquake
