= Von Damm Vent Field =

Hydrothermal area in the Caribbean Sea

Von Damm Vent Field (VDVF)
- A series of vents on the Mid-Cayman Spreading Center.
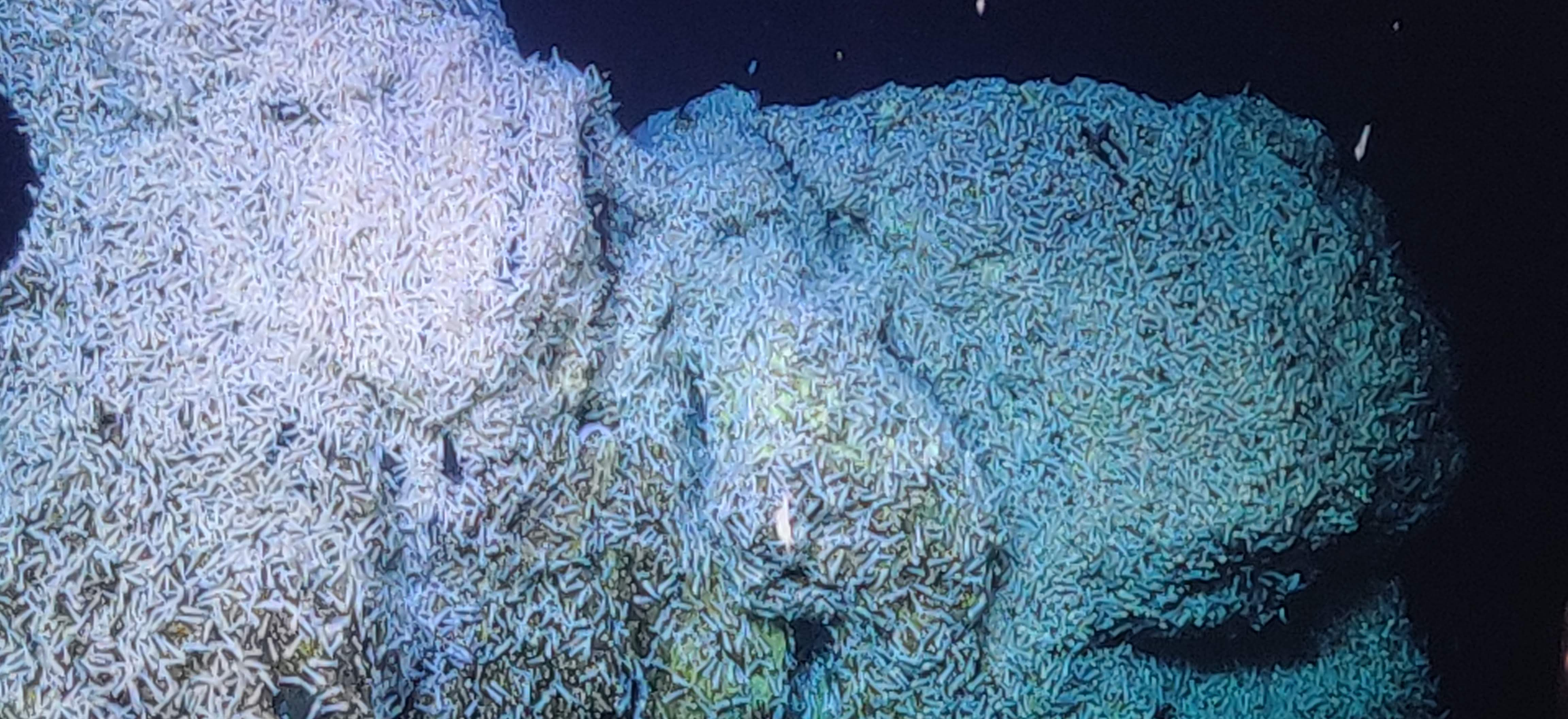
- The Von Damm summit covered in shrimp.

- Location within Earth
- Location: Mid-Cayman Rise
- Coordinates: 18°22′36″N 81°47′52″W
- Area: 5,000 square metres (54,000 sq ft)
- Max. elevation: −2,387 metres (−7,831 ft)
- Min. elevation: −2,290 metres (−7,510 ft)

The Von Damm Hydrothermal Field is a field of hydrothermal vents located just south of Grand Cayman in the Caribbean, on the Mid-Cayman Rise in the Cayman Trough. It is approximately 24 kilometres (15 mi) south of the Beebe Vent Field. The vent field is named in commemoration of geochemical oceanographer Karen Von Damm, who died in 2008.

Von Damm is situated a depth of approximately 2,300 metres (7,500 ft) below sea level, situating it within the Bathyal zone with the majority of other hydrothermal vent fields. The hydrothermal plume "Von Damm" was detected in 2010, with the site being visually confirmed later that year. Von Damm is of particular interest due to its location atop an ocean core complex associated with the Mid-Cayman spreading center. This exposes potential ultramafic rocks to seawater, hosting geochemical reactions unique to those of Beebe nearby and potentially similar to those of the Lost City Field.

By some, Von Damm is considered a new class of hydrothermal system (deviating from black smoker and alkaline systems) and may be a common occurrence.

== Geography ==
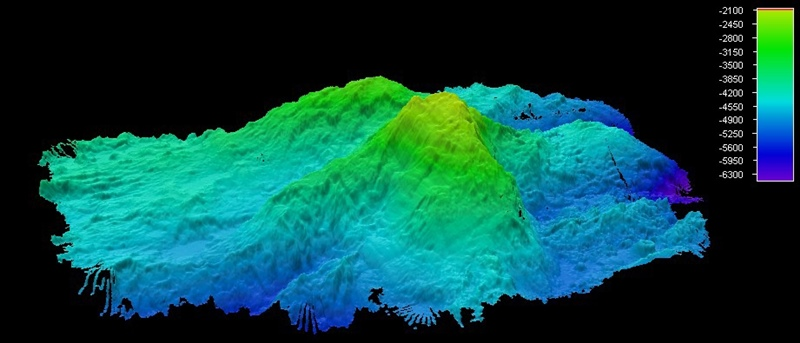
A bathymetry map of the Mount Dent ocean core complex.

The Von Damm vent field is located centrally on the Mid-Cayman Rise between the Oriente and Swan Island transform faults. The ocean core complex, which the field resides on the eastern side of, is known as Mount Dent and is the most central of the three known on the spreading center. The other two being Mount Emms and Mount Hudson. Mount Dent rises from a depth of approximately 5,000 metres (16,000 ft) to 2,000 metres (6,600 ft), an elevation change comparable to Mount McArthur (British Columbia) or Mount Tate. The field itself is approximately 13 kilometres (8.1 mi) west of the Mid-Cayman spreading center, where the crust is estimated to be 1-2 million years old.

The field is composed of two main regions, north and south, on overlapping talc mounds linked by locations of diffuse flow. Talc mounds continue to the southeast, with the largest inactive mound located approximately 700 metres (2,300 ft) east of the active vents.

Due to the proximity to the Cayman Islands, the Von Damm field falls under British jurisdiction.

=== Vents ===
Vents plumes at the Von Damm vent field don't contain significant amounts of metals, so venting fluids lack the colors used to identify vents (black and white smokers). Most venting locations are covered in the shrimp Rimicaris hybisae, however. This makes them easier to identify by looking for dense patches of shrimp and shimmering water.

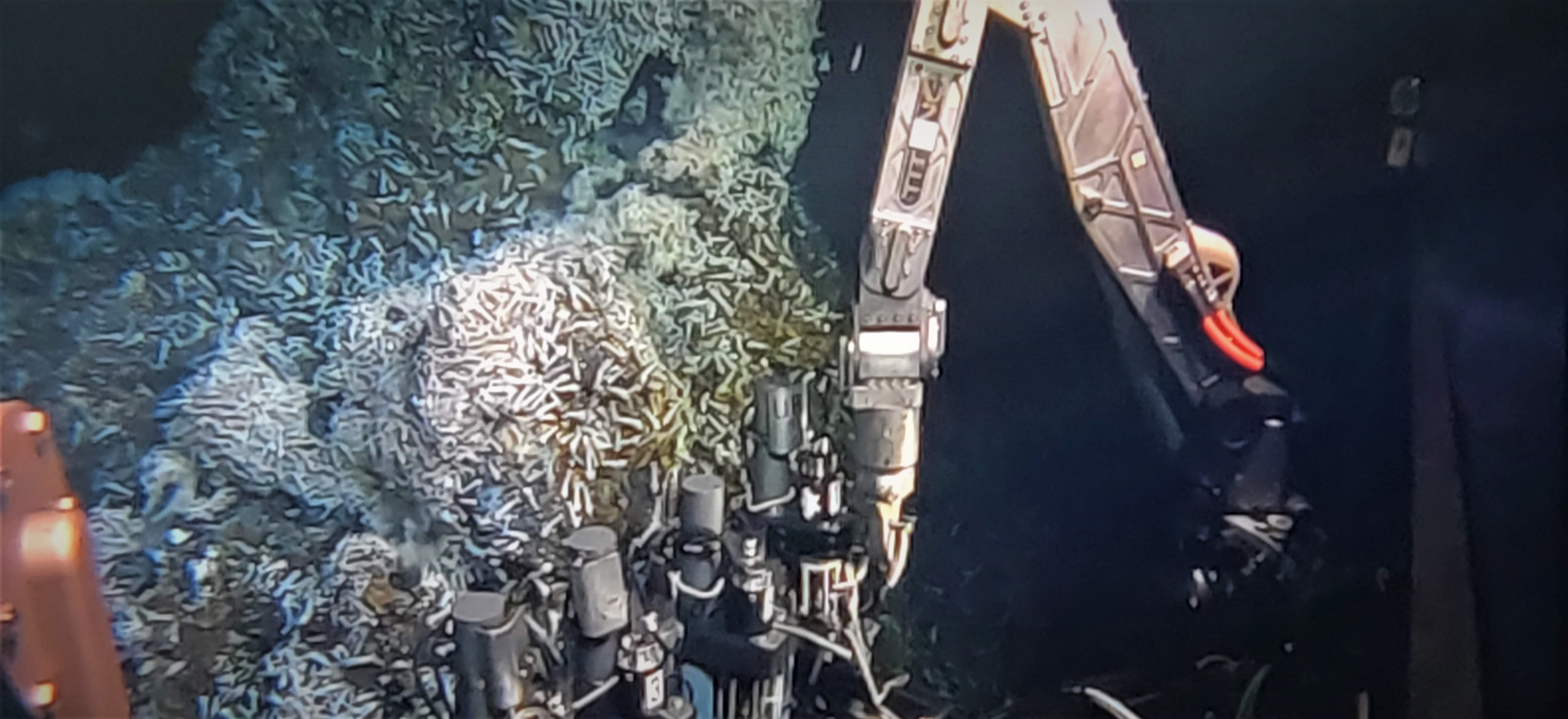
ROV Jason working on AT42-22.

==== Northern Summit ====
Vents at the northern end of the Von Damm Vent Field include the hottest observed in the entire vent field. The Spire has the hottest temperatures, between 215 °C (419 °F) and 226 °C (439 °F) and among the lowest observed pH values at around 5.5 to 6. These are less pronounced at nearby venting locations, such as White Castle, Ginger Castle, Arrow Loop, and Hotter than Hole.

==== Southern Mounds ====
Further southeast are vents associated with longer-lived venting and tend to be cooler in temperature. Vent locations such as Old Man Tree, Shrimp Hole, X-15 and X18 are all venting at temperatures below 120 °C (248 °F). Ravelin is perhaps the hottest at this side of the field, venting at up to 145 °C (293 °F).

== Geochemistry ==
The Von Damm vent field consists of talc mounds, which have exposed mafic or ultramafic rocks such as gabbros or peridotites containing the mineral olivine. Chimney structures at the Von Damm field are of varying shapes and sizes, but tend to also consist of talc precipitates. Upon discovery, this mineralogy was unique to Von Damm, as other vent fields displayed chimneys of calcium carbonate or metal sulfides.

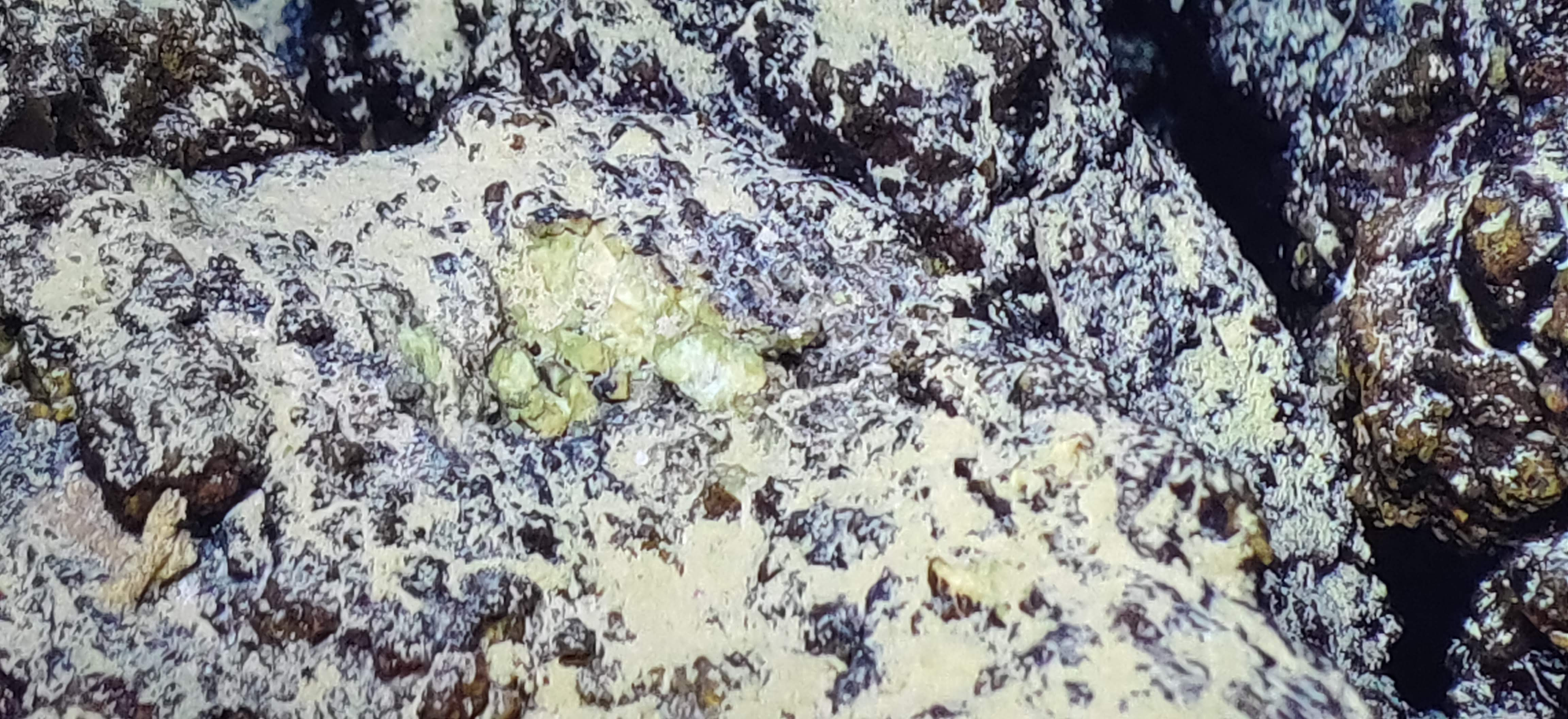
Green olivine mineral at an outcrop of the Von Damm vent field.

Fluid chemistry at Von Damm has elevated concentrations of volatiles such as hydrogen, methane, and hydrogen sulfide. Formate has also been detected in high concentrations relative to deep seawater, which may be thermodynamically favored when fluids are mixed with seawater.

== Biology ==
The biology at the Von Damm vent field are similar to those found at the Beebe site to the north, though slightly more diverse. In addition to shrimp, squat lobsters, and anemones, Von Damm features extensive coverage of limpets over rocky faces, eelpout fish at venting areas, and tube worms similar to those observed in the Pacific. Tube worms have been detected in the vicinity of Shrimp Hole, which exhibits chemical characteristics more aligned to that of a methane seep.

An abundance of mussel shells have been observed at the Von Damm field. As with other vent fields, it is possible for deepwater sharks or roaming fishes such as grenadiers to appear around the field.

=== Microbiology ===
In fluids sampled at the Von Damm field, Sulfurovum has been identified as a dominant bacteria and Methanothermacoccus have been identified as an abundant archaea. These organisms have been identified at both the Beebe and Von Damm sites of the Mid-Cayman Rise, though higher concentrations of reduced carbon species at Von Damm may be responsible for higher microbial diversity.

== Similarities to other locations ==
Von Damm is a location which has much in common with other vents situated on ocean core complexes such as the Lost City field at the Atlantis Massif. However, Von Damm exhibits chimneys atop mounds consisting of talc. Geochemically, the field is somewhat of an intermediate between hot basalt and ultramafic systems with a more neutral pH.

Tube worms are a staple to many venting fields in the Pacific but are rarely found in the Atlantic, which has sparked interest from biologists regarding potential migrations between oceans for a variety of factors.

== Gallery ==
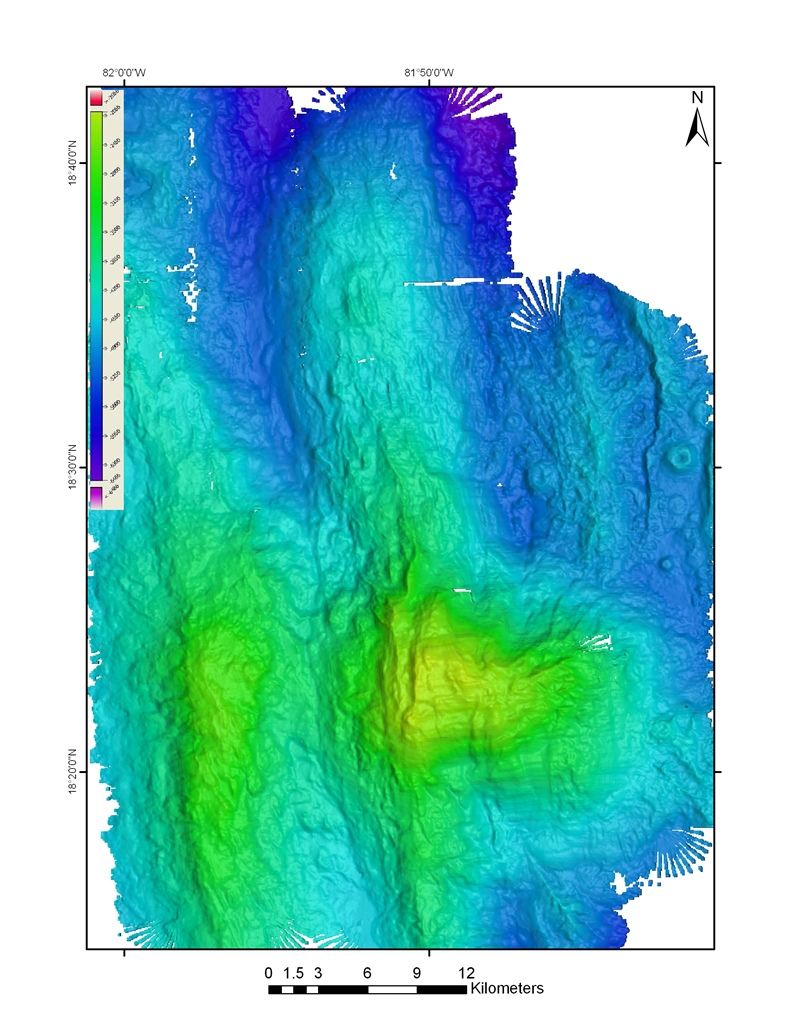
A top-down bathymetry profile over Mount Dent from the 2011 RV Okeanos Explorer cruise.

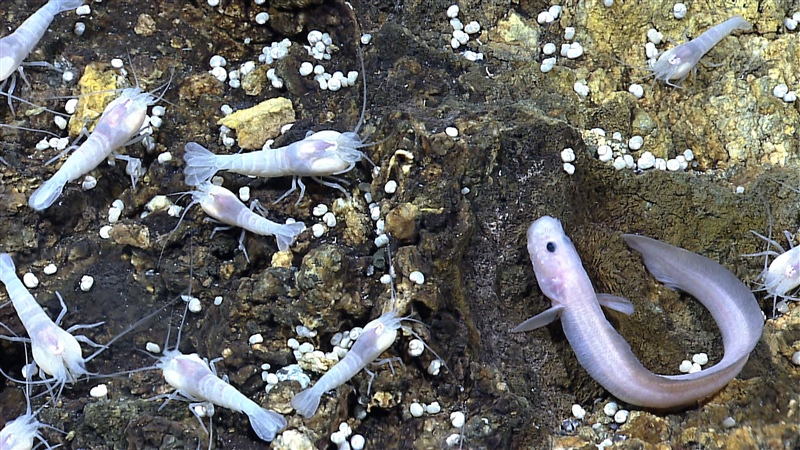
Eelpout, shrimp, and limpets consist of most of the macrobiology at sites of venting fluids

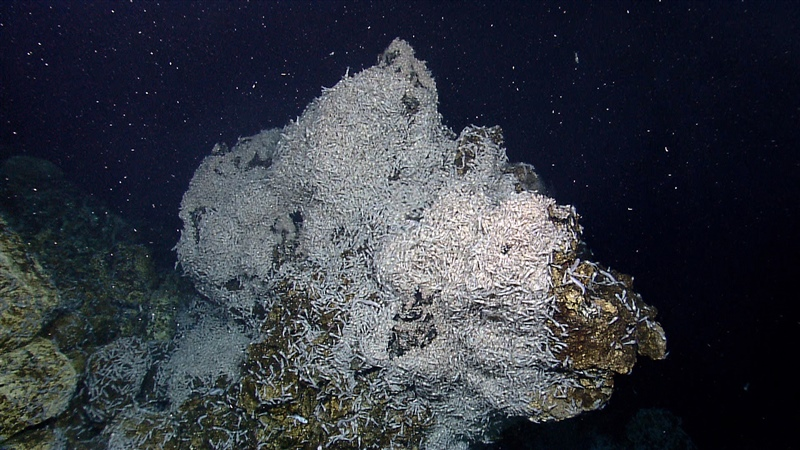
A spire, covered in shrimp

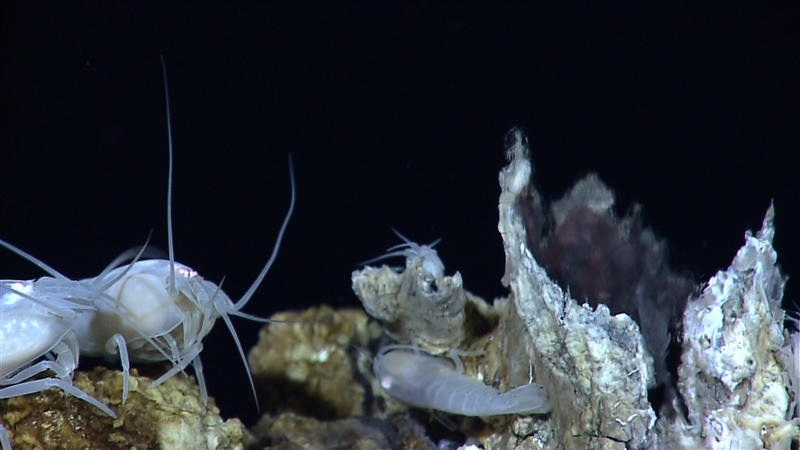
A close up of Rimicaris hybisae by a venting orifice

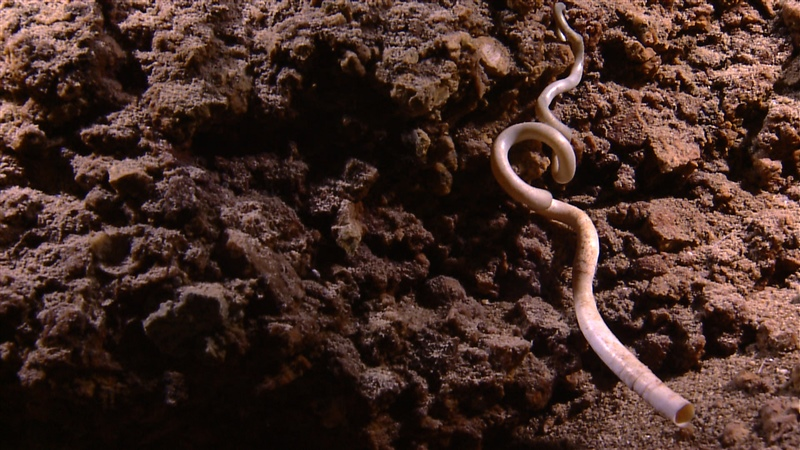
A winding tube worm

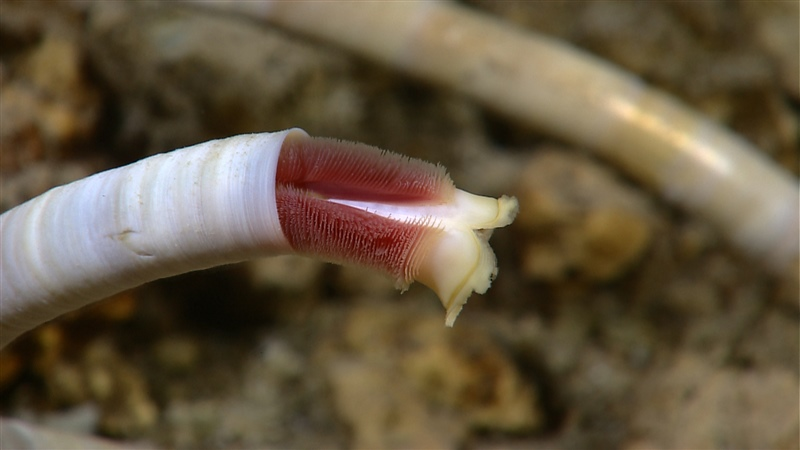
Close up of a tube worm extended for feeding

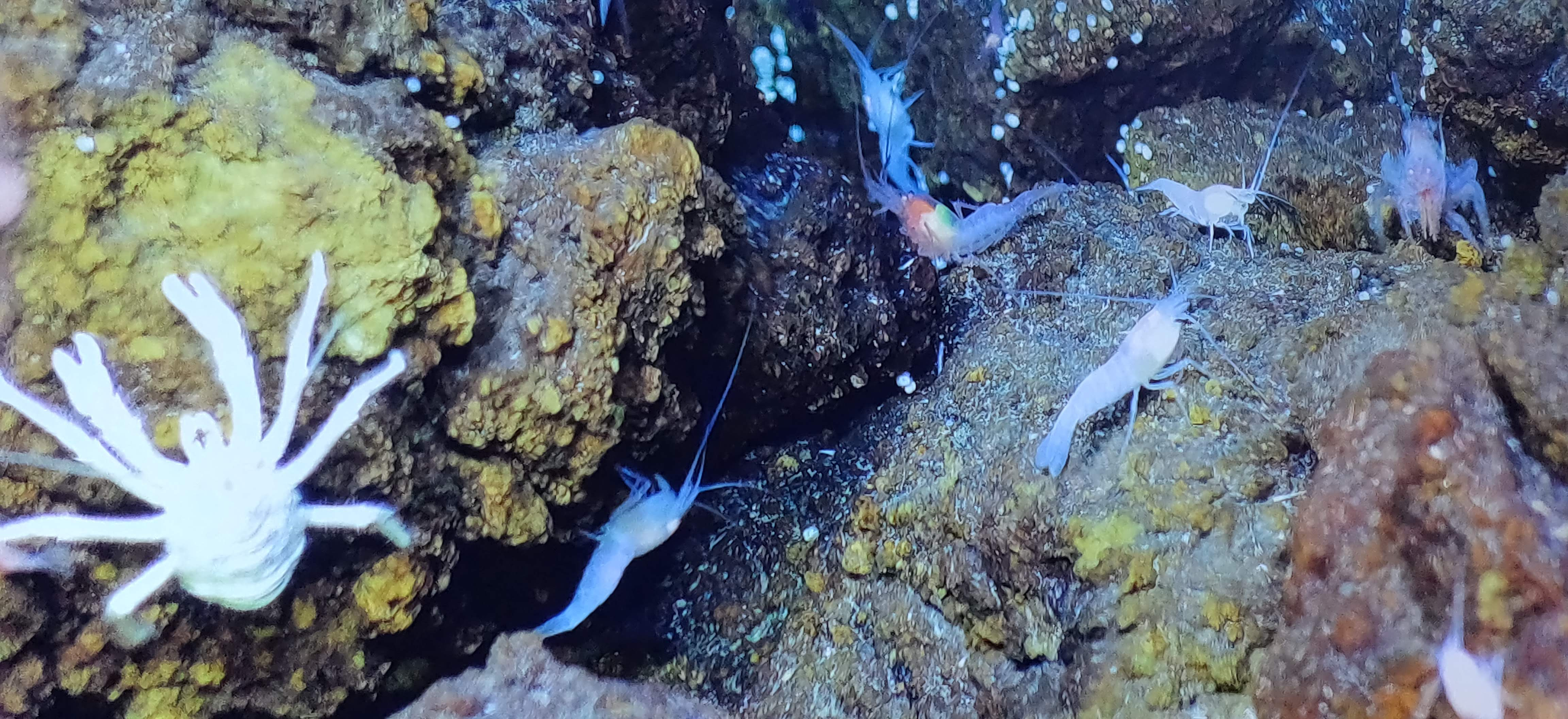
Squat lobsters and shrimp found at the Von Damm vent field

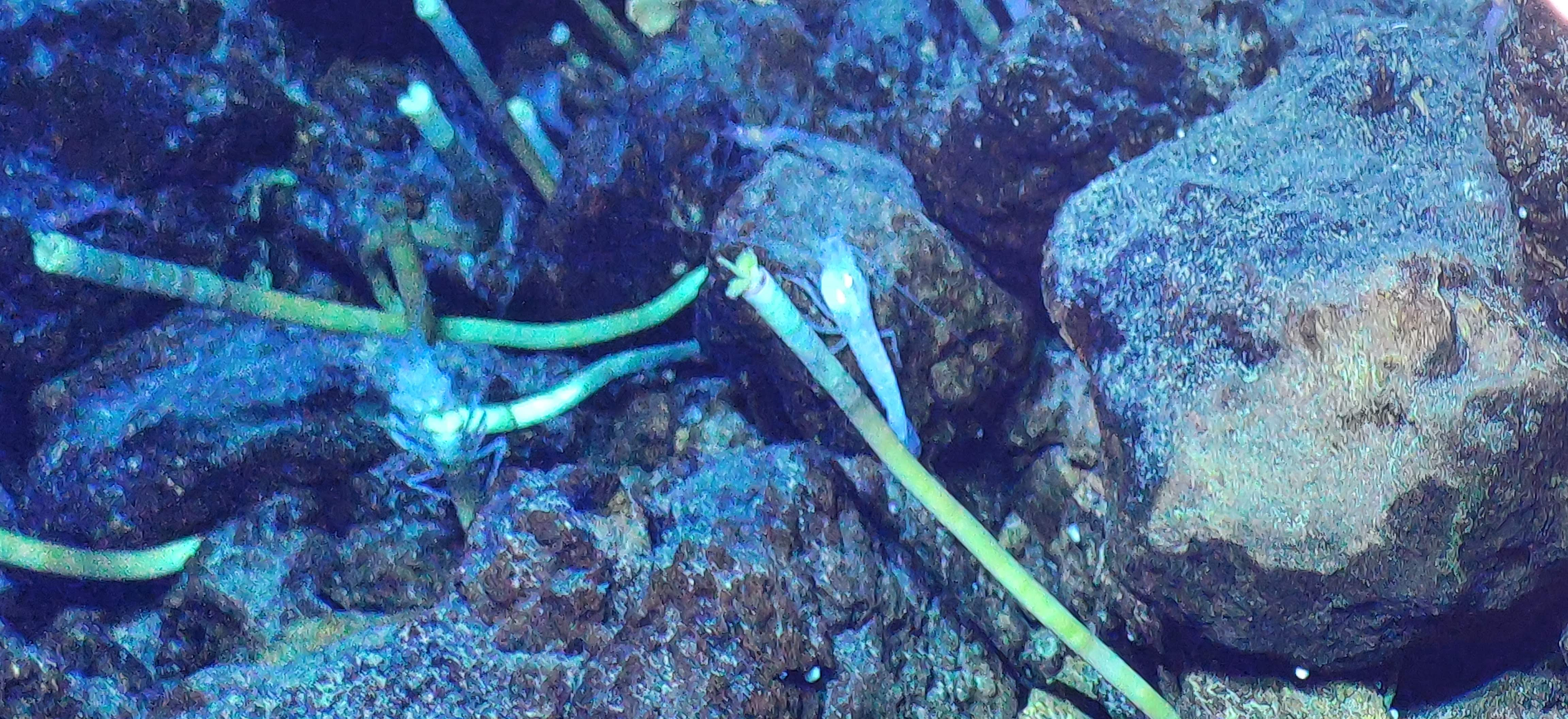
Tubeworms found at the Von Damm vent field in February 2020

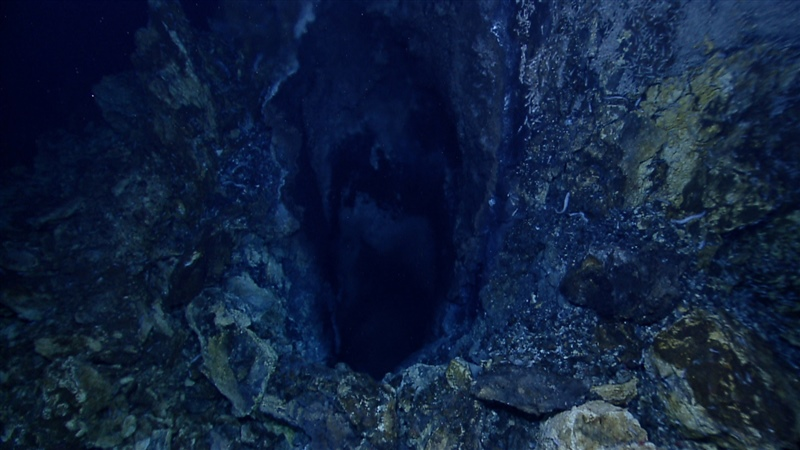
A large venting site dubbed "Hotter Than Hole"

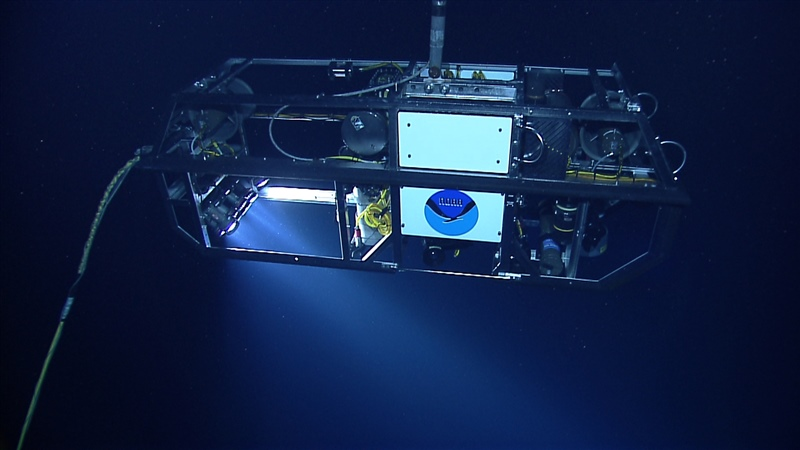
ROV Little Hercules diving at the Von Damm field in 2011

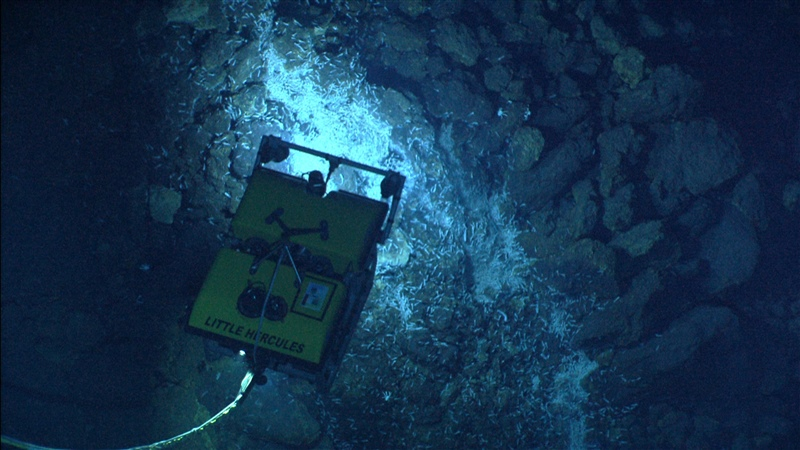
ROV Serios diving as a part of the two-body system for Little Hercules
