= Lost City Hydrothermal Field =

Hydrothermal field in the mid-Atlantic Ocean

Lost City Hydrothermal Vent Field
- A series of vents on the Atlantis Massif.
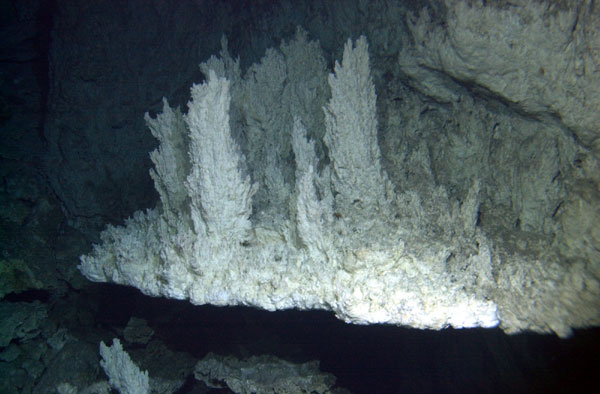
- The Lost City has numerous carbonate hydrothermal vents, including this chalky-white flange.

- Location within Earth
- Location: Mid-Atlantic Ridge
- Coordinates: 30°07′0″N 42°07′0″W
- Area: 500 square metres (5,400 sq ft)
- Max. elevation: −750 metres (−2,460 ft)
- Min. elevation: −900 metres (−3,000 ft)

The Lost City Hydrothermal Field, often referred to simply as Lost City, is an area of marine alkaline hydrothermal vents located on the Atlantis Massif at the intersection between the Mid-Atlantic Ridge and the Atlantis Transform Fault, in the Atlantic Ocean. The field is named "Lost City" due to its location on the Atlantis Mastiff, which is associated with the fictional lost city of Atlantis. It is a long-lived site of active and inactive ultramafic-hosted serpentinization, abiotically producing many simple molecules such as methane and hydrogen which are fundamental to microbial life. As such it has generated scientific interest as a prime location for investigating the origin of life on Earth and other planets similar to it.

== Expedition history ==
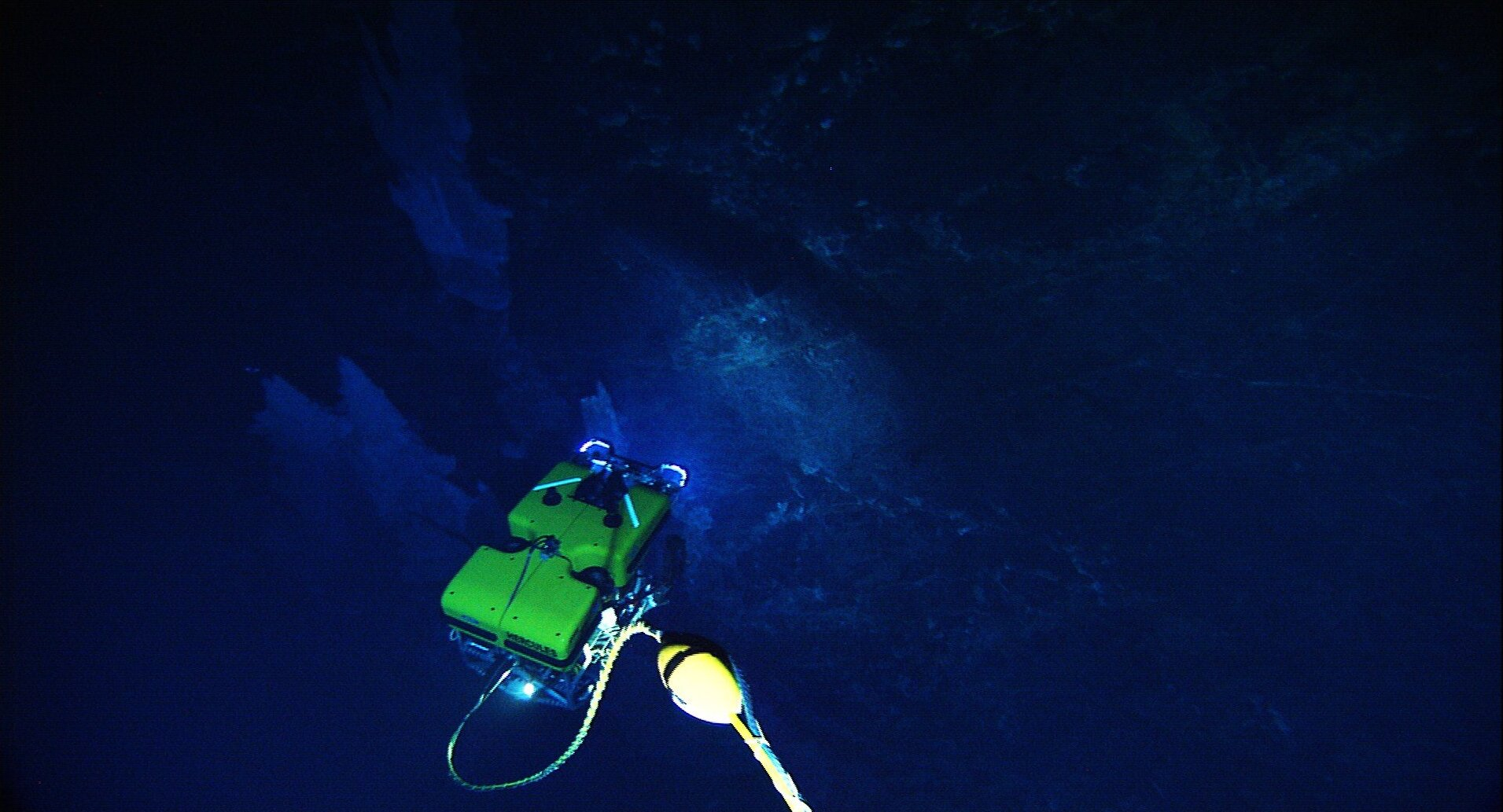
Hercules diving at the Lost City in 2005

The Lost City was first identified on December 4, 2000, using DSV Alvin and ROV ArgoII on cruise AT03-60 of the RV Atlantis. The cruise lasted 34 days, during which photographs and vent chimney samples were taken.

The discovery of the Lost City prompted the National Science Foundation to fund a second, 32-day voyage (AT07-34) to the site in 2003 in order to use Alvin and the autonomous vehicle ABE with a greater emphasis on scientific sampling and creating a high-resolution bathymetric map of the vent field. ABE would participate in a combined 17 dive expeditions including follow-up visits, creating a bathymetry profile for 3.3 square kilometres (1.3 sq mi) of the massif.

The first visit by the Integrated Ocean Drilling Program took place with Expedition 304 in late 2004, when a series of holes were drilled into the Atlantis Massif to collect large cores of rock from the site. Expedition 305 followed suit in early 2005, and 340T in 2012.

In July 2005, Lost City was explored for nine days by Hercules and Argus on the National Oceanic and Atmospheric Administration vessel Ronald H. Brown, with video streamed live to the University of Washington in Seattle. Lost City was also explored on cruise 50 of the Akademik Mstislav Keldysh, which had a greater emphasis on exploring downslope south of the vent field. The RV Knorr sailed to the Atlantis Massif in May that year for hydroacoustic measurements of potential seismic activity. Furthermore, the French EXOMAR cruise on the vessel L'Atalante was conducted in July and August 2005 to study extremophile biodiversity in deep-ocean environments.

2015 saw a visit from the International Ocean Discovery Program Expedition 357, which emphasized drilling on the Atlantis Massif to explore off-axis circulation. A series of boreholes were left behind after cores from nine different sites were taken, which were sampled by Niskin bottles. Borehole plugs were installed on two sites to allow future endeavors to sample borehole fluids.

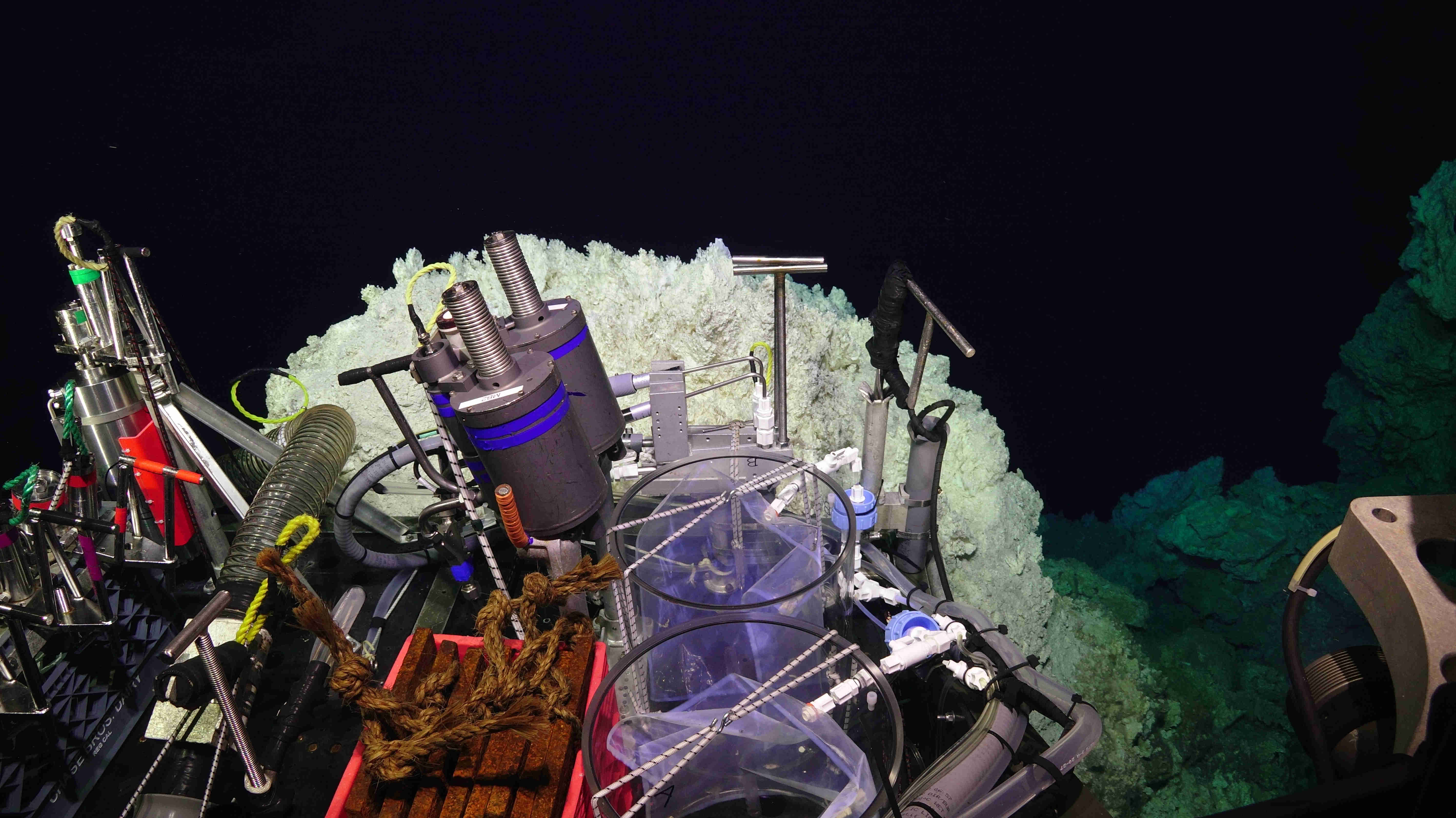
Instruments on the ROV Jason in 2018

In July and August 2018, the French TRANSECT cruise was conducted on L'Atalante utilizing the ROV VICTOR to collect a variety of measurements and samples. The following month, American cruise AT42-01, nicknamed Return to the Lost City, was undertaken to revisit the vent field after many years, featuring many members of the original discovery team in 2000. Photographs, ambient gases, cells for cultures, rock, vent fluid, and ambient seawater samples were collected using the ROV Jason II and a CTD Niskin rosette. The mission's key objectives were to collect biological and geochemical samples for researching sources of energy for microbial life. They also followed up on the 2015 borehole expedition by attempting to sample from the drilled holes for access to residual fluids.

In March 2023, the first cruise of the RV Falkor Too was undertaken to deploy a new in-situ methane sensor to search for hydrothermal activity similar to that of Lost City along the Mid-Atlantic Ridge. ROV dives were live-streamed to the Schmidt Ocean Institute's website. The cruise concluded on April 11, having identified new black-smoker vents.

== Geography ==
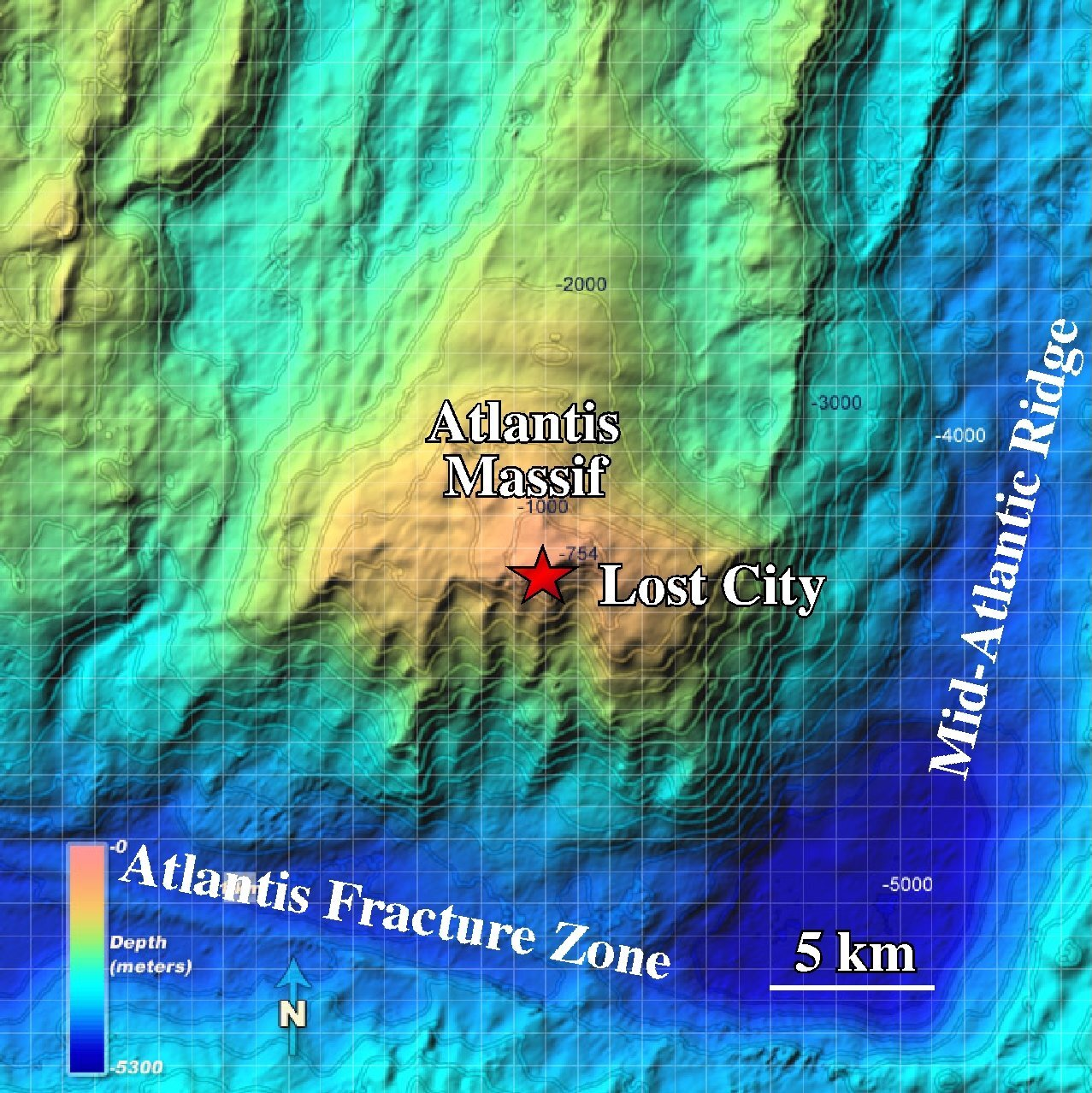
Map of the Lost City on the Atlantis Massif

Lost City is located in the North Atlantic Ocean on the seafloor mountain Atlantis Massif, which is approximately the size of Mount Rainier. The site is described as a long-lived vent field, estimated to be older than 120,000 years by radiocarbon dating the oldest chimney deposits of the field. However, this is significantly younger than the age of the Atlantis Massif itself, which may be as old as two million years. Lost City is located on a shelf approximately 70 metres (230 ft) below the massif summit at a depth of around 750–900 m (2,460–2,950 ft), with an approximate area of 500 square metres (5,400 sq ft). The massif itself may have originated in a similar manner to many other ocean core complexes.

Lost City is a location dominated by steep cliffs to the south, chimneys, and mounds of carbonate material deposited from chimneys that collapse as they age. Breccia, gabbros, and peridotites are dominating rock types as one maneuvers away from the field, which are prone to mass wasting as the bathymetry steepens. Mass-wasting events of the past are evident by bountiful scarps on the slope of the massif. Rubble tends to accumulate at areas no steeper than 60 degrees bounding the field, and can undergo lithification depending on how far it is located from Lost City.

Of the 30 active and inactive vent chimneys, Poseidon is the largest and most-studied within the vent field. Poseidon stands about 60 metres (200 ft) tall and 100 metres (330 ft) wide and has numerous orifices venting hot fluids. The vent nicknamed Beehive, for its distinct shape upon discovery, is about one meter tall and located on the south side of Poseidon. Furthermore, the IMAX tower stands approximately 8 metres (26 ft) tall on the north side of Poseidon, though the chimney has stalagmite-like growths that are as tall as 30 metres (98 ft). IMAX has a large flange which catches hot, escaping fluid and has a very apparent biofilm acting within it.

Other chimneys, such as Ryan and Nature to the east of Poseidon, also have flange and beehive-like structures, though they are significantly smaller and vent significantly less than Poseidon. Several inactive vents are located about 100 metres (330 ft) south of Poseidon, though they only stand a few meters tall.

Since the location of the massif is upon a slow to ultra-slow spreading center, there are a large number of faults that run through the vent field. Many faults, especially at the south side, are high-angle normal faults that can be concealed by debris. Most of the vents found tend to run from east to west, likely due to the orientation of fault lines under the field.

Two extinct fields are located about 300 metres (980 ft) west and 450 metres (1,480 ft) southwest of the central vent field at depths of 1,000 metres (3,300 ft) or more. They have inactive vents similar in profile to Poseidon with a talus (scree) deposit separating them from the central vent field, though they have not been as actively explored. It is hypothesized from the ages of samples collected that hot fluid flow migrated from the south to the north where Poseidon currently resides.

Strontium, carbon, and oxygen isotope data and radiocarbon ages document at least 30,000 years of hydrothermal activity driven by serpentinization reactions at Lost City, making Lost City older than all known black smoker vents by at least two orders of magnitude.

== Geology and chemistry ==
Alkaline hydrothermal vents like those of Lost City are only superficially related to volcanic black smoker vents; the two types of vent are perhaps better described by their differences than their similarities. Though both types are often found near oceanic spreading centers, alkaline hydrothermal vents are not created by volcanic processes. They release methane and diatomic hydrogen into the surrounding water; they do not produce significant amounts of carbon dioxide, hydrogen sulfide, or metals, which are the major outputs of volcanic black smoker vents. The temperature and pH of water surrounding the two types of vent is also significantly different.

=== Mineralogy ===
The Mid-Atlantic Ridge spreading center pulls the lithosphere apart, creating normal faults which expose sub-surface rocks to seawater.

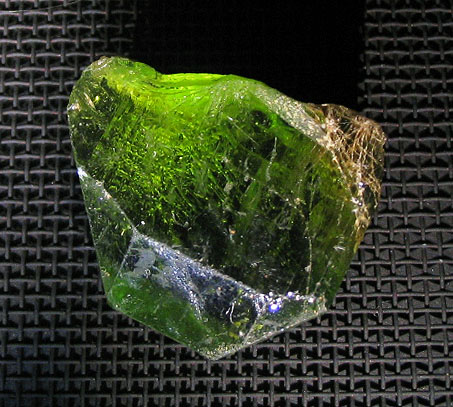
Olivine, the mineral responsible for Lost City's serpentinization.

The Atlantis Massif is described as an ultramafic oceanic core complex of the Mid-Atlantic Ridge, with upper mantle rock being exposed to seawater through faulting from tectonic extension associated with oceanic spreading centers. The spreading half-rate is approximated to about 12 mm/yr, classifying it as a slow-spreading ridge. Seismic events of Richter magnitude 4 and 4.5 have been detected at the massif.

The dominant minerals found at Lost City are ultramafic, composed primarily of olivine and pyroxene with very little silica content. Peridotite (primarily spinel harzburgite) minerals undergo serpentinization and form magnetite and serpentine minerals. Because little to no carbon dioxide or metals are released in the venting fluids, Lost City bears the appearance of a non-smoker, with few particulates to give a smoky appearance.

Once pore waters have permeated the surface, aragonite, brucite, and calcite chimneys are formed as calcium carbonates precipitate out of solution. Younger chimneys are primarily brucite and aragonite, being white and flaky in appearance. As vents mature, porosity decreases as precipitates clog fluid pathways. Mineral compositions change with aragonite succeeded by calcite and brucite being removed through dissolution, and the chimneys darken to a grey or brown color.

On the side of the Atlantis Transform Fault, the Atlantis Massif wall terminates approximately 740 metres (2,430 ft) below sea level, where rock types deform to various mylonitic rocks with deformation fabric minerals of talc, tremolite, and ribbon serpentine.

=== Serpentinization ===
Lost City is an exemplary location for the study of abiotic methanogenesis and hydrogenesis, as serpentinization reactions produce methane and hydrogen. Supplementing Fischer-Tropsch reactions;

+ + → + +	Methanogenesis

+ → + +	Hydrogenesis

The reactions are exothermic and warm the surrounding waters via reaction heating, though fluid temperatures are still relatively low (40°–90 °C) when compared to other hydrothermal systems. Furthermore, local pH is increased to values of over 9, which enables calcium carbonate precipitation. Since serpentinization is particularly extensive, carbon dioxide concentrations are also very low. Low temperature, carbon dioxide concentrations, as well as the low hydrogen sulfide and metal content of the plume make the vents more difficult to identify from CTD measurements or optical backscatter methods.

== Biology ==
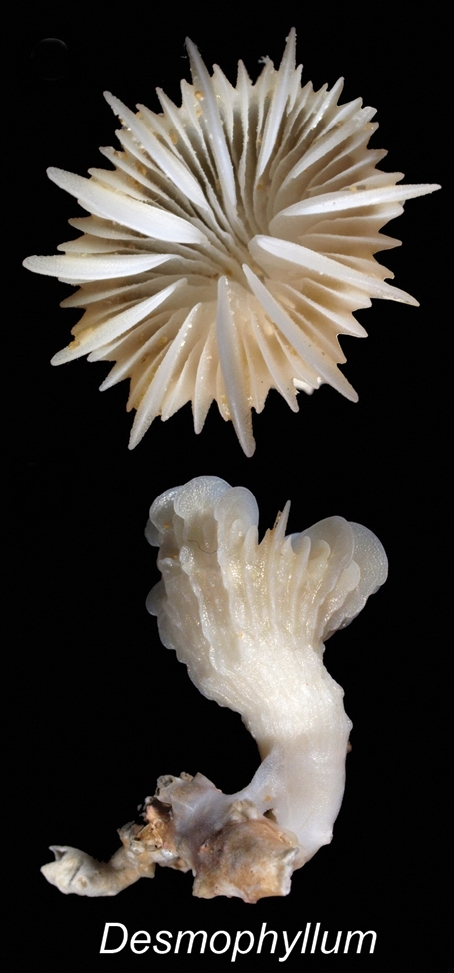
Desmophyllum have been observed at the Lost City field

Lost City and other hydrothermal vent systems support vastly different lifeforms due to Lost City's unique chemistry. A variety of microorganisms live in, on, and around the vents. Methanosarcinales-like archaea form thick biofilms inside the vents where they subsist on hydrogen and methane; bacteria related to the Bacillota also live inside the vents. External to the vents, archaea, including the newly described ANME-1, and bacteria, including Pseudomonadota, oxidise methane and sulfur as their primary sources of energy.

Lost City also supports a variety of small invertebrates associated with the carbonate structures, including small corals, snails, bivalves, polychaetes, amphipods, and ostracods. Desmophyllum corals and nematode worms have been observed living on the carbonate chimneys. Other animals such as tube worms and giant clams that are abundant in typical black smoker vents, however, are absent from Lost City. A variety of crabs, shrimp, sea fans, and jellyfish have also been observed at the field.

Macrofauna are rare around the vent field, though larger organisms do visit the field on occasion. Visitors can include wreckfish, grenadiers, and even sharks. Arrowtooth Eel have been observed at the Lost City field, which have a massive depth range of −120 metres (−390 ft) to −4,800 metres (−15,700 ft).

== Significance ==
Lost City provides geologists, chemists, and biologists a working ecosystem for the study of life in extreme environments and other processes driven by abiotic production of methane and hydrogen by serpentinisation.

=== Similarities to other locales ===
The Lost City vent field shares a number of characteristics with the Prony Bay vent field near New Caledonia in the Pacific Ocean. Both are locations of moderate temperature which produce abundant hydrogen gas and methane. Prony Bay is significantly shallower than Lost City, at less than 50 metres (160 ft) below the surface compared with around 800 metres (2,600 ft) for Lost City. It is host to unique biology, including the extremophile Alkaliphilus hydrothermalis.

Another alkaline hydrothermal vent, the Strytan Hydrothermal Field, has been identified off the north coast of Iceland. It is significantly shallower and fluids are primarily supplied by fresh, terrestrial water.

The Von Damm Vent Field found in the Caribbean Sea is also situated atop an ocean core complex.

=== Origin of life ===
Speculation has been offered that ancient versions of similar alkaline hydrothermal vents in the seas of a young Earth were the birthplace of all life, constituting the planet's original abiogenesis. The free hydrogen gas produced, metallic catalysts consistent with an iron-sulfur world theory, micro-cellular physical structure of the towers, and available hydrothermal energy might plausibly have provided an environment for the beginnings of non-photosynthetic energy cycles common to the most primitive microorganisms and organic molecule creation. Microscopic structures in such alkaline vents "show interconnected compartments that provide an ideal hatchery for the origin of life".

These alkaline hydrothermal vents also continuously generate acetyl thioesters, providing both the starting point for more complex organic molecules and the energy needed to produce them. However, this notion was rejected by Japanese researchers from Earth-Life Science Institute (ELSI), Tokyo Institute of Technology. They showed that because of the high free energy change of thioester hydrolysis and their corresponding low equilibrium constants, it is unlikely that these species could have accumulated abiotically to any significant extent in the Lost City fields.

The conditions at Lost City are of particular concern because of the different types of extremophiles present. Lost City microbes are polyextremophiles, fitting the description of alkaliphiles, moderate piezophiles, and thermophiles in an environment without sunlight. The combination of different extremophile elements suggests that Lost City organisms are more extreme than at other locations, making them particularly interesting subjects of study on the requirements for life.

Given the only requirements for serpentinization are olivine and seawater, locations like Lost City could theoretically exist on extraterrestrial bodies with liquid water such as Europa and Enceladus.

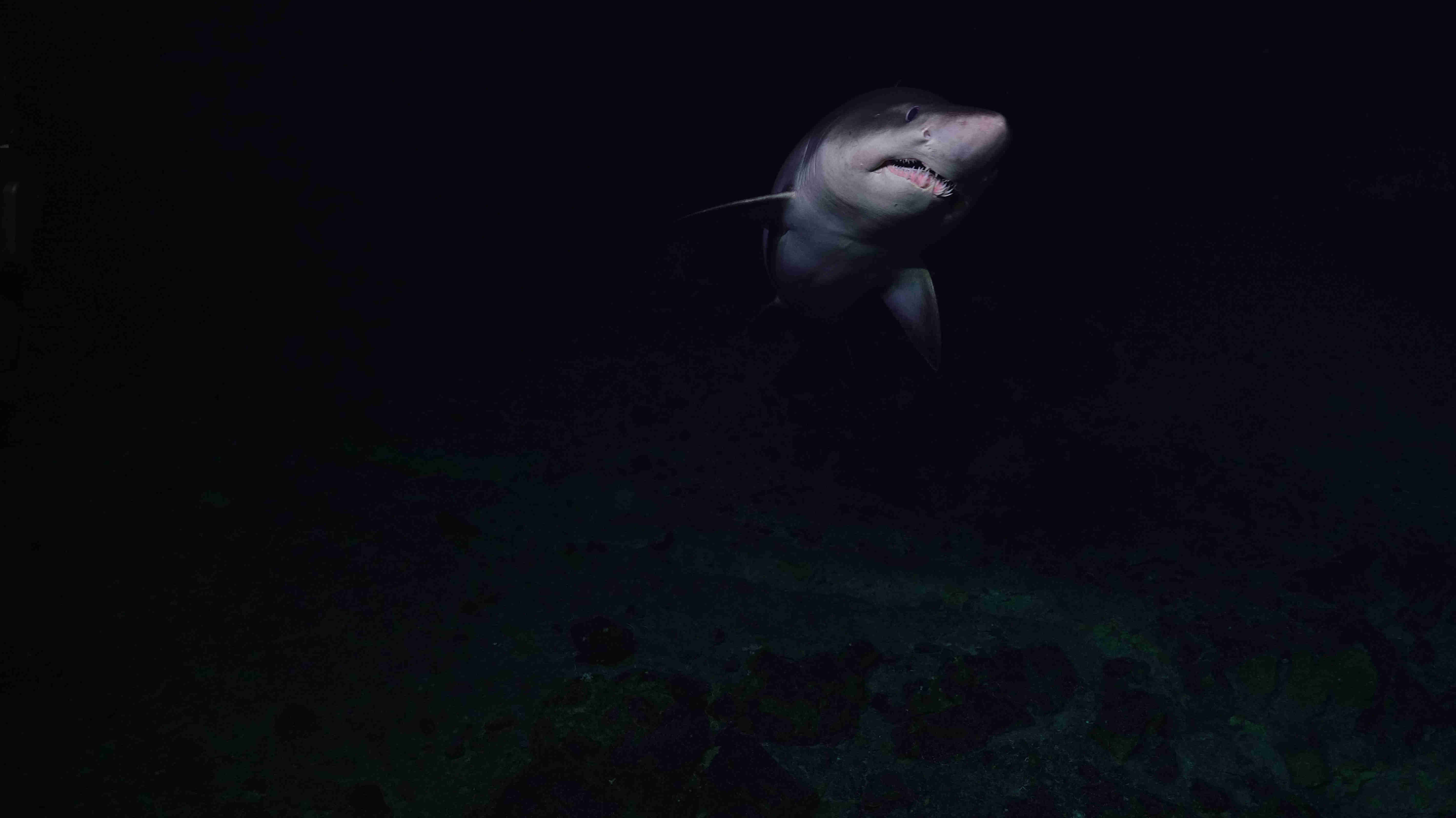
A visiting shark at the Lost City field

== In popular culture ==
Lost City is featured in the Disney 3-D IMAX film Aliens of the Deep. The IMAX flange was unnamed prior to the documentary's release, but is extremely recognizable in the film and subsequently picked up the nickname of the video format played in theaters.

Lost City is also featured in episode 2 of the BBC's documentary Blue Planet II.

== Gallery ==
Images at Lost City
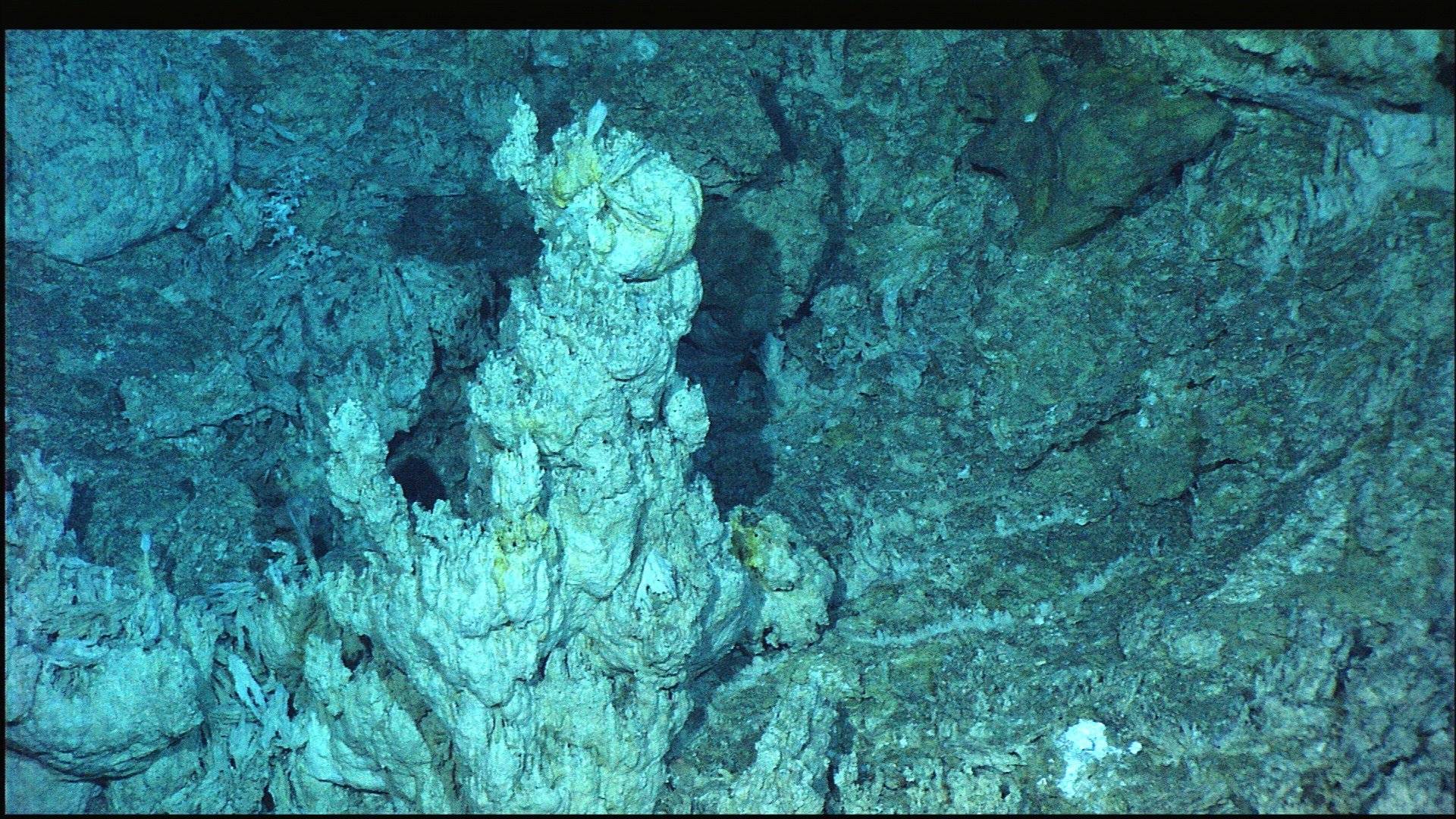
A white carbonate spire in the Lost City vent field.

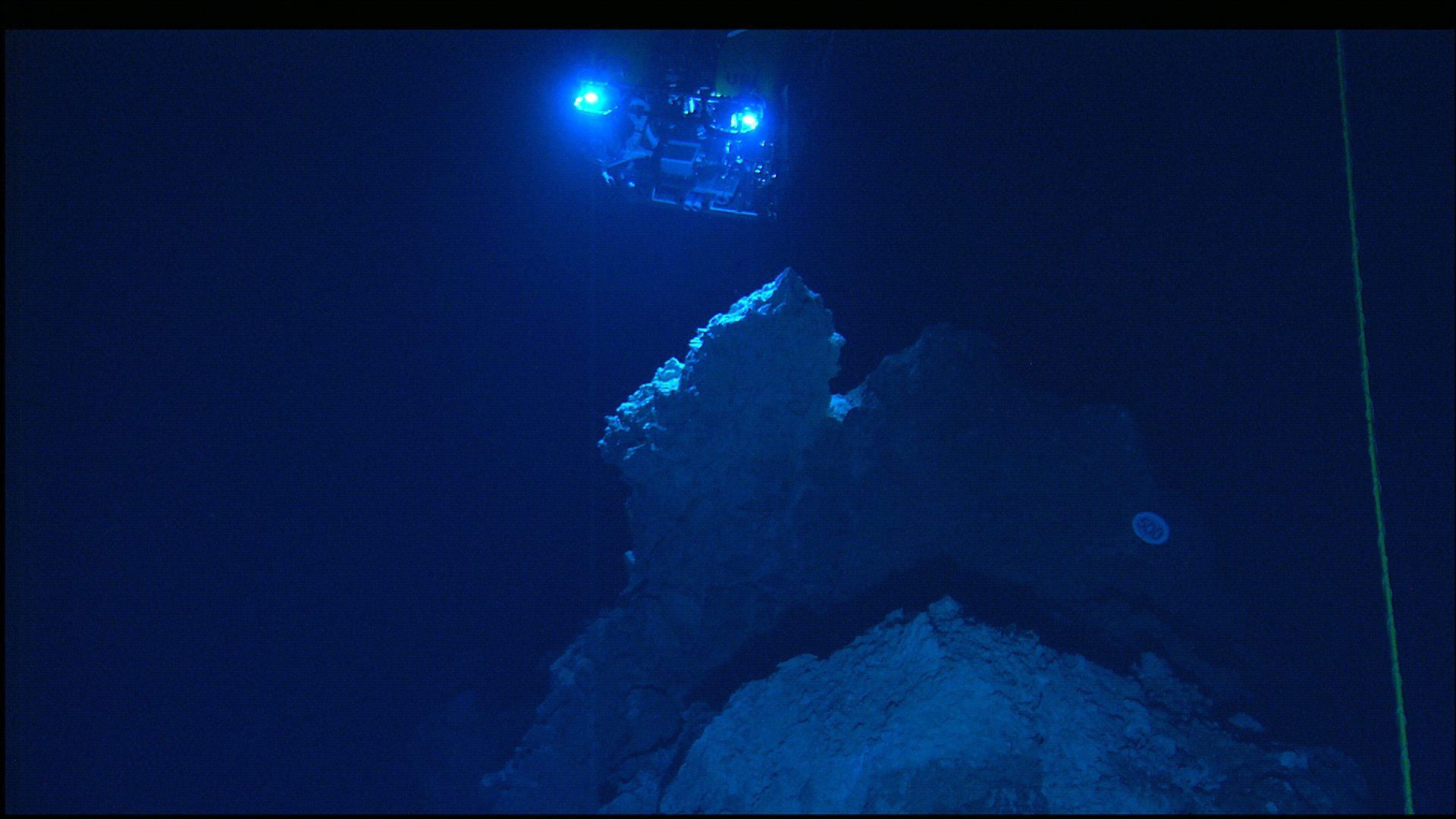
Hercules maneuvers around rocky spires.

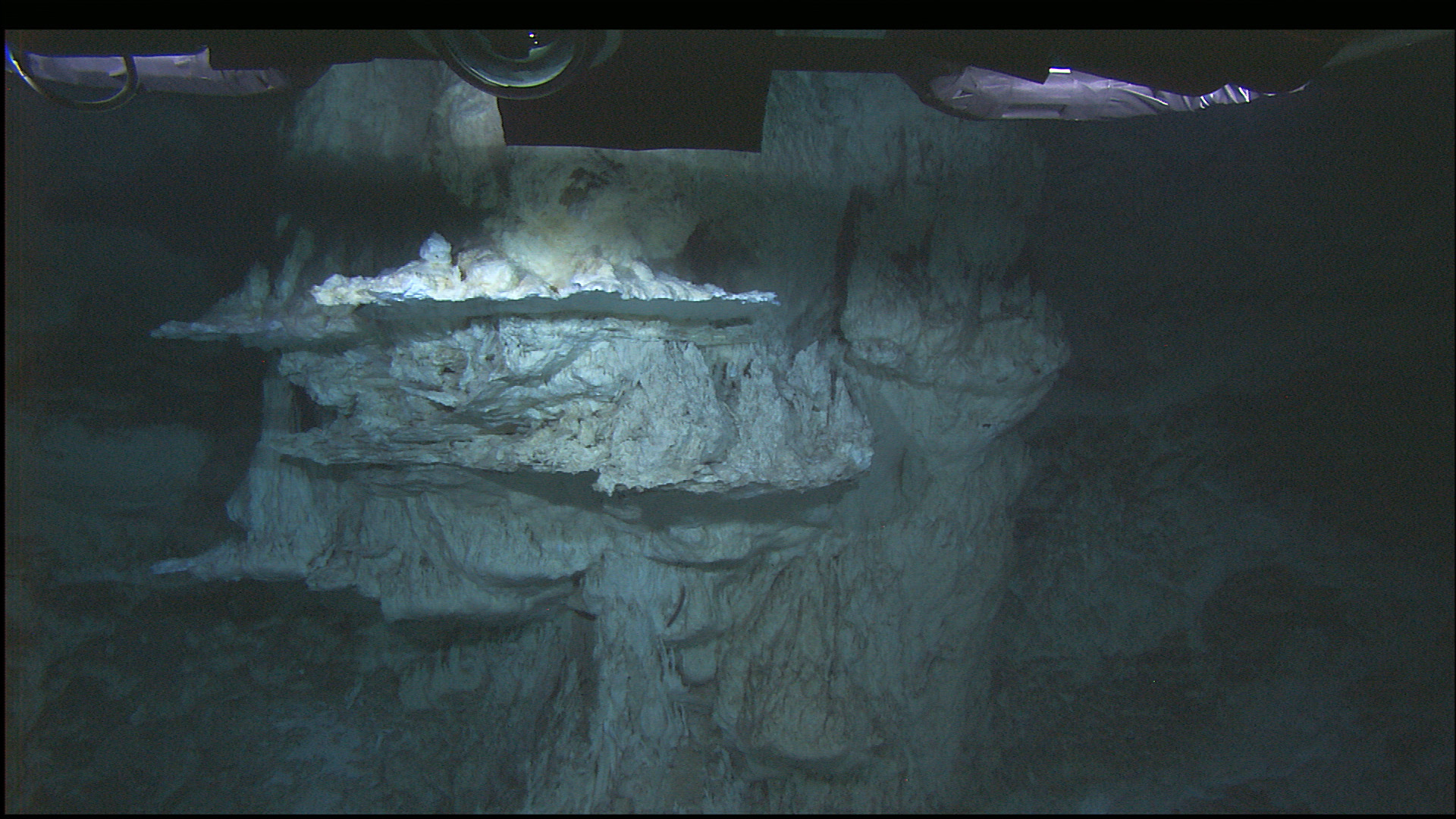
View of a flange from the underbelly of an ROV.

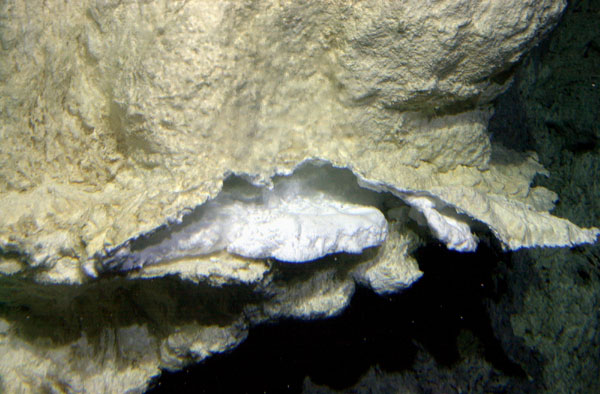
Warm vent fluids coming from the pristine interior of a broken flange.

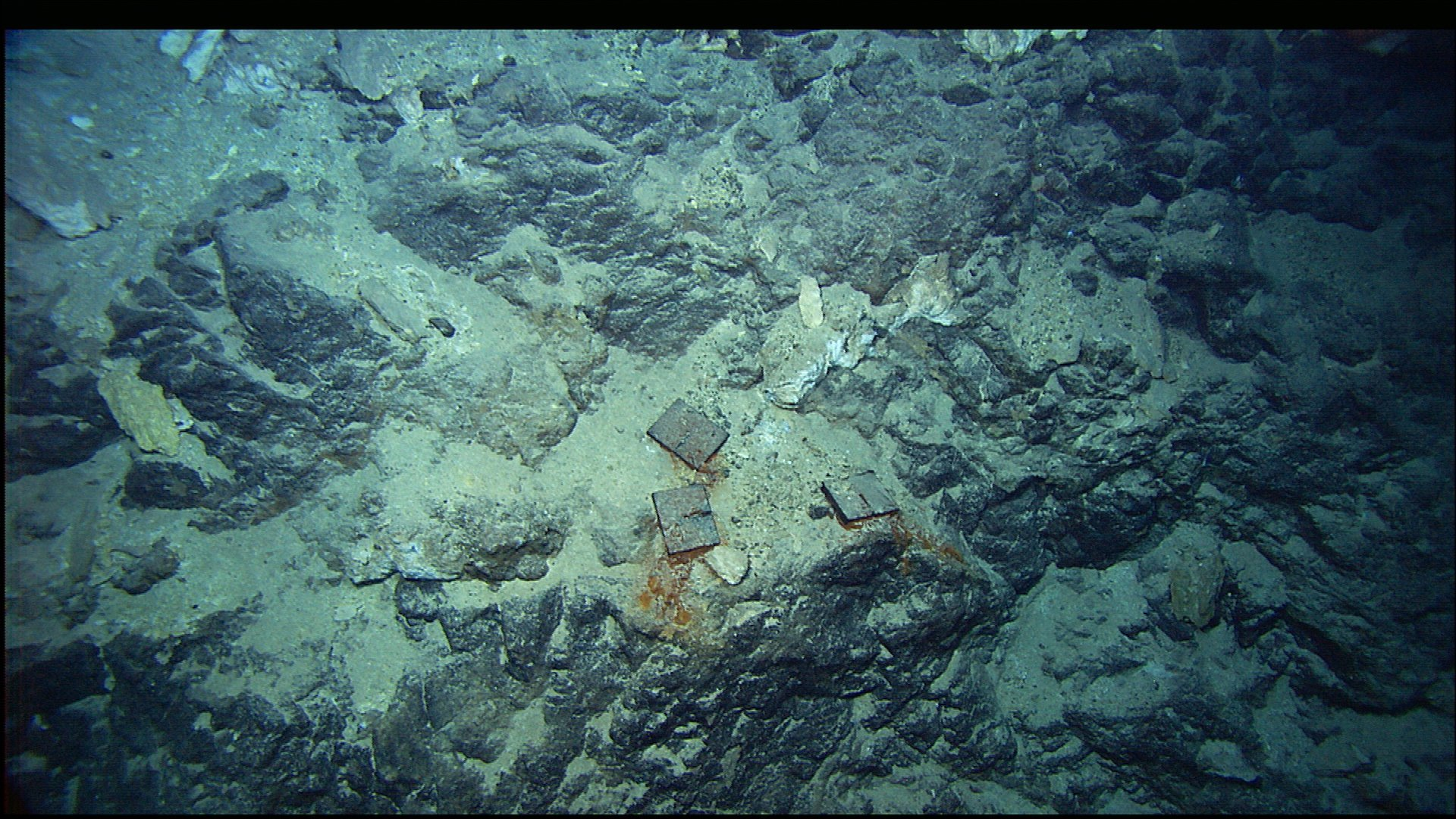
Iron plates dropped on the seafloor as ballast.

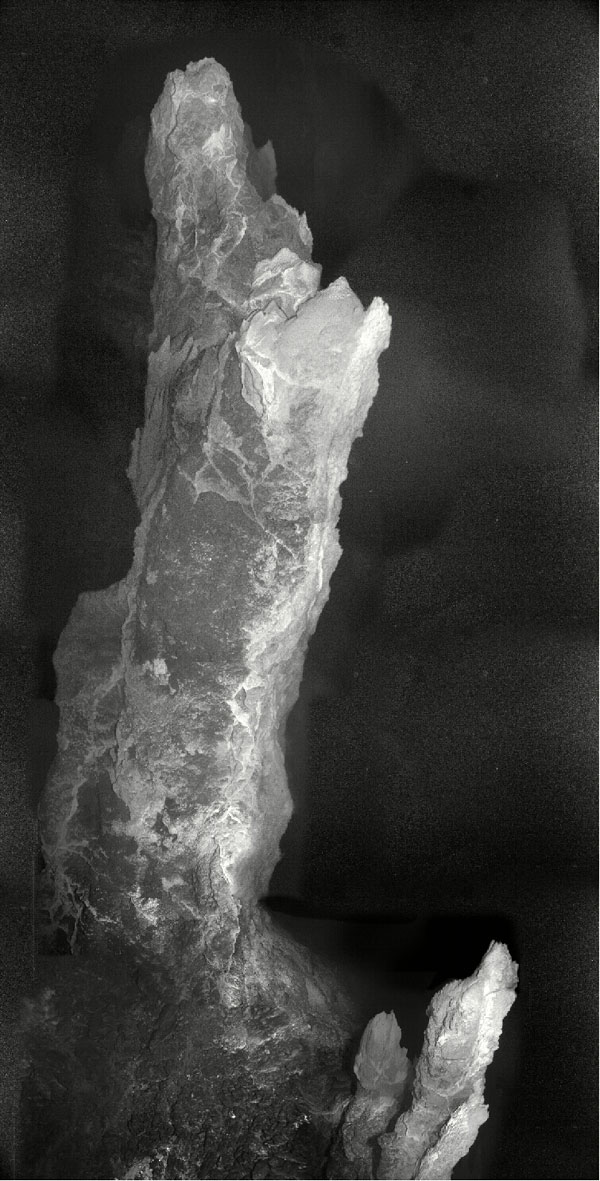
A 9.1 metres (30 ft) chimney at Lost City.

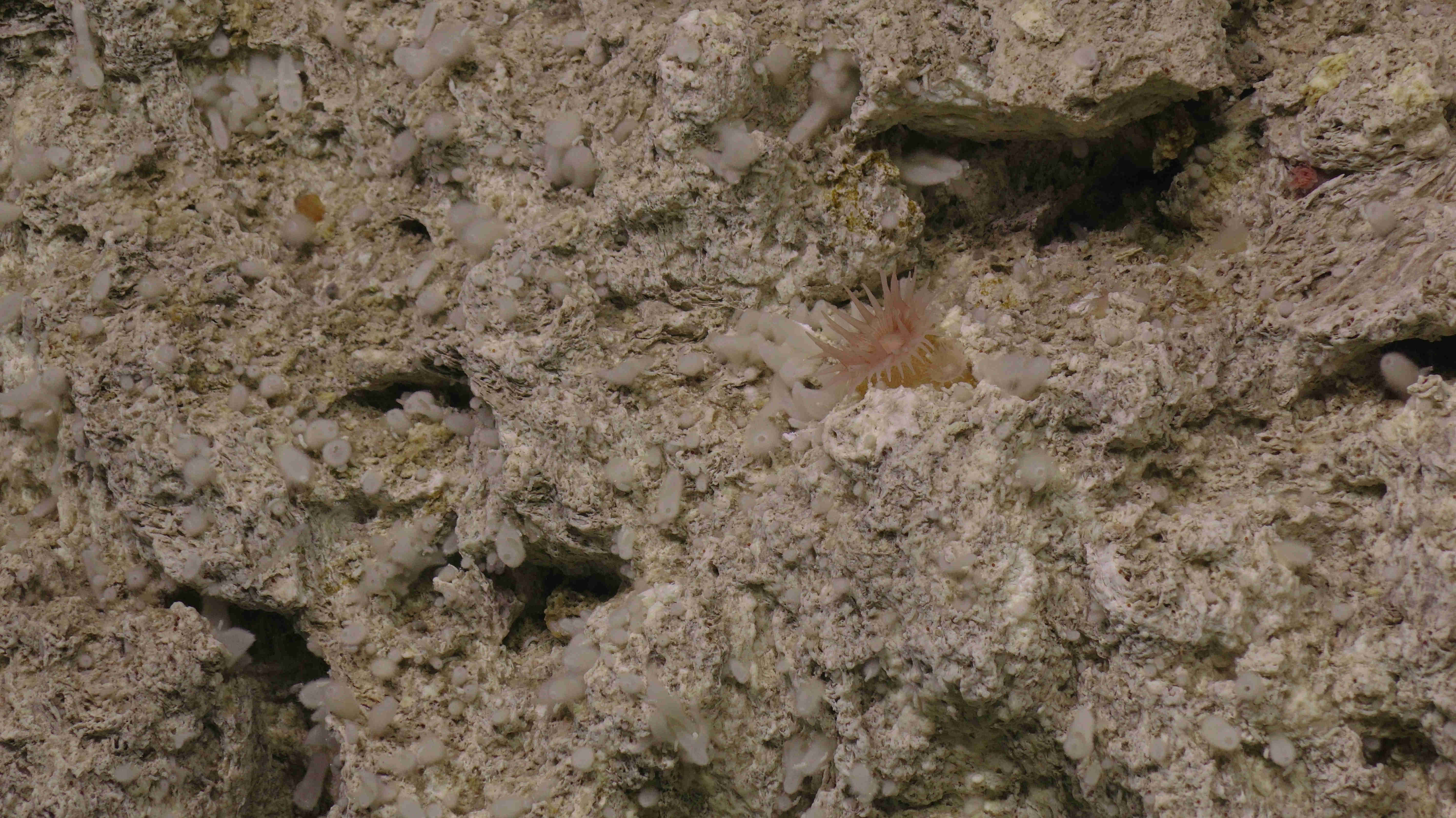
An anemone growing on carbonate chimney rock.

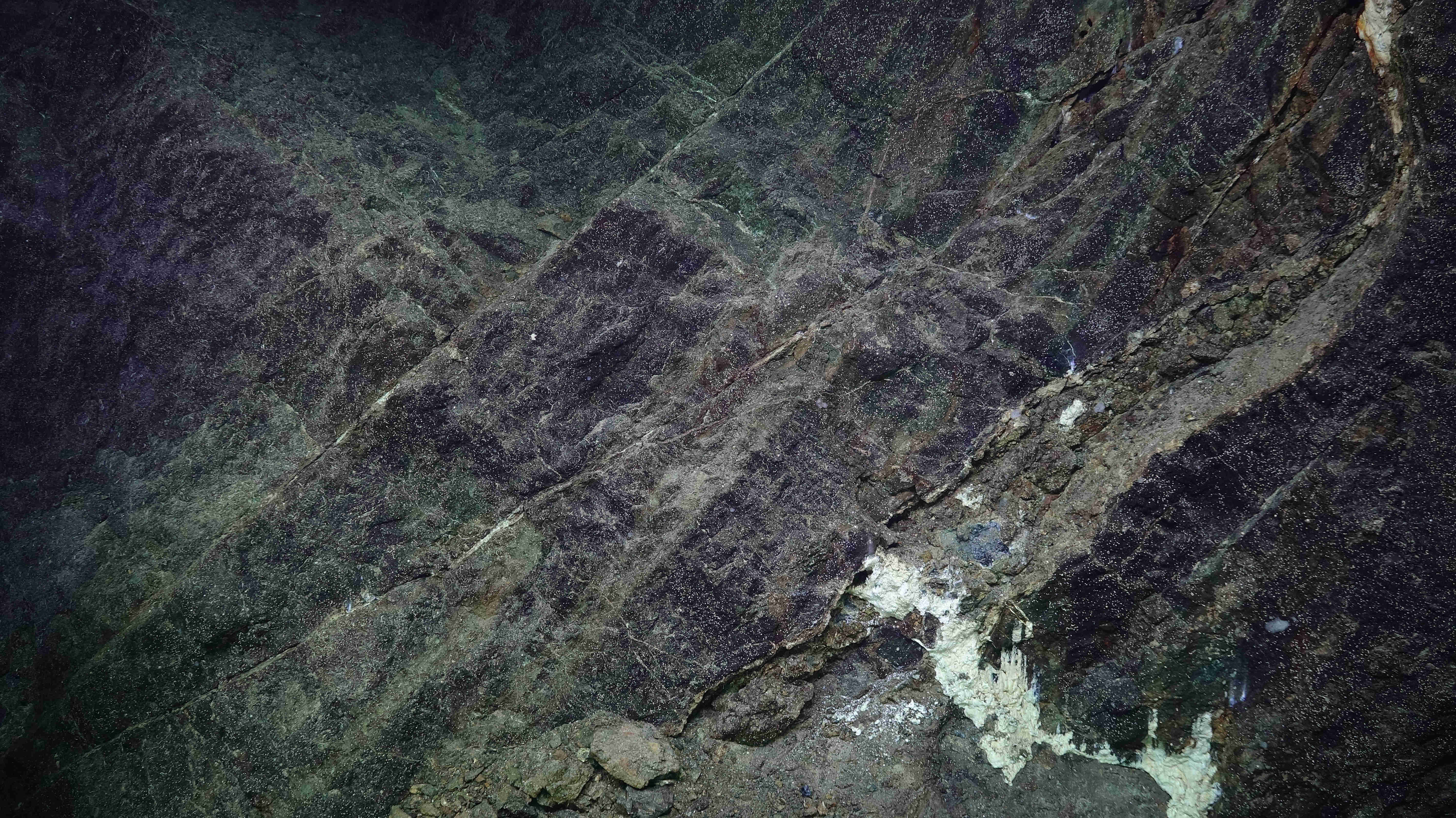
Basement rock is the foundation for most serpentinization at the Lost City.

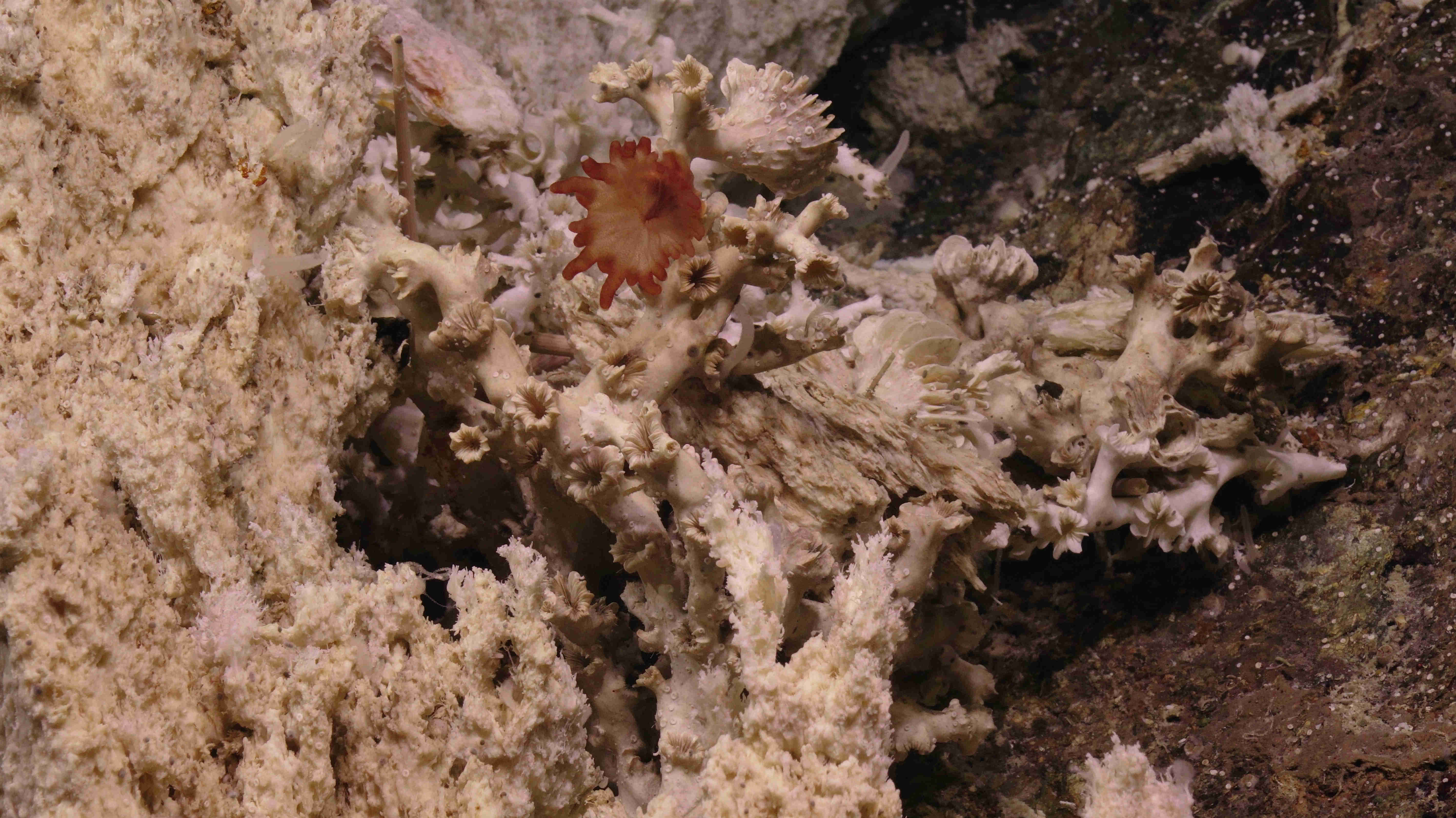
Coral growing on carbonate chimney rock.

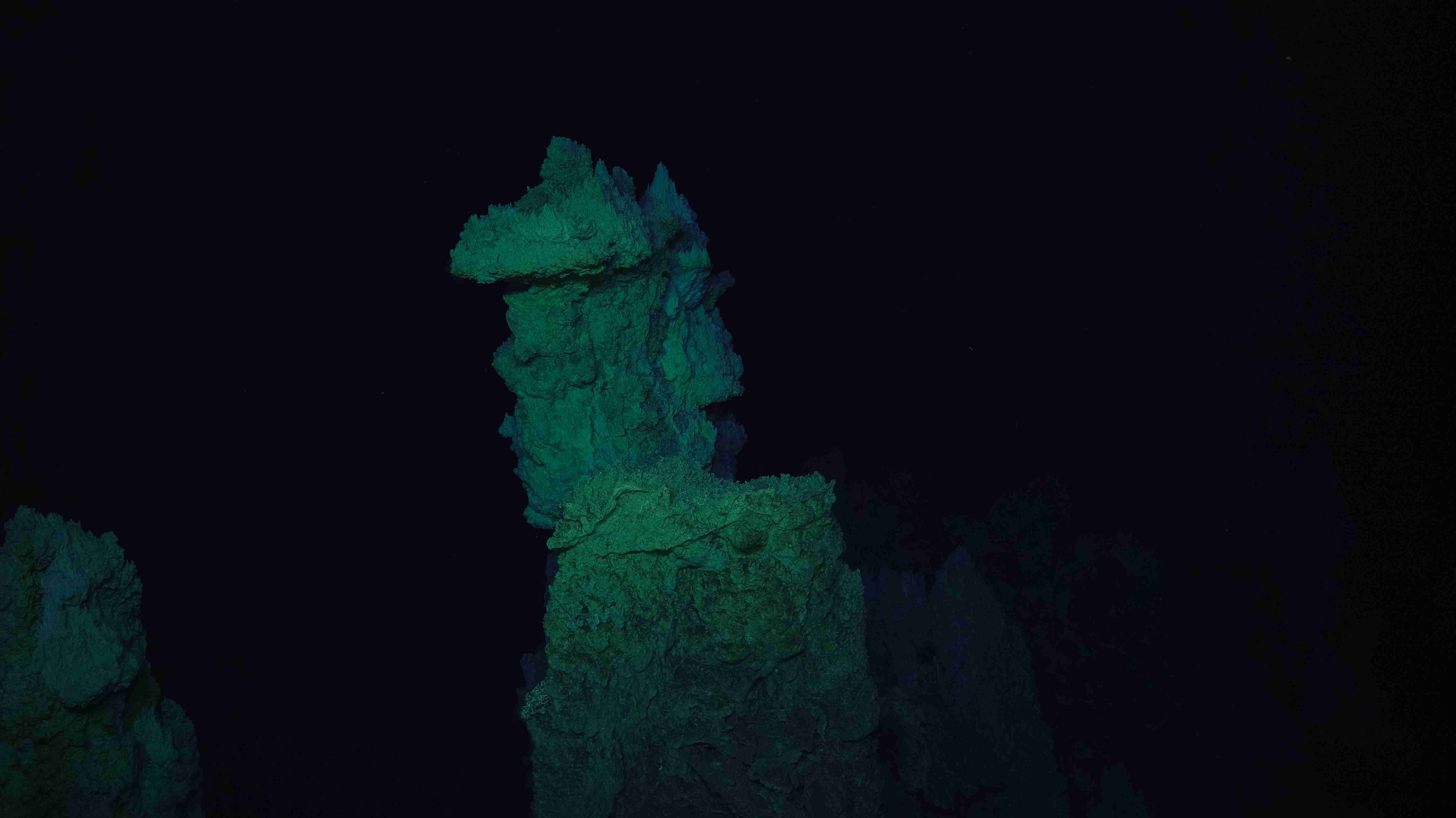
A chimney appears from the darkness at the Lost City field.

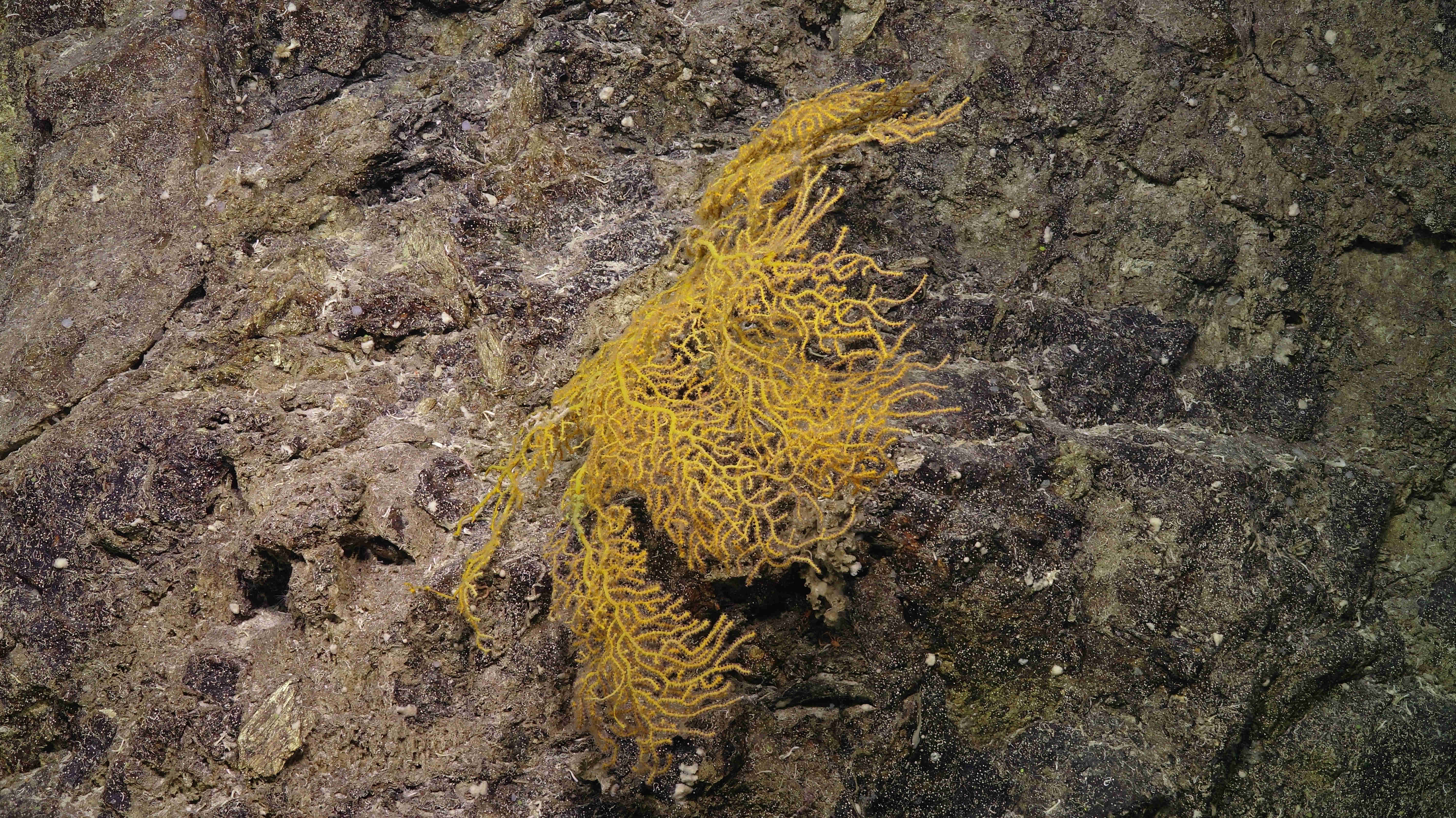
A deepwater sea fan.

== Protection ==
The carbonate spires of the Lost City Hydrothermal Field are on UNESCO's protection wish list.
