= Karen Von Damm =

American geochemist and researcher

- Born: February 7, 1955
- Died: August 15, 2008 (aged 53); Durham, New Hampshire
- Education: Yale University, WHOI-MIT Joint Program
- Scientific career
- Thesis: Chemistry of submarine hydrothermal solutions at 21^{o} North, East Pacific Rise and Guaymas Basin, Gulf of California (1983)
- Doctoral advisor: John Edmond

Karen Louise Von Damm (February 7, 1955 – August 15, 2008) was an American marine geochemist who studied underseas hydrothermal vent systems. Her work on black smoker hot springs after they were first discovered on the mid-ocean ridge in 1979 significantly advanced understanding of how vent fluids acquire their chemical composition and how those chemicals support biological communities. An area of hydrothermal vents located just south of Grand Cayman in the Caribbean was named the Von Damm Vent Field in her honor.

== Early life and education ==
Von Damm grew up in the Astoria neighborhood of the borough of Queens in New York City, New York. Her father, H.W. Von Damm, ran a family business in Brooklyn, New York. Von Damm credits her mother giving her the initial interest in chemistry, as her mother was a chemistry major and gave Von Damm a chemistry set one Christmas as a young child. Von Damm attended Stuyvesant High School in Manhattan borough, New York City, New York.

Von Damm earned her B.S. degree in geology and geophysics from Yale University in 1977, completing a senior thesis in geochemistry researching radioactive ^{210}Pb in lacustrine and marine environments under the mentorship of Karl Turekian. Her Ph.D. in oceanography was earned through the Woods Hole Oceanographic Institution (WHOI) and Massachusetts Institute of Technology (MIT) Joint Program in 1983 under her adviser John Edmond. Her dissertation is titled Chemistry of submarine hydrothermal solutions at 21^{o} North, East Pacific Rise and Guaymas Basin, Gulf of California.

== Research career ==
After completion of her Ph.D., Von Damm spent two years in the laboratory of James Bischoff at the U.S. Geological Survey in Menlo Park, California. As a National Research Council post-doctoral associate, she worked on determining the solubility of quartz in seawater at elevated temperatures and pressures. Her next four years were spent at the Oak Ridge National Laboratory near Knoxville, Tennessee, as a staff geochemist and environmental scientist. During this same time, Von Damm was a Research Associate Professor at the University of Tennessee in Knoxville, researching mid-ocean ridge hydrothermal systems. Von Damm joined the faculty at the University of New Hampshire (UNH) in Durham, New Hampshire, in 1992. She was a professor of geochemistry in the UNH Department of Earth Science and as a researcher at UNH's Institute for the Study of Earth, Oceans and Space.

Von Damm's research is cited as the cornerstone of understanding sea floor hydrothermal systems, specifically for changing pre-existing paradigms for the chemical budget of the ocean, the accretion of oceanic crust along the mid-ocean ridge, the biology of the deep sea, and the origin of life on earth. She made measurements on vent fluids during hundreds of submersible dives in the Pacific, Atlantic, and Indian Oceans. Starting in 1991, Von Damm studied how the fluid chemistry at hydrothermal vents changes with time before, during, and after mid-ocean ridge volcanic eruptions.

== Leadership ==
In the late 1980s, Von Damm was named as an advisor to the National Oceanic and Atmospheric Administration VENTS program. From 1995 to 1998, Von Damm served as Chair of the RIDGE (Ridge Interdisciplinary Global Experiments) Steering Committee, funded by the National Science Foundation’s Ocean Sciences Division. In addition, she served on the National Science Foundation's Geoscience Advisory Board and as chair of a committee to design a 21st-century research submersible for the U.S. science community.

== Awards and honors ==
- 2002 - Fellow of the American Geophysical Union, for unparalleled contributions to exploring and understanding the chemistry of submarine hydrothermal systems, and for her leadership and service to the mid-ocean ridge scientific community.
- 2008 - Fellow of the European Association of Geochemistry
- 2008 - Fellow of the Geochemical Society

== Death ==
Von Damm was diagnosed with liver cancer in April 2008 and died at her home in Durham, New Hampshire, on August 15, 2008, at 53 years of age. Her ashes were spread both on the surface of the Pacific Ocean and also embedded in a glass sphere taken by DSV Alvin on Dive 4464 to rest at P-Vent on the East Pacific Rise, an area Von Damm spent much of her time researching.
