= Godzilla Megamullion =

Oceanic core complex in the Philippine Sea

Coordinates: 16°00′N 139°20′E

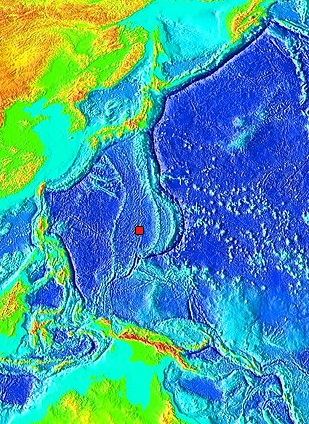
Godzilla Megamullion marked on an elevation map

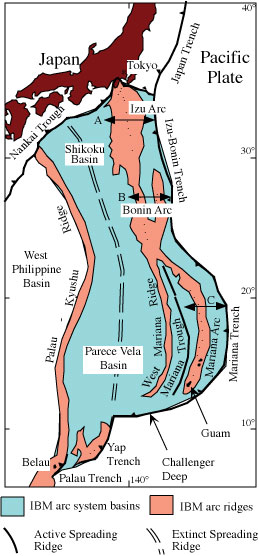
Map of the Izu–Bonin–Mariana Arc system, with the Godzilla Megamullion in the Parece Vela Basin

The Godzilla Megamullion (Japanese: ゴジラ・メガムリオン, romanized: Gojira megamurion) is an undersea Japanese megamullion, or oceanic core complex, 600 kilometres (370 mi) south-east of the island of Okinotorishima in the Philippine Sea. It is about 125 km (78 mi) long by 55 km (34 mi) wide, and is the largest known oceanic core complex in the world. Due to its size it is named after the fictional reptilian movie monster Godzilla, and 14 individual topographic features have been named after Godzilla's body parts.

== Description ==
The Godzilla Megamullion is 600 kilometres (370 mi) to the south-east of Okinotorishima, the southernmost island of Japan. It is part of the Parece Vela Rift in the Philippine Sea, between Japan and the Philippines in the western Pacific Ocean. The megamullion is dome-shaped, and is named after Godzilla as it is the largest known oceanic core complex, measuring approximately 125 by 55 km (78 by 34 mi), more than ten times the size of the next largest known oceanic core complex. It is also the first known megamullion in a back-arc basin, which is unique as most megamullions form on slow-spreading mid-ocean ridges.

Sampling of the megamullion lithology yielded mostly peridotite, gabbroic rocks, leucocratic rocks, and basalt. The gabbroic rocks and peridotite are present throughout the entire length of the megamullion's flow line, indicating that the megamullion is a detachment fault that exposes the uppermost mantle and lower oceanic crust. The megamullion has abundant plagioclase bearing peridotite.

== Discovery and exploration ==
The Godzilla Megamullion was discovered in 2001 as part of the Continental Shelf Surveys Project of the Hydrographic and Oceanographic Department of Japan, and was first described by Yasuhiko Ohara. It was initially named as the "Giant Megamullion". Since 2001 more than 20 expeditions have explored the megamullion. Due to the large size of the megamullion, when describing features it is often divided into distal, medial, and proximal parts. Names describing Godzilla's body parts have also been given to 14 topographic features (south-west to north-east): West Leg Ridge, South Tail Rise, East Leg Ridge, West Hipbone Rise, North Tail Rise, East Hipbone Rise, West Arm Rise, Backbone Rise, East Arm Rise, West Shoulder Ridge, Neck Peak, East Shoulder Ridge, Head Peak, Hat Ridge.

== Naming ==
The Japan Coast Guard helped to name the megamullion, reaching an agreement with Toho, who own the rights to the character Godzilla. Toho's chief Godzilla officer Keiji Ota stated: "I am truly honored that [the megamullion] bears Godzilla's name, the Earth's most powerful monster."

== See also ==
- Geology of the Pacific Ocean
