= Oceanic core complex =

Seabed geologic feature that forms a long ridge perpendicular to a mid-ocean ridge

== Introduction ==
An oceanic core complex, or megamullion, is a geological structure that forms near spreading zones such as mid-ocean ridges. Oceanic core complexes are most commonly found at slow or ultraslow-spreading ridges. They typically feature large, uplifted structures with a corrugated surface and can take on a dome-like shape. These structures can contain rocks such as gabbro or peridotite, which are found in the deep crust and upper mantle, respectively. These deeper rocks become exposed on the seafloor as the hanging wall moves along a detachment fault, progressively exhuming deeper portions of the footwall. This rock exposure is significant because these rocks are normally difficult to access through conventional methods such as drilling, thus providing an unusual opportunity to research the composition and structure of rocks that formed deep within the crust and upper mantle. Their counterparts on land are metamorphic core complexes, which form in areas of continental crustal extension or stretching.

Diagram of a megamullion

== History, distribution and exploration ==
The first oceanic core complexes described were identified in the Atlantic Ocean. Since then numerous such structures have been identified primarily in oceanic lithosphere formed at intermediate, slow- and ultra-slow spreading mid-ocean ridges, as well as back-arc basins. Examples include 10-1000 square km expanses of ocean floor and therefore of the oceanic lithosphere, particularly along the Mid-Atlantic Ridge and the Southwest Indian Ridge. Some of these structures have been drilled and sampled, showing that the footwall can be composed of both mafic plutonic and ultramafic rocks (gabbro and peridotite primarily, in addition to diabase), and a thin shear zone that includes hydrous phyllosilicates. Oceanic core complexes are often associated with active hydrothermal fields.

== Formation ==
Oceanic core complexes form at slow-spreading divergent oceanic plate boundaries. Expansion takes place along low-angle detachment faults. The rate of plate separation varies between different ridge systems; however, magma supply also plays an important role in shaping the seafloor along these ridges. Traditionally, slow-spreading ridges were associated with less magma supply, but more recent research suggests that magma supply is not determined solely by the spreading rate.

There are two primary mechanisms that accommodate extension at spreading ridges: magmatic intrusion and faulting. The relative contribution of each of these mechanisms varies with magma supply. At ridge segments where magma accommodates a lesser proportion of extension, faulting accounts for a greater proportion. When a major normal fault remains active over an extended period of time, it accumulates a substantial amount of displacement and can develop into a long-lived detachment fault. Each detachment fault has three notable features: a breakaway zone where the fault began, an exposed fault surface that rides over the dome, and a termination, which is usually marked by a valley and adjacent ridge. As displacement continues, deeper portions of the footwall that were previously buried beneath the hanging wall become exposed. During this process, the exhumed footwall can then bend and rotate in response to changes in stress and loading associated with continued detachment faulting, thus contributing to the development of elevated massifs characteristic of oceanic core complexes. These massifs can exhibit surface features such as corrugations and even expose rocks from as deep as the lower crust and upper mantle.

== Morphology and Structure ==
Oceanic core complexes typically consist of large, elevated rock masses known as massifs, which can have smooth or corrugated surfaces. These corrugations appear as long ridges and grooves that run parallel to the direction of spreading. Differences in surface appearance can be related to variations in magma supply and tectonic faulting. Greater fault displacement generally produces rougher terrain, while greater magmatic activity tends to produce smoother surfaces. Some massifs can also take on a dome shape as a result of footwall bending and rotation. Their appearance can vary depending on faulting and volcanic activity. Erosion or landslides can also alter their appearance after their formation.

The rocks exposed within oceanic core complexes can include gabbro from the oceanic crust and peridotite from the upper mantle. Other rocks such as serpentinite and igneous dike rocks can also be present. However, the composition of an OCC is not necessarily uniform throughout the structure. These differences can be related to magma supply variations and how the magmatic intrusions are distributed over space and time.

== Life Cycle ==
As tectonic plates separate, normal faulting occurs and the hanging wall moves downward relative to the footwall. Typically, as plate spreading continues, newer faults develop closer to the ridge axis, allowing extension to shift away from the original fault, which eventually becomes inactive. However, during OCC formation, faulting continues along the same fault instead of shifting to newer ones. The longer the fault remains active, the more displacement accumulates along it. The continued relative motion exposes deeper portions of the footwall that were previously buried. In some cases, increased magmatism at the spreading center allows a greater proportion of extension to be accommodated by magma intrusion, rather than continued faulting, which can eventually terminate OCC development. Once development ceases, the fault becomes inactive; however, the resulting OCCs remain.

== Examples ==
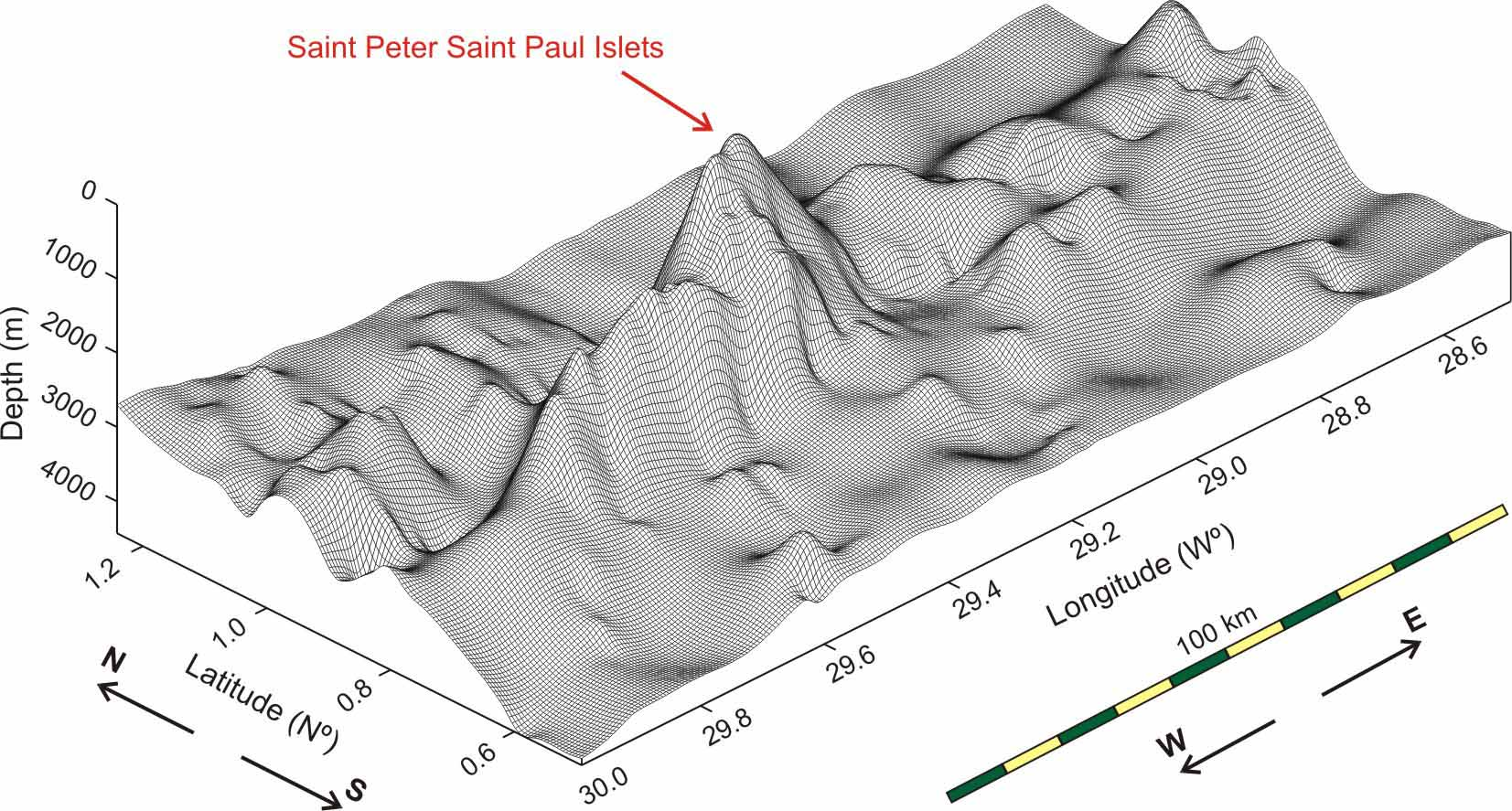
Saint Peter Saint Paul Megamullion, Equatorial Atlantic Ocean

Some 50 oceanic core complexes have been identified, including:

- Godzilla Megamullion, part of the Parece Vela Rift in the Western Pacific Ocean between Japan and the Philippines was discovered in 2001. It is about 155 km long by 55 km across, and is the largest known ocean core complex in the world.
- The Saint Peter and Saint Paul Archipelago and complex lies in the equatorial Atlantic Ocean. It is 90 km long and 4000 m tall. The apex forms the Saint Peter and Paul Rocks. This is one of the few known examples where sea floor mantle rocks are exposed above sea level.

== Research ==
Scientific interest in core complexes has dramatically increased following an expedition in 1996 which mapped the Atlantis Massif. This expedition was the first to associate the complex structures with detachment faults. Research includes:

- To investigate the structure of the mantle:
  The complexes provide cross sections of mantle material which could only otherwise be found by drilling deep into the mantle. The deep drilling that is required to penetrate 6-7 km through the crust is beyond current technical and financial constraints. Selective sample drilling into the complex structures are already underway.
- To investigate the formation of detachment faults
- To investigate the development of oceanic core complexes:
  In 2005 scientists from the Woods Hole Oceanographic Institute discovered a series of complexes in the North Atlantic, 1,500 miles (2,400 km) from Bermuda. These structures are at various stages in their evolution—from bumps that indicated the emergence of a core complex to the faded grooves of long-exhumed core complexes that had been eroded away over millions of years. Such features will enable scientists to see active detachment faults in operation and understand their development.
- To study mineralisation and the release of minerals from the mantle:
  A steeply sloping detachment fault which penetrates deeply can be a conduit for hot mineral-rich hydrothermal fluids to circulate towards the surface and build mineral deposits. These deposits can grow massive because detachment faults persist for hundreds of thousands of years. The Woods Hole Institution is studying one such site, called the TAG hydrothermal field on the Mid-Atlantic Ridge.
- To investigate marine magnetic anomalies:
  The conventional view that marine magnetic anomalies arose in the upper, extrusive layer of the oceanic crust requires a rethink because perfectly normal magnetic anomalies arise at core complexes, where the crust has been stripped away. This suggests that the lower part of the ocean crust contains a substantial magnetic signature.

== See also ==
- Metamorphic core complex
