= Atlantis Massif =

Underwater geologic feature in the North Atlantic Ocean

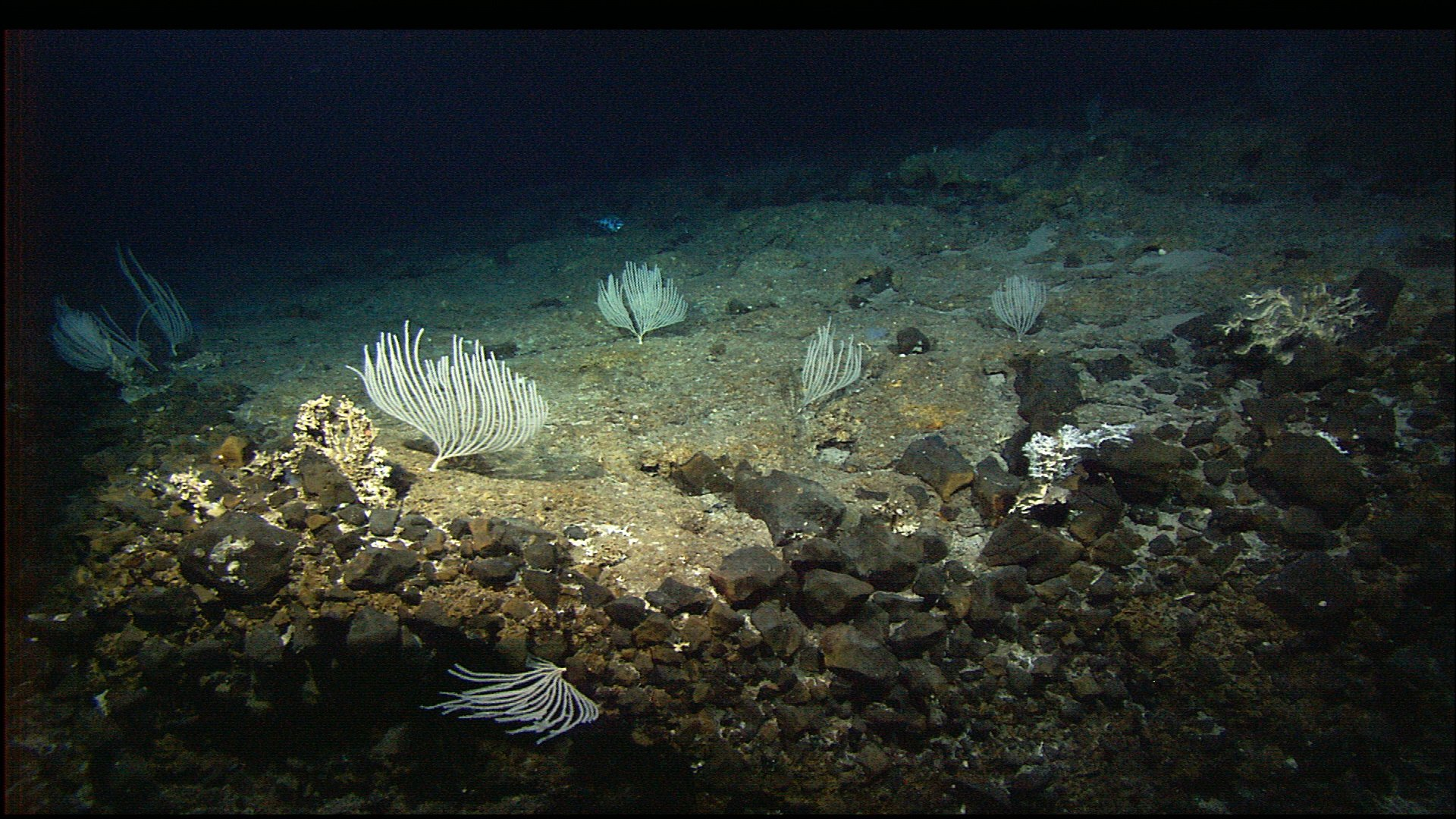
- The seafloor of the Atlantis Massif, showing white corals and an apparent spotted fish

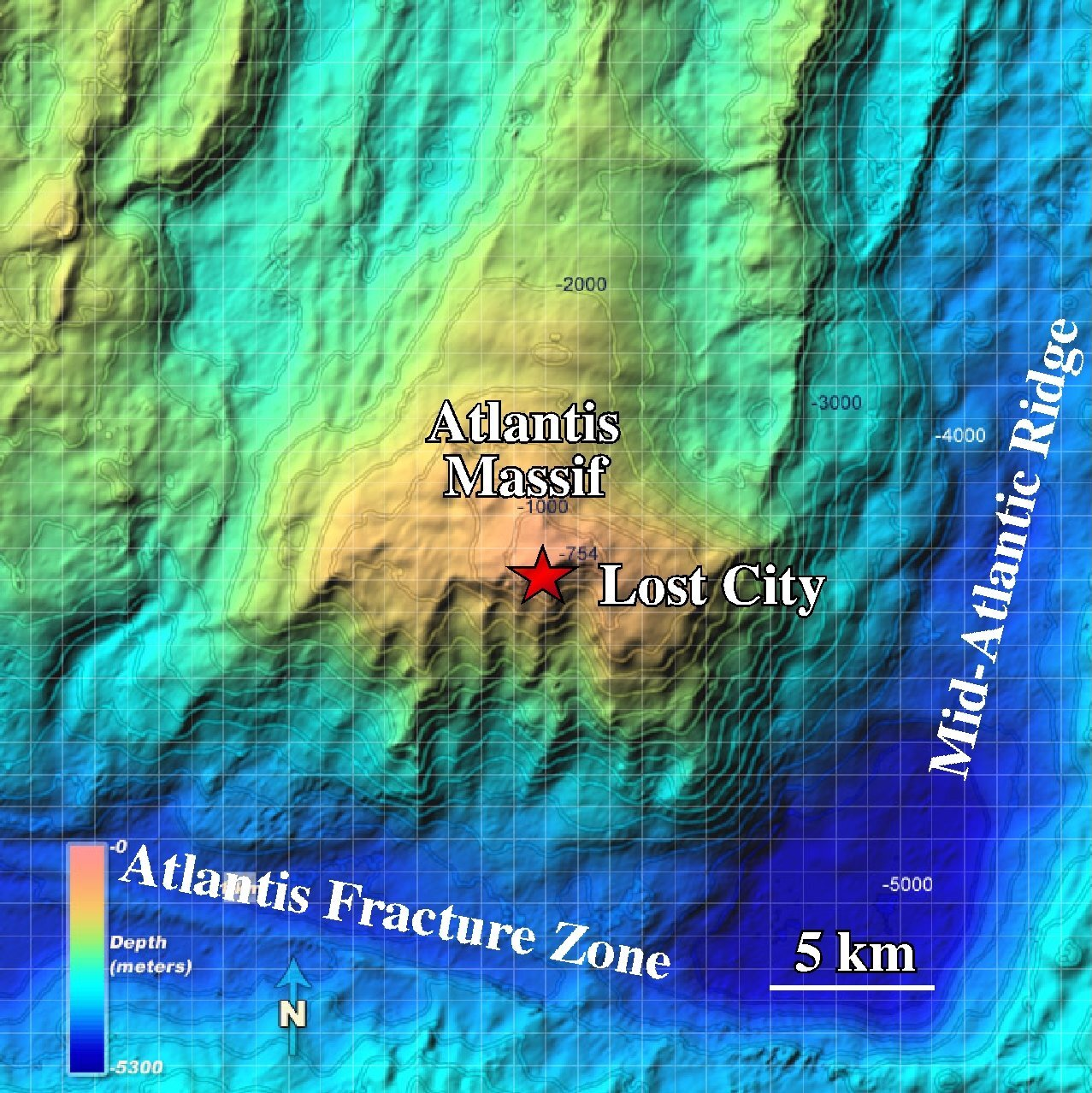
- Undersea topography of the Atlantis Massif highlighting the location of the Lost City Hydrothermal Field
- Summit depth: 700 metres (2,297 ft)
- Height: 14,000 feet (4,267 m)

Location
- Location: North Atlantic Ocean
- Coordinates: 30.13°N 42.13°W

Geology
- Type: Oceanic core complex
- Volcanic arc/chain: Lost City Hydrothermal Field
- Age of rock: Early Pleistocene; ~2-1.5 Ma

The Atlantis Massif is a prominent undersea massif in the North Atlantic Ocean. It is a dome-shaped region approximately 10 miles (16 km) across and rising about 14,000 feet (4,267 m) from the sea floor. It is located at approximately 30°8′N latitude 42°8′W longitude; just east of the intersection of the Mid-Atlantic Ridge with the Atlantis Transform Fault. The highest point of the massif is around 700 metres (2,297 ft) beneath the surface.

== Description ==
It is believed that the massif was formed underneath the nearby Mid-Atlantic Ridge but was pulled from under the ridge during the movement of the plates, about 1.5 to 2 million years ago. Geologic studies of the massif have indicated that it is not composed of the black basalt typical of the ocean floor but rather of dense green peridotite, which is usually found in the mantle. The central dome is corrugated and striated in a way that is representative of an exposed ultramafic oceanic core complex.

An expedition to the area in 1996 made an important advance in the study of the ocean floor. It found that a steeply sloping detachment fault is associated with the oceanic core complex structure. The dome was caused by mantle material being extruded to the surface. Another expedition discovered the Lost City hydrothermal field near the summit of the ridge in 2000.

Another expedition in 2016, the IODP 357 expedition, targeted this massif, drilling cores.
