= Haiti =

Country in the Caribbean

Republic of Haiti: République d'Haïti (French); Repiblik Ayiti (Haitian Creole)
- Flag Coat of arms
- Motto: Liberté, égalité, fraternité (French); Libète, egalite, fratènite (Haitian Creole); "Liberty, equality, fraternity"
- Anthem: La Dessalinienne "The Dessaline"
- Capital and largest city: Port-au-Prince; 18°32′10″N 72°20′47″W
- Official languages: French; Haitian Creole
- Ethnic groups: 95% African; 5% other
- Religion (2020): 87.0% Christianity; 10.7% no religion; 2.1% Haitian Vodou; 0.2% other
- Demonym: Haitian
- Government: Semi-presidential republic (de jure)
  - President: Vacant
  - Prime Minister: Alix Didier Fils-Aimé (acting)
- Legislature: National Assembly (vacant)
  - Upper house: Senate
  - Lower house: Chamber of Deputies

Independence from France
  - Independence declared: 1 January 1804
  - Independence recognized: 17 April 1825
  - First Empire: 22 September 1804
  - Southern Republic: 17 October 1806
  - Northern State: 17 October 1806
  - Kingdom: 28 March 1811
  - Unification of Hispaniola: 9 February 1822
  - Dissolution: 27 February 1844
  - Second Empire: 26 August 1849
  - Republic: 15 January 1859
  - United States occupation: 28 July 1915 – 1 August 1934
  - Independence from the United States: 15 August 1934
  - Current constitution: 20 June 2012

Area
  - Total: 27,700 km^{2} (10,700 sq mi) (143rd)
  - Water (%): 0.7

Population
  - 2025 estimate: ▲11,906,096 (83rd)
  - Density: 417/km^{2} (1,080.0/sq mi) (32nd)
- GDP (PPP): 2025 estimate
  - Total: ▲$38.200 billion (144th)
  - Per capita: ▲$3,040 (169th)
- GDP (nominal): 2025 estimate
  - Total: ▲$33.550 billion (107th)
  - Per capita: ▲$2,670 (141st)
- Gini (2023): ▼41 medium inequality
- HDI (2023): ▲0.554 medium (166th)
- Currency: Gourde (G) (HTG)
- Time zone: UTC−05:00 (EST)
  - Summer (DST): UTC−04:00 (EDT)
- Calling code: +509
- ISO 3166 code: HT
- Internet TLD: .ht

Haiti, (Note: /ˈheɪti/ HAY-tee; French: Haïti [a.iti]; Haitian Creole: Ayiti [a.ji.ti]) officially the Republic of Haiti, (Note: French: République d'Haïti; Haitian Creole: Repiblik Ayiti) (Note: The nation was officially founded as Hayti in its Declaration of Independence and early prints, constitutions, and imperial declarations. Published writings of 1802–1919 in the United States commonly used the name Hayti (e.g. The Blue Book of Hayti (1919), a book with official standing in Haiti). By 1873 Haiti was common among titles of US published books as well as in US congressional publications. In all of Frederick Douglass' publications after 1890, he used Haiti. As late as 1949, the name Hayti continued to be used in books published in England (e.g. Hayti: 145 Years of Independence—The Bi-Centenary of Port-au-Prince published in London, England in 1949) but by 1950, usage in England had shifted to Haiti.) is a country in the Caribbean on the island of Hispaniola in the Caribbean Sea, east of Cuba and Jamaica and south of the Bahamas. It occupies the western side of the island, which it shares with the Dominican Republic. Haiti is the third largest country in the Caribbean by area, and with an estimated population of 11.4 million, it is the most populous Caribbean country. The capital and largest city is Port-au-Prince.

Haiti was originally inhabited by Indigenous peoples, known as the Taíno. In 1492, Christopher Columbus established the first European settlement in the Americas, La Navidad, on its northeastern coast. The island was part of the Spanish Empire until 1697, when the western portion was ceded to France and became Saint-Domingue, a French colony based on sugarcane plantations worked by enslaved Africans. The 1791–1804 Haitian Revolution made Haiti the first sovereign state in the Caribbean, the second republic in the Americas, the first country in the Americas to officially abolish slavery, and the only country in history established by a slave revolt. The independent state began as an empire, later splitting into two nations before reunifying in 1820; a second empire was established under Faustin Soulouque before the return of the republic in 1859. The 19th century saw political instability, international isolation, a crippling debt to France, and failed invasions of the Dominican Republic, including a costly war as well. U.S. forces occupied Haiti from 1915 to 1934, followed by the dictatorial rule of the Duvalier family (1957–1986). Following a coup d'état in 1991, a U.S.-led multinational force intervened in 1994; a second coup in 2004 was followed by a United Nations intervention. In the 2010s, a catastrophic earthquake and a large-scale cholera outbreak devastated the country.

Historically poor and politically unstable, Haiti has faced severe economic and political crises, gang activity displacing over 1.3 million, and the collapse of its government. The presidency has been vacant since the assassination of Jovenel Moïse in July 2021, while the National Assembly and the judiciary have been rendered inoperative, leaving the country in virtual anarchy with almost nonexistent state control. It is one of the world's least developed countries and is the only country in the Americas classified as such. With no elected officials remaining, Haiti has been described as a failed state.

Haiti is a founding member of the United Nations, Organization of American States, Association of Caribbean States, and the Organisation internationale de la Francophonie. In addition to CARICOM, it is a member of the International Monetary Fund, World Trade Organization, and Community of Latin American and Caribbean States.

== Etymology ==
Haiti (also earlier Hayti) comes from the Indigenous Taíno language and means "land of high mountains"; it was the Native name (Note: The Taínos may have used Bohío as another name for the island.) for the entire island of Hispaniola. The name was restored by Haitian revolutionary Jean-Jacques Dessalines as the official name of independent Saint-Domingue, as a tribute to the Amerindian predecessors. Another theory on the name Haiti is its origin in African tradition; in Fon language, one of the most spoken by the bossales (Haitians born in Africa), Ayiti-Tomè means: "From nowadays this land is our land."

In French, the ï in Haïti has a diacritical mark, a diaeresis (used to show that the second vowel is pronounced separately, as in the word naïve), while the H is silent. (In English, this rule for the pronunciation is often disregarded, thus the spelling Haiti is used.) There are different anglicizations for its pronunciation such as HIGH-ti, high-EE-ti and haa-EE-ti, which are still in use, but HAY-ti is the most widespread and best-established. In French, Haiti's nickname is La Perle des Antilles ("Pearl of the Antilles") because of both its natural beauty and the amount of wealth it accumulated for the Kingdom of France. In Haitian Creole, it is spelled and pronounced with a y but no H: Ayiti. In the Haitian community the country has multiple nicknames: Ayiti-Toma (as its origin in Ayiti Tomè), Ayiti-Cheri (Ayiti my Darling), Tè-Desalin (Dessalines' Land) or Lakay (Home).

== History ==
=== Pre-Columbian era ===
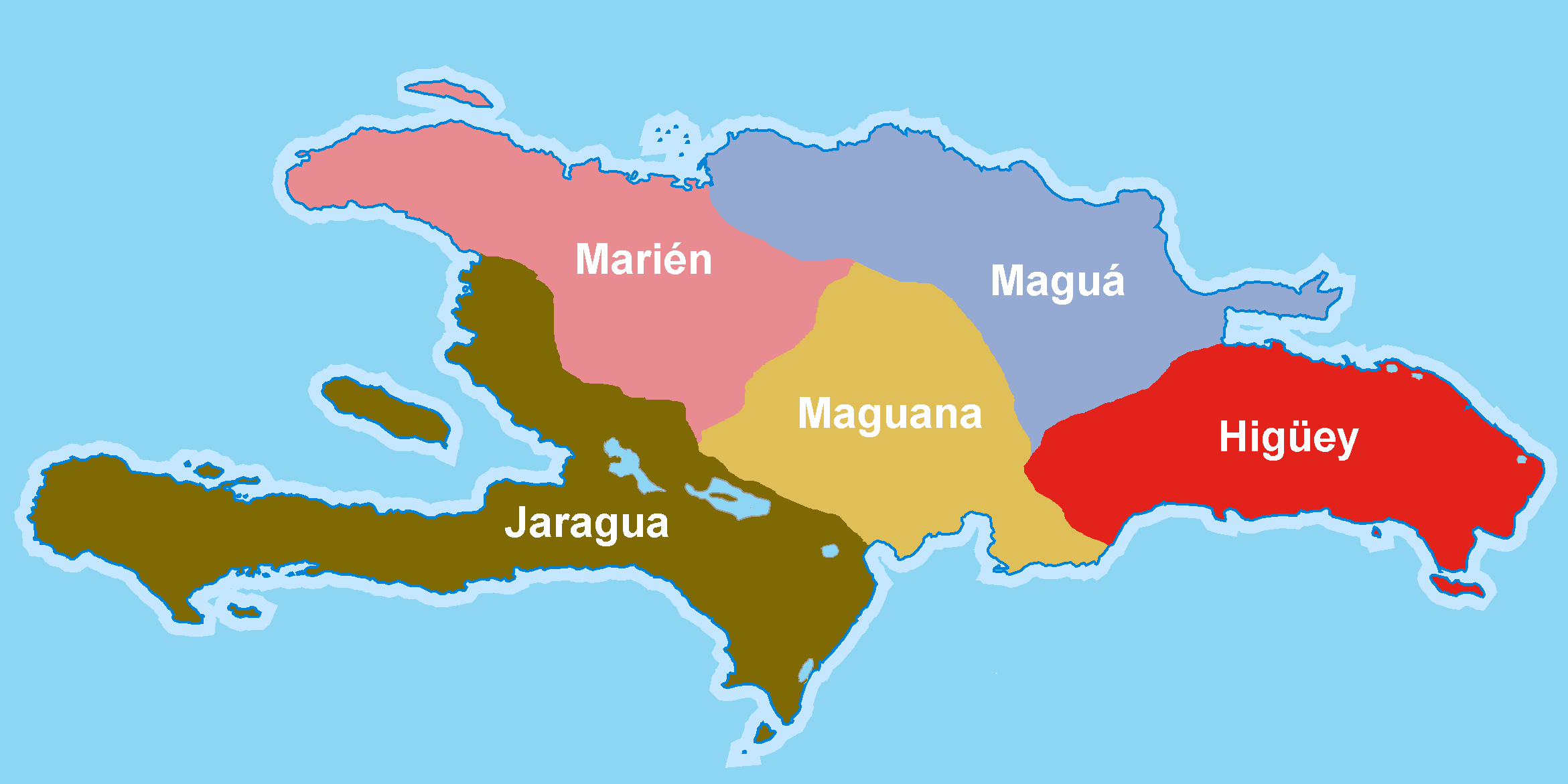
The five caciquedoms of Hispaniola at the time of the arrival of Christopher Columbus

The island of Hispaniola, of which Haiti occupies the western three-eighths, has been inhabited since about 6,000 years ago by Indigenous peoples who are thought to have arrived from Central or northern South America. These Archaic Age people are thought to have been largely hunter-gatherers. During the 1st millennium BC, the Arawakan-speaking ancestors of the Taino people began to migrate into the Caribbean. Unlike the Archaic peoples, they practiced the intensive production of pottery and agriculture. The earliest evidence of the ancestors of the Taino people on Hispaniola is the Ostionoid culture, which dates to around 600 AD.

In Taíno society the largest unit of political organization was led by a cacique, or chief, as the Europeans understood them. At the time of European contact, Hispaniola was divided among five 'caciquedoms': the Magua in the northeast, the Marien in the northwest, the Jaragua in the southwest, the Maguana in the central regions of Cibao, and the Higüey in the southeast.

Taíno cultural artifacts include cave paintings in several locations in the country. These have become national symbols of Haiti and tourist attractions. Modern-day Léogâne, started as a French colonial town in the southwest, is beside the former capital of the caciquedom of Xaraguá.

According to the Puerto Rican historian Cayetano Coll y Toste, the German explorer Carl Friedrich Philipp von Martius was the first person to describe the Indigenous peoples of Haiti as "Taini" (Taino). The archaeologist L. Antonio Curet has written that Martius described these peoples as "Taini...perhaps by mistaking the qualifier for an ethnonym".

=== Colonial era ===
==== Spanish rule (1492–1625) ====
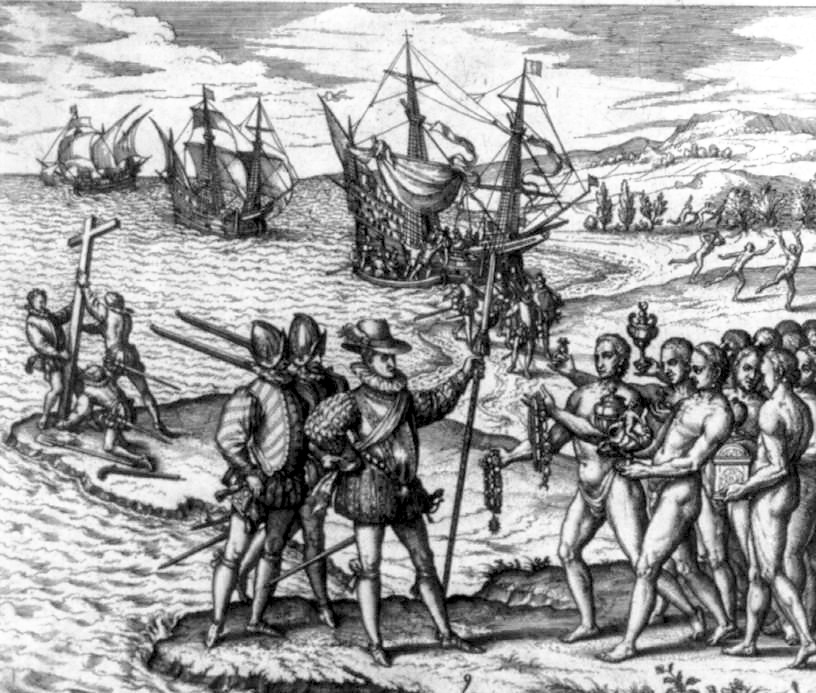
Artist's impression of Christopher Columbus landing on Hispaniola, engraving by Theodor de Bry

Navigator Christopher Columbus landed in Haiti on 6 December 1492, in an area that he named Môle-Saint-Nicolas, and claimed the island for the Crown of Castile. On 25 December his ship the Santa María ran aground near the present site of Cap-Haïtien. Columbus left 39 men on the island, who founded the settlement of La Navidad. Relations with the native peoples were initially good; however the settlers were later killed by the Taíno.

The sailors carried endemic Eurasian infectious diseases, causing epidemics that killed a large number of native people. The first recorded smallpox epidemic in the Americas erupted on Hispaniola in 1507. Their numbers were further reduced by the harshness of the encomienda system, in which the Spanish forced natives to work in gold mines and plantations. The Spanish passed the Laws of Burgos (1512–1513) which forbade the maltreatment of natives, endorsed their conversion to Catholicism, and gave legal framework to encomiendas. The natives were brought to these sites to work in specific plantations or industries.

As the Spanish re-focused their colonization efforts on the greater riches of mainland Central and South America, Hispaniola became reduced largely to a trading and refueling post. As a result piracy became widespread, encouraged by European powers hostile to Spain such as France (based on Île de la Tortue) and England. The Spanish largely abandoned the western third of the island, focusing their colonization effort on the eastern two-thirds. The western part of the island was thus gradually settled by French buccaneers; among them was Bertrand d'Ogeron, who succeeded in growing tobacco and recruited many French colonial families from Martinique and Guadeloupe. In 1697 France and Spain settled their hostilities on the island by way of the Treaty of Ryswick of 1697, which divided Hispaniola between them.

==== French rule (1625–1804) ====
France received the western third and subsequently named it Saint-Domingue, the French equivalent of Santo Domingo, the Spanish colony on Hispaniola. The French set about creating sugar and coffee plantations, worked by vast numbers of those enslaved imported from Africa, and Saint-Domingue grew to become their richest colonial possession, generating 40% of France’s foreign trade and doubling the wealth generation of all of England’s colonies, combined.

The French settlers were outnumbered by enslaved persons by almost 10 to 1. According to the 1788 census, Haiti's population consisted of nearly 25,000 Europeans, 22,000 free coloreds and 700,000 Africans in slavery. In the north of the island, those enslaved were able to retain many ties to African cultures, religion and language; these ties were continually being renewed by newly imported Africans. Some West Africans in slavery held on to their traditional Vodou beliefs by secretly syncretizing it with Catholicism.

The French enacted the Code Noir ("Black Code"), prepared by Jean-Baptiste Colbert and ratified by Louis XIV, which established rules on slave treatment and permissible freedoms. Saint-Domingue has been described as one of the most brutally efficient slave colonies; at the end of the 18th century it was supplying two-thirds of Europe's tropical produce while one-third of newly imported Africans died within a few years. Many enslaved persons died from diseases such as smallpox and typhoid fever. They had low birth rates, and there is evidence that some women aborted fetuses rather than give birth to children within the bonds of slavery. The colony's environment also suffered, as forests were cleared to make way for plantations and the land was overworked so as to extract maximum profit for French plantation owners.

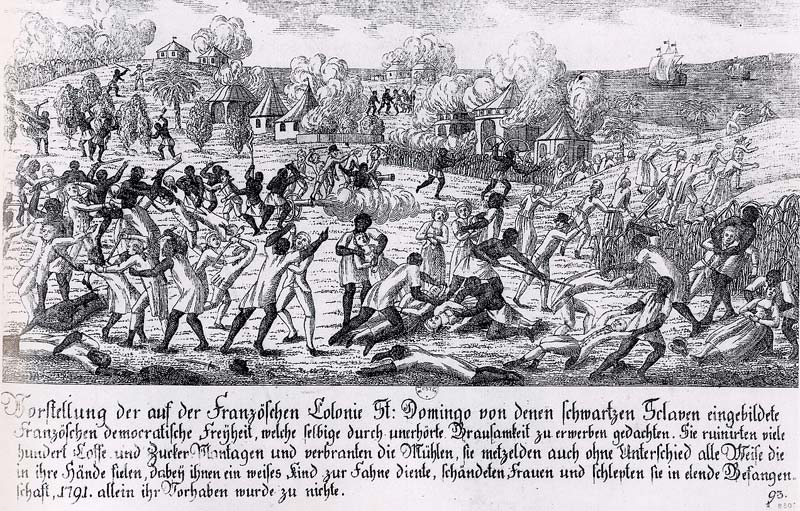
Saint-Domingue slave revolt in 1791

As in its Louisiana colony, the French colonial government allowed some rights to free people of color (gens de couleur), the mixed-race descendants of European male colonists and African enslaved females (and later, mixed-race women). Over time, many were released from slavery, and they established a separate social class. White French Creole fathers frequently sent their mixed-race sons to France for their education. Some men of color were admitted into the military. More of the free people of color lived in the south of the island, near Port-au-Prince, and many intermarried within their community. They frequently worked as artisans and tradesmen and began to own some property, including enslaved persons of their own. The free people of color petitioned the colonial government to expand their rights.

The brutality of slave life led many people in bondage to escape to mountainous regions, where they set up their own autonomous communities and became known as maroons. One maroon leader, François Mackandal, led a rebellion in the 1750s; however, he was later captured and executed by the French.

==== Haitian Revolution (1791–1804) ====
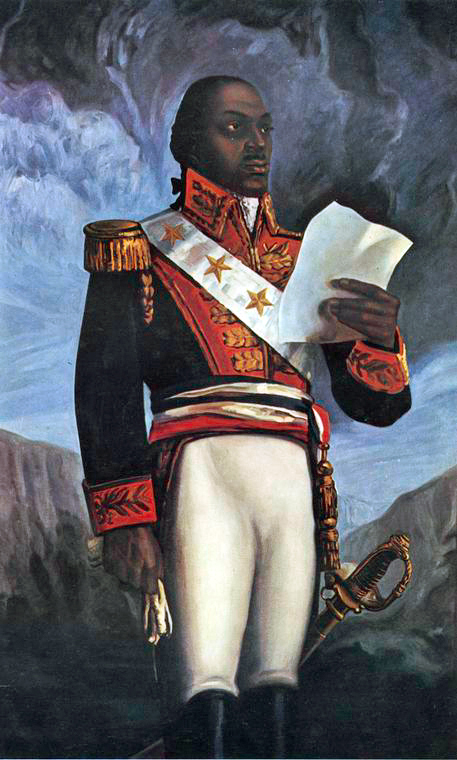
General Toussaint Louverture

Inspired by the French Revolution of 1789 and principles of the rights of man, the French settlers and free people of color pressed for greater political freedom and more civil rights. Tensions between these two groups led to conflict, and a militia of free-coloreds was set up in 1790 by Vincent Ogé, resulting in his capture, torture and execution. Sensing an opportunity, in August 1791 the first slave armies were established in northern Haiti under the leadership of Toussaint Louverture inspired by the Vodou houngan (priest) Boukman, and backed by the Spanish in Santo Domingo – soon a full-blown slave rebellion had broken out across the entire colony.

In 1792, the French First Republic sent three commissioners with troops to re-establish control. To build an alliance with the gens de couleur and enslaved persons, commissioners Léger-Félicité Sonthonax and Étienne Polverel abolished slavery in the colony. Six months later, the National Convention endorsed abolition and extended it to all the French colonies.

The United States oscillated between supporting or not supporting Louverture and the emerging country of Haiti, depending on who was President of the US. George Washington, who was a slave holder and isolationist, kept the United States neutral, although private US citizens at times provided aid to French planters trying to put down the revolt. John Adams, a vocal opponent of both slavery and Revolutionary France, fully supported the slave revolt by providing diplomatic recognition, financial support, munitions and warships (including the USS Constitution) beginning in 1798. This support ended in 1801 when Thomas Jefferson, another slave-holding president, took office and recalled the US Navy.

With slavery abolished, Louverture pledged allegiance to France, and he fought off the British and Spanish forces who had taken advantage of the situation and had invaded Saint-Domingue. The Spanish were later forced to cede their part of the island to France under the terms of the Peace of Basel in 1795, uniting the island under one government. However, an insurgency against French rule broke out in the east, and in the west there was fighting between Louverture's forces and the free people of color led by André Rigaud in the War of the Knives (1799–1800). The United States' support for the blacks in the war contributed to their victory over the mulattoes. More than 25,000 whites and free blacks left the island as refugees.

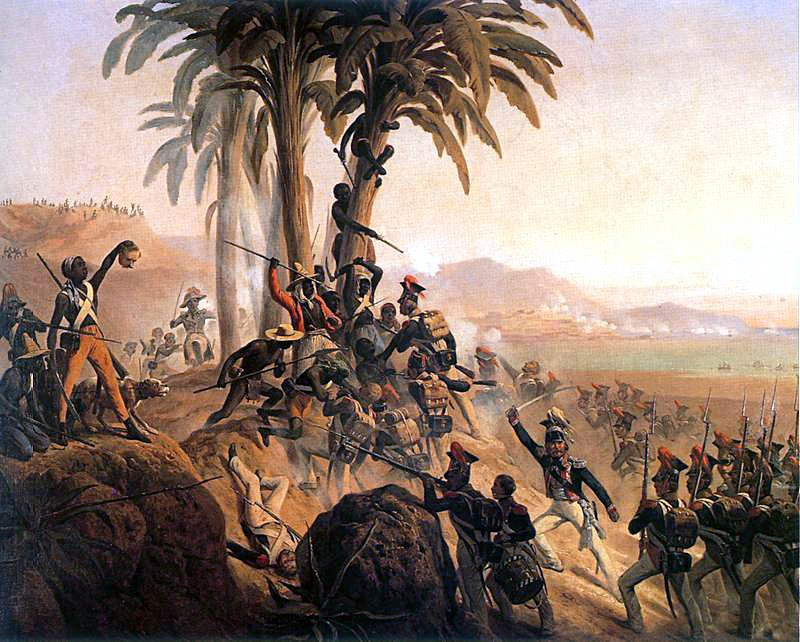
Battle between Polish troops in French service and the Haitian rebels. The majority of Polish soldiers eventually deserted the French army and fought alongside the Haitians.

After Louverture created a separatist constitution and proclaimed himself governor-general for life, Napoléon Bonaparte in 1802 sent an expedition of 20,000 soldiers and as many sailors under the command of his brother-in-law Charles Leclerc to reassert French control. The French achieved some victories, but within a few months most of their army had died from yellow fever. Ultimately more than 50,000 French troops died in an attempt to retake the colony, including 18 generals. The French managed to capture Louverture, transporting him to France for trial. He was imprisoned at Fort de Joux, where he died in 1803 of exposure and possibly tuberculosis.

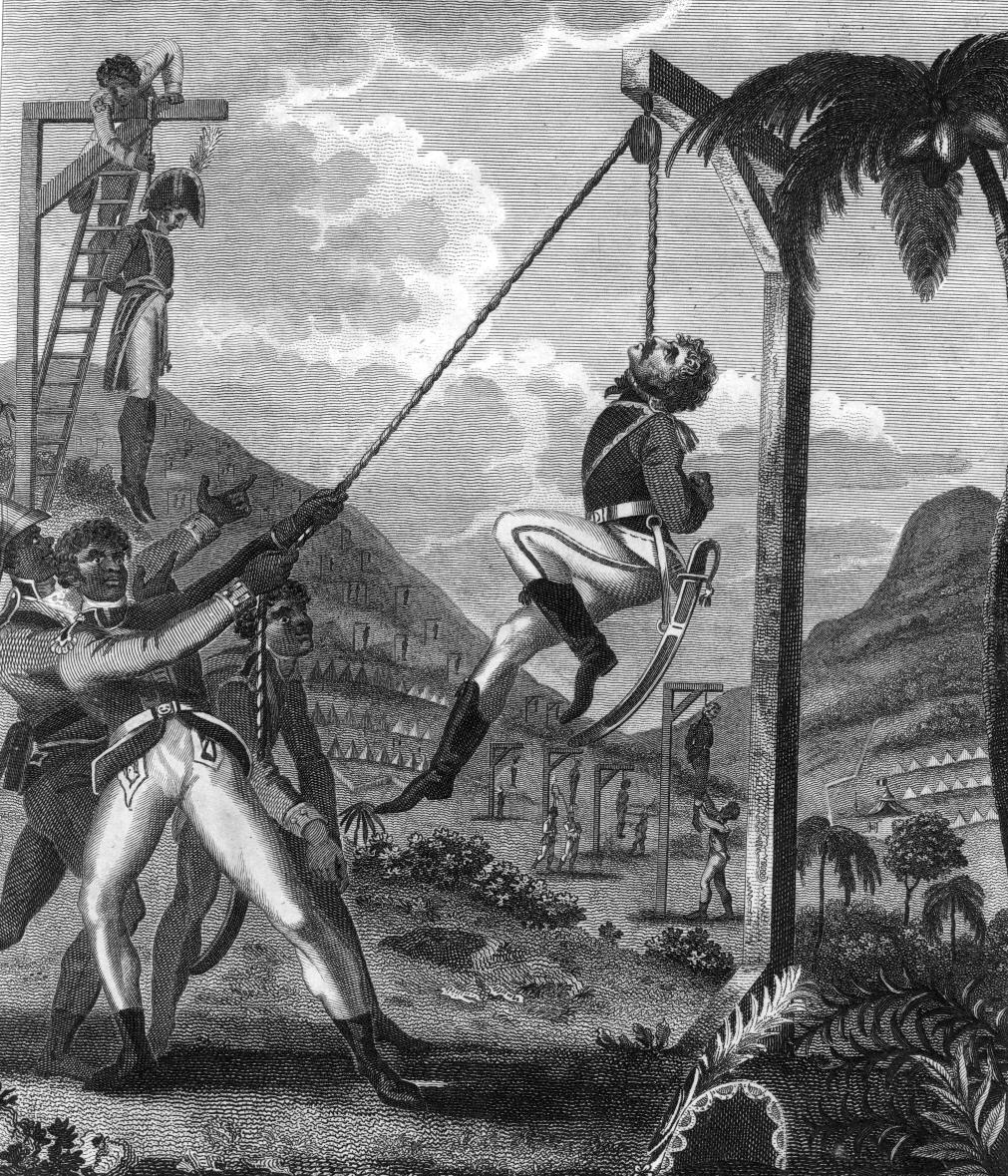
Haitians hanging French soldiers

The enslaved persons, along with free gens de couleur and allies, continued their fight for independence, led by generals Jean-Jacques Dessalines, Alexandre Pétion and Henry Christophe. The rebels finally managed to decisively defeat the French troops at the Battle of Vertières on 18 November 1803, establishing the only state to successfully gain independence through a slave revolt. Under the overall command of Dessalines, the Haitian armies avoided open battle and instead conducted a successful guerrilla campaign against the Napoleonic forces, working with diseases such as yellow fever to reduce the numbers of French soldiers. Later that year France withdrew its remaining 7,000 troops from the island, and Napoleon gave up his idea of re-establishing a North American empire, selling Louisiana (New France) to the United States in the Louisiana Purchase. On 1 January 1804, the leaders of the Haitian Revolution declared their achieved independence from France.

Throughout the revolution, an estimated 20,000 French troops succumbed to yellow fever, while another 37,000 were killed in action, exceeding the total French soldiers killed in action across various 19th-century colonial campaigns in Algeria, Mexico, Indochina, Tunisia, and West Africa, which resulted in approximately 10,000 French soldiers killed in action combined. The British sustained 45,000 dead. Additionally, 200,000 Haitians died. In the process, Dessalines became arguably the most successful military commander in the struggle against Napoleonic France.

=== Independent Haiti ===
==== First Empire (1804–1806) ====
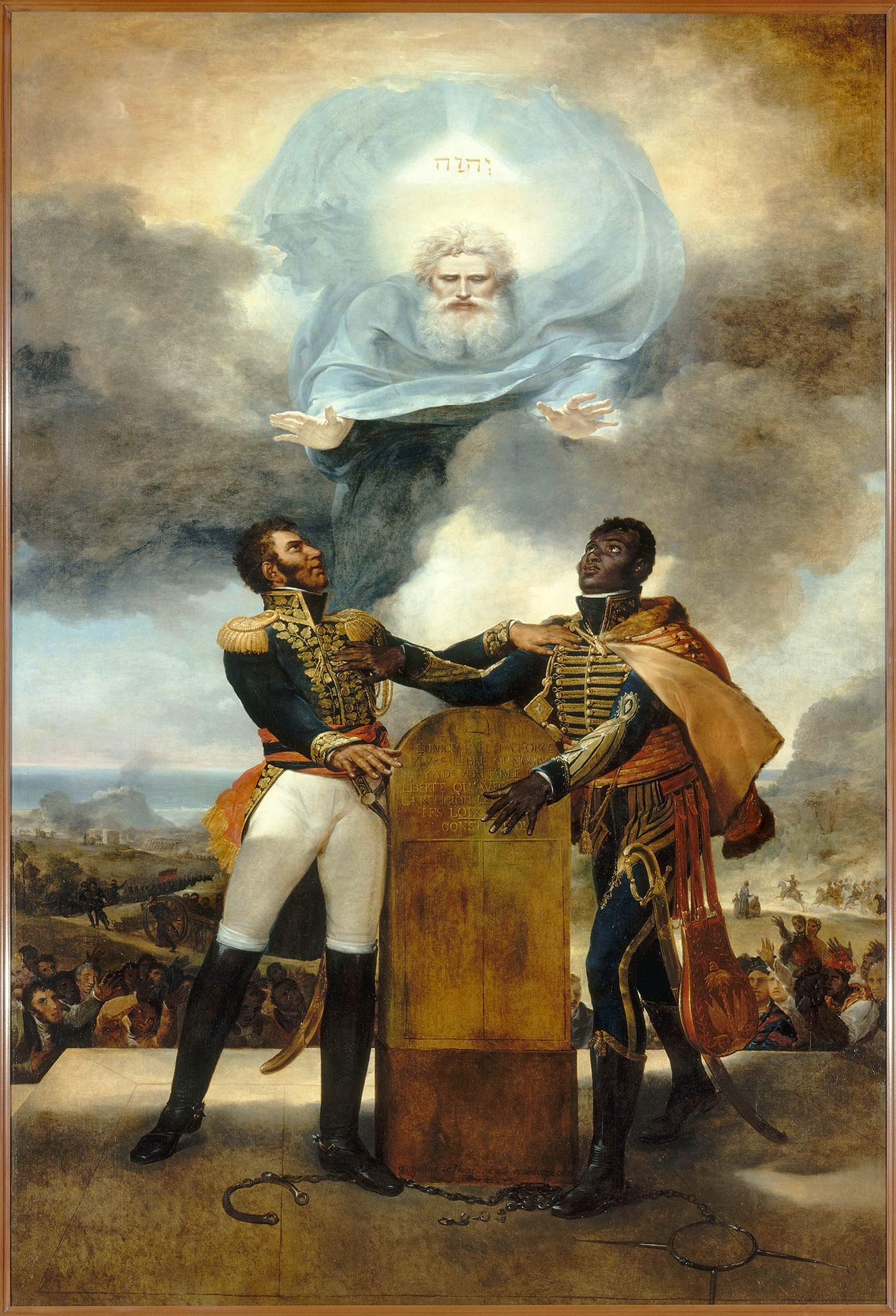
Pétion and Dessalines swearing allegiance to each other before God; painting by Guillon-Lethière

The independence of Saint-Domingue was proclaimed under the native name 'Haiti' by Dessalines on 1 January 1804 in Gonaïves, and he was proclaimed "Emperor for Life" as Emperor Jacques I by his troops. Dessalines at first offered protection to the white planters and others. However, once in power, he ordered the 1804 Haitian massacre of nearly all the remaining whites; between January and April 1804, 3,000 to 5,000 whites were killed, including those who had been friendly and sympathetic to the black population. Only three categories of white people were selected out as exceptions and spared: Polish soldiers, some of whom had deserted from the French army and fought alongside the Haitian rebels; a small group of German colonists invited to the north-west region; and a group of medical doctors and professionals. Reportedly, people with connections to officers in the Haitian army were also spared, as well as the women who agreed to marry non-white men.

Fearful of the potential impact the slave rebellion could have in the slave states, U.S. President Jefferson refused to recognize the new republic. The Southern politicians who were a powerful voting bloc in the American Congress prevented U.S. recognition for decades until they withdrew in 1861 to form the Confederacy. The revolution led to a wave of emigration. In 1809, 9,000 refugees from Saint-Domingue, both white planters and people of color, settled en masse in New Orleans, doubling the city's population, having been expelled from their initial refuge in Cuba by Spanish authorities.

The plantation system was re-established in Haiti, albeit for wages; however, many Haitians were marginalized and resented the heavy-handed manner in which this was enforced in the new nation's politics. The rebel movement splintered, and Dessalines was assassinated by rivals on 17 October 1806.

==== State of Haiti, Kingdom of Haiti and the Republic (1806–1820) ====
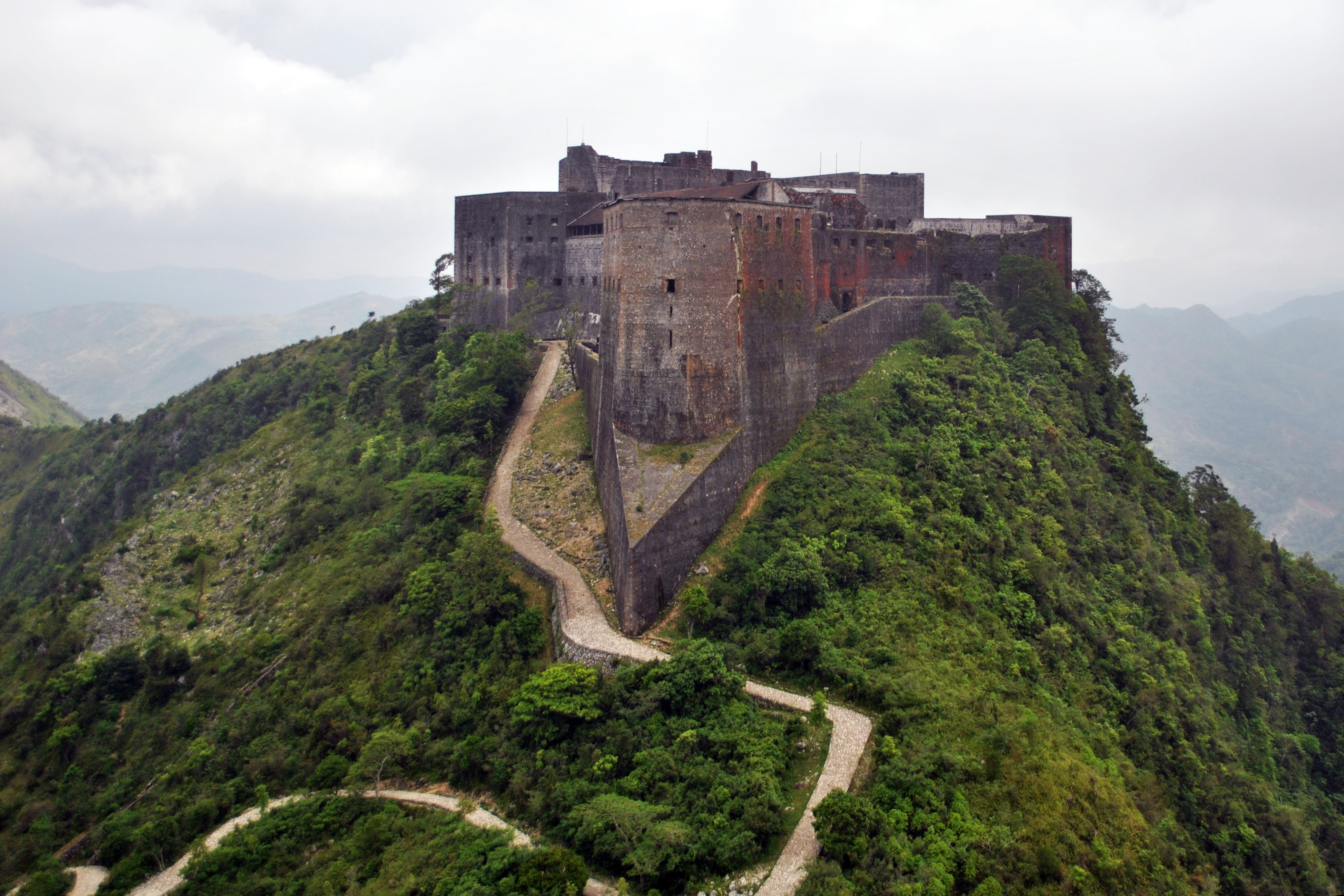
Citadelle Laferrière, built 1805–1822, is the largest fortress in the Americas, and is considered locally to be an eighth wonder of the world.

After Dessalines' death, Haiti became split into two, with the Kingdom of Haiti in the north directed by Henri Christophe, later declaring himself Henri I, and a republic in the south centered on Port-au-Prince, directed by Alexandre Pétion, an homme de couleur. Pétion's republic was less absolutist, and he initiated a series of land reforms which benefited the peasant class. Pétion also gave military and financial assistance to the revolutionary leader Simón Bolívar, which were critical in enabling him to liberate the Viceroyalty of New Granada. Meanwhile, the French, who had managed to maintain a precarious control of eastern Hispaniola, were defeated by insurgents led by Juan Sánchez Ramírez, with the area returning to Spanish rule in 1809 following the Battle of Palo Hincado.

==== Unification of Hispaniola (1821–1844) ====
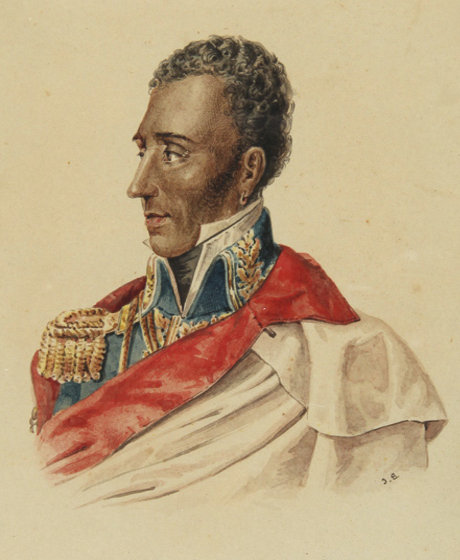
Jean-Pierre Boyer (r. 1818–1843)

Beginning in 1821, President Jean-Pierre Boyer, also an homme de couleur and successor to Pétion, reunified the island following the suicide of Christophe. After Santo Domingo declared its independence from Spain on 30 November 1821, Boyer invaded, seeking to unite the entire island by force and to end slavery in Santo Domingo. Struggling to revive the agricultural economy to produce commodity crops, Boyer passed the Code Rural, which denied peasant laborers the right to leave the land, enter the towns, or start farms or shops of their own, causing much resentment as most peasants wished to have their own farms rather than work on plantations. Boyer's administration also reserved the highest posts in the administrative bureaucracy for Haitian mulattoes, contributing to resentment among Dominicans.

Starting in 1824, more than 6,000 African Americans migrated to Haiti, with transportation paid by an American philanthropic group similar in function to the American Colonization Society and its efforts in Liberia. Many found the conditions too harsh and returned to the United States.

In July 1825, King Charles X of France, during a period of restoration of the French monarchy, sent a fleet to reconquer Haiti. Under pressure, Boyer agreed to a treaty by which France formally recognized the independence of the state in exchange for a payment of 150 million francs, or $560 million in today's dollars. By an order of 17 April 1826, the King of France renounced his rights of sovereignty and formally recognized the independence of Haiti. The enforced payments to France hampered Haiti's economic growth for years, exacerbated by the fact that many Western states continued to refuse formal diplomatic recognition to Haiti; Britain recognized Haitian independence in 1833, and the United States not until 1862. Haiti borrowed heavily from Western banks at extremely high interest rates to repay the debt, an amount estimated to be between $21 billion and $115 billion in lost economic growth over time, or as much as eight times the size of Haiti's economy in 2020. Although the amount of the reparations was reduced to $90 million in 1838, by 1900 80% of Haiti's government spending was debt repayment, and the country did not finish repaying it until 1947.

==== Loss of the eastern portion of the island ====
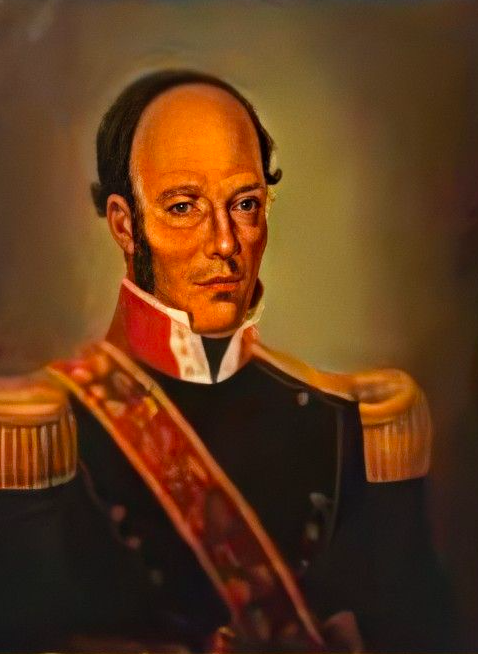
Charles Rivière-Hérard (r. 1843–1844)

After losing the support of Haiti's elite, Boyer was ousted in 1843, with Charles Rivière-Hérard replacing him as president. Nationalist Dominican forces in eastern Hispaniola seized control of Santo Domingo on 27 February 1844. The Haitian forces, unprepared for a significant uprising, capitulated to the rebels, effectively ending Haitian rule of eastern Hispaniola. In March, Rivière-Hérard attempted to reimpose his authority, but the Dominicans inflicted heavy losses. Rivière-Hérard was removed from office by the mulatto hierarchy and replaced with the aged general Philippe Guerrier, who assumed the presidency on 3 May 1844.

Guerrier died in April 1845 and was succeeded by General Jean-Louis Pierrot. Pierrot's most pressing duty was to check the incursions of the Dominicans, who were harassing the Haitian troops. Dominican gunboats were also making depredations on Haiti's coasts. President Pierrot decided to open a campaign against the Dominicans, whom he considered merely as insurgents; however, the Haitian offensive of 1845 was stopped on the frontier.

On 1 January 1846, Pierrot announced a fresh campaign to reimpose Haitian suzerainty over eastern Hispaniola, but his officers and men greeted this fresh summons with contempt. Thus, a month later – February 1846 – when Pierrot ordered his troops to march against the Dominicans, the Haitian army mutinied, and its soldiers proclaimed his overthrow as president of the republic. With the war against the Dominicans having become very unpopular in Haiti, it was beyond the power of the new president, General Jean-Baptiste Riché, to stage another invasion.

==== Second Empire (1849–1859) ====
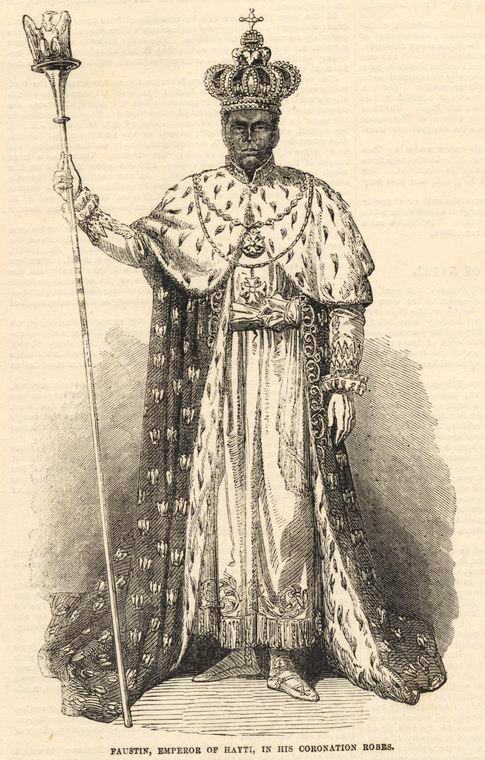
Faustin I, from The Illustrated London News, 16 February 1856

On 27 February 1847, Riché died after only a year in power and was replaced by an obscure officer, General Faustin Soulouque. During the first two years of Soulouque's administration the conspiracies and opposition he faced in retaining power were so manifold that the Dominicans were given a further breathing space in which to consolidate their independence. But, when in 1848 France finally recognized the Dominican Republic as a free and independent state and provisionally signed a treaty of peace, friendship, commerce and navigation, Haiti immediately protested, claiming the treaty was an attack upon their own security. Soulouque decided to invade the new Republic before the French Government could ratify the treaty.

On 21 March 1849, Haitian soldiers attacked the Dominican garrison at Las Matas, which offered almost no resistance before abandoning its weapons. Soulouque pressed on, capturing San Juan, leaving only the town of Azua as the remaining Dominican stronghold between the Haitian army and the capital. On 6 April, Azua fell to the 18,000-strong Haitian army, with a 5,000-man Dominican counterattack failing to oust them. According to the Haitian account, the way to Santo Domingo was now clear, but the news of discontent existing at Port-au-Prince, which reached Soulouque, halted his advance and caused him to return with the army to his capital.

Emboldened by the sudden retreat of the Haitian army, the Dominicans counter-attacked; their flotilla went as far as Dame-Marie on the Tiburon Peninsula, which they plundered and set on fire. After another Haitian campaign in 1855, Britain and France intervened and obtained an armistice on behalf of the Dominicans, who declared independence as the Dominican Republic.

The sufferings endured by the soldiers during the campaign of 1855, and the losses and sacrifices inflicted on the country without yielding any compensation or any practical results provoked great discontent. In 1858 a revolution began, led by General Fabre Geffrard. In December of that year, Geffrard defeated the army and seized control of most of the country. As a result, Soulouque abdicated his throne on 15 January 1859 and was taken into exile, and Geffrard succeeded him as president.

==== Late 19th century–early 20th century ====
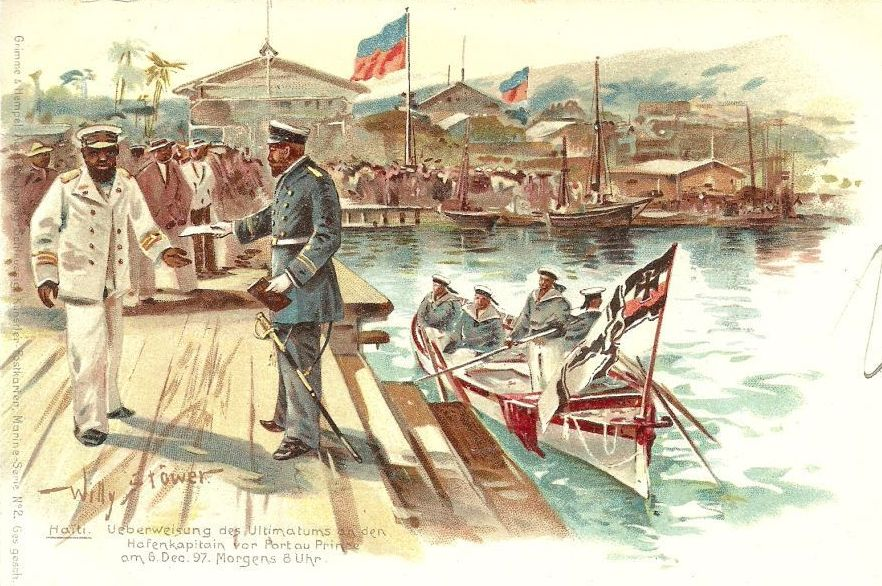
German captain August Carl Thiele delivering the German ultimatum during the 1897 Lüders affair

The period following Soulouque's overthrow down to the turn of the century was a turbulent one for Haiti, with repeated bouts of political instability. Geffrard was overthrown in a coup in 1867, as was his successor, Sylvain Salnave, in 1869. Under the Presidency of Michel Domingue (1874–1876) relations with the Dominican Republic were dramatically improved by the signing of a treaty, in which both parties acknowledged the independence of the other. Some modernisation of the economy and infrastructure also occurred in this period, especially under the presidencies of Lysius Salomon (1879–1888) and Florvil Hyppolite (1889–1896).

Haiti's relations with outside powers were often strained. In 1889 the United States attempted to force Haiti to permit the building of a naval base at Môle Saint-Nicolas, which was firmly resisted by President Hyppolite. In 1892 the German government supported suppression of the reform movement of Anténor Firmin, and in 1897 the Germans used gunboat diplomacy to intimidate and then humiliate the Haitian government of President Tirésias Simon Sam (1896–1902) during the Lüders affair.

In the first decades of the 20th century, Haiti experienced great political instability and was heavily in debt to France, Germany and the United States. A series of short lived presidencies came and went: Pierre Nord Alexis was forced from power in 1908, as was his successor François C. Antoine Simon in 1911; Cincinnatus Leconte (1911–1912) was killed in a (possibly deliberate) explosion at the National Palace; Michel Oreste (1913–1914) was ousted in a coup, as was his successor Oreste Zamor in 1914.

==== United States occupation (1915–1934) ====
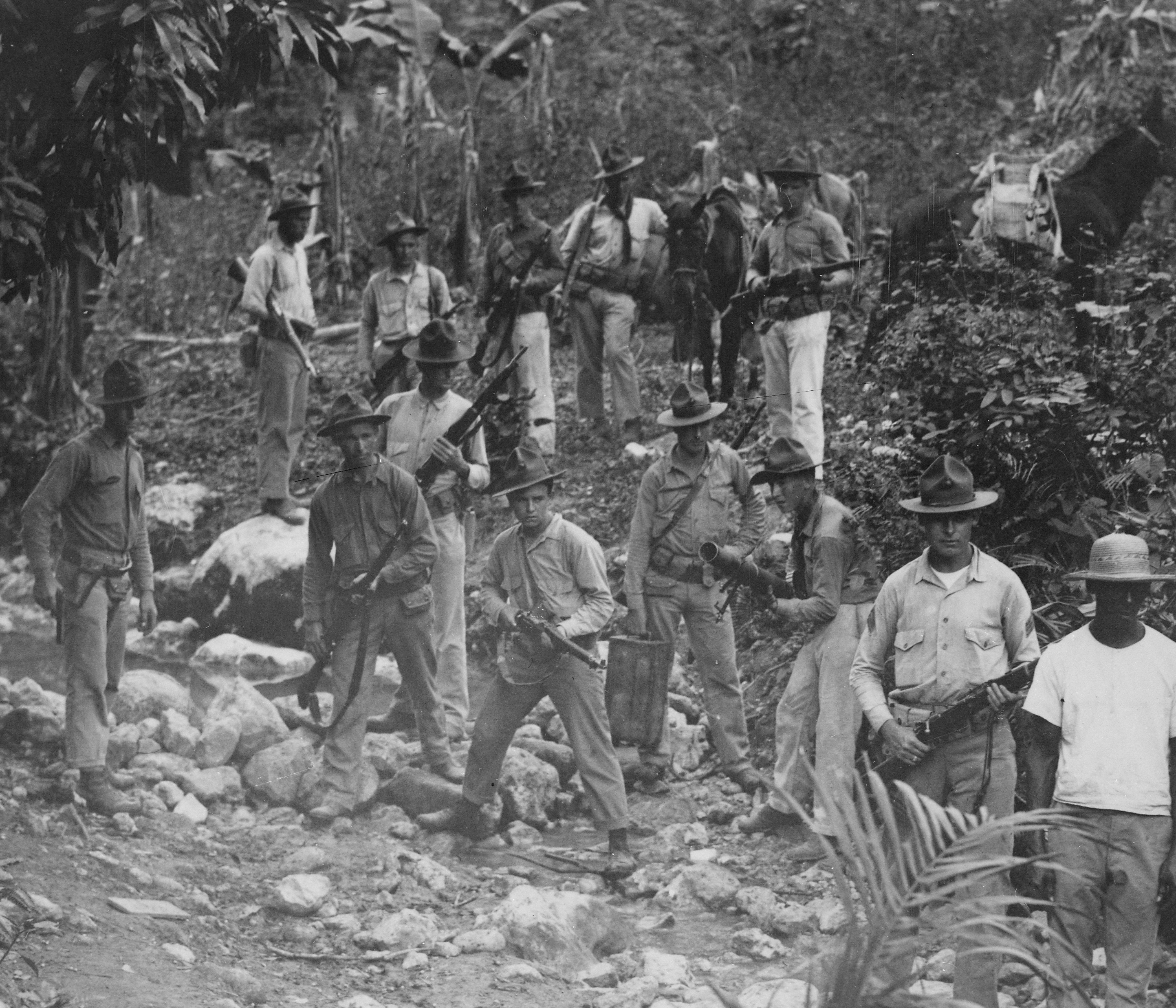
U.S. Marines and guide in search of Haitian Cacos fighters against the U.S. occupation of Haiti, c. 1919

Germany increased its influence in Haiti in this period, with a small community of German settlers wielding disproportionate influence in Haiti's economy. The German influence prompted anxieties in the United States, who had also invested heavily in the country and who defended their right to oppose foreign interference in the Americas under the Monroe Doctrine. In December 1914 the Americans removed $500,000 from the Haitian National Bank, but rather than seize it to help pay the debt, it was removed for safe-keeping in New York, thus giving the United States control of the bank and preventing other powers from doing so.

In 1915, Haiti President Vilbrun Guillaume Sam sought to strengthen his tenuous rule by a mass execution of 167 political prisoners. Outrage at the killings led to riots, and Sam was captured and killed by a lynch mob. Fearing possible foreign intervention or the emergence of a government led by the anti-American Haitian politician Rosalvo Bobo, President Woodrow Wilson sent U.S. Marines into Haiti in July 1915. The USS Washington, under Rear Admiral Caperton, arrived in Port-au-Prince in an attempt to restore order and protect U.S. interests. Within days, the Marines had taken control of the capital city and its banks and customs house. The Marines declared martial law and severely censored the press. Within weeks, pro-U.S. Haitian President Philippe Sudré Dartiguenave was installed, and a new constitution was written that was favorable to the interests of the United States. The constitution (written by future US President Franklin D. Roosevelt) included a clause that allowed, for the first time, foreign ownership of land in Haiti, which was bitterly opposed by the Haitian legislature and citizenry.

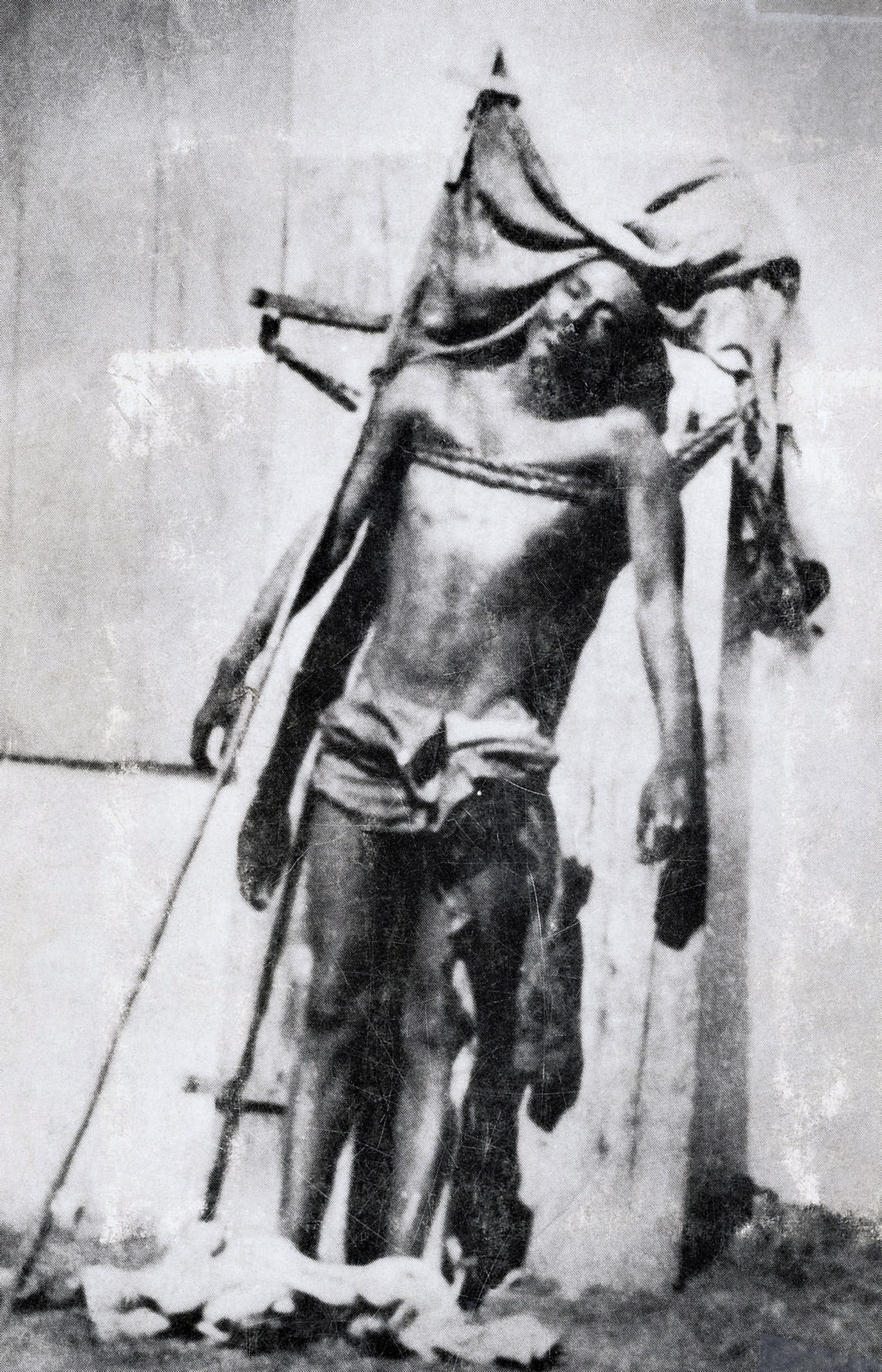
The body of caco leader Charlemagne Péralte on display after his execution by US forces; the image was counterproductive, with the resemblance to the deposition of Jesus gaining Péralte the status of national martyr.

The occupation improved some of Haiti's infrastructure and centralized power in Port-au-Prince. 1700 km of roads were made usable, 189 bridges were built, many irrigation canals were rehabilitated, hospitals, schools, and public buildings were constructed, and drinking water was brought to the main cities. Agricultural education was organized, with a central school of agriculture and 69 farms in the country. However, many infrastructure projects were built using the corvée system that allowed the government/occupying forces to take people from their homes and farms, at gunpoint if necessary, to build infrastructure by force, a process that was deeply resented by ordinary Haitians. Sisal was also introduced to Haiti, and sugarcane and cotton became significant exports, boosting prosperity. Haitian traditionalists based in rural areas were highly resistant to U.S.-backed changes, while the urban elites, typically mixed-race, welcomed the growing economy but wanted more political control. Together they helped secure an end to the occupation in 1934, under the Presidency of Sténio Vincent. The debts were still outstanding, though less due to increased prosperity, and the U.S. financial advisor-general receiver handled the budget until 1941.

The U.S. Marines were instilled with a special brand of paternalism towards Haitians "expressed in the metaphor of a father's relationship with his children." Armed opposition to the US presence was led by the Cacos under the command of Charlemagne Péralte; his capture and execution in 1919 earned him the status of a national martyr. During US Senate hearings in 1921, the commandant of the Marine Corps reported that in the 20 months of active unrest, 2,250 Haitians had been killed. However, in a report to the Secretary of the Navy, he reported the death toll as 3,250. Haitian historians have claimed the true number was much higher, but this is not supported by most historians outside Haiti.

==== Post-occupation era (1934–1957) ====
After U.S. forces left in 1934, Dominican dictator Rafael Trujillo used anti-Haitian sentiment as a nationalist tool. In 1937, in an event that became known as the Parsley Massacre, he ordered his army to kill Haitians living on the Dominican side of the border. Few bullets were used; instead, 20,000–30,000 Haitians were bludgeoned and bayoneted, then herded into the sea, where sharks finished what Trujillo had begun. The indiscriminate massacre occurred over a period of five days and involved hundreds of Dominican troops.

Haitian President Sténio Vincent, under US pressure owing to his increasingly dictatorial actions, resigned in 1941 and was replaced by Élie Lescot. In December 1941, during the Second World War, Lescot declared war on Japan, Germany, Italy, Bulgaria, Hungary, and Romania. Out of these six Axis powers, only Romania reciprocated. On 27 September 1945, Haiti became a founding member of the United Nations (the successor to the League of Nations, of which Haiti was also a founding member).

In 1946, Lescot was overthrown by the military, with Dumarsais Estimé becoming president. Estimé sought to improve the economy and education, and to boost the role of black Haitians; however, as he sought to consolidate his rule he too was overthrown in a coup led by Paul Magloire, who replaced him in 1950. Firmly anti-Communist, he was supported by the United States; with greater political stability tourists started to visit Haiti. The waterfront area of Port-au-Prince was redeveloped to allow cruise ship passengers to walk to cultural attractions.

==== Duvalier dynasty (1957–1986) ====
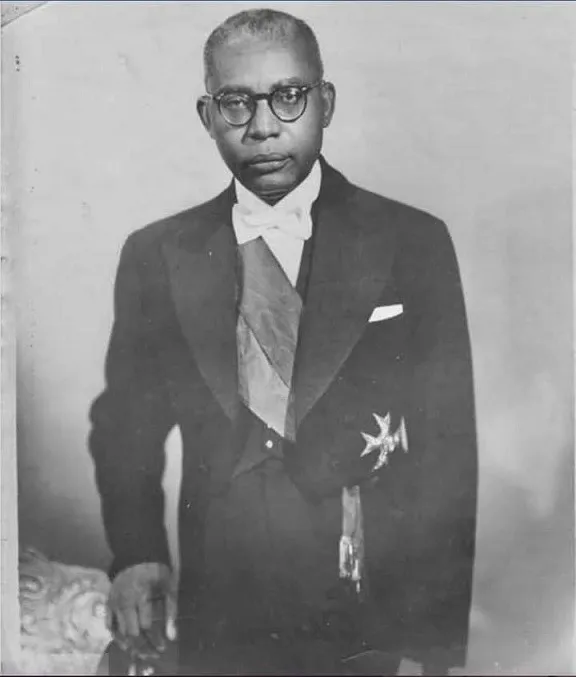
François Duvalier ("Papa Doc") after being elected in 1957

In 1956–57, Haiti underwent severe political turmoil; Magloire was forced to resign and leave the country in 1956, and he was followed by four short-lived presidencies. In the September 1957 election, François Duvalier was elected president. Known as 'Papa Doc' and initially popular, Duvalier remained president until his death in 1971. He advanced black interests in the public sector, where over time people of color had predominated as the educated urban elite. Not trusting the army despite his frequent purges of officers deemed disloyal, Duvalier created a private militia known as Tontons Macoutes ("Bogeymen"), which maintained order by terrorizing the populace and political opponents. In 1964, Duvalier proclaimed himself 'President for Life'; an uprising against his rule that year in Jérémie was violently suppressed, with the ringleaders publicly executed and hundreds of mixed-raced citizens in the town killed. The bulk of the educated and professional class began leaving the country, and corruption became widespread. Duvalier sought to create a personality cult, identifying himself with Baron Samedi, one of the loa (or lwa), or spirits, of Haitian Vodou. Despite the well-publicized abuses under his rule, Duvalier's firm anti-communist stance earned him the support of the United States, who furnished the country with aid.

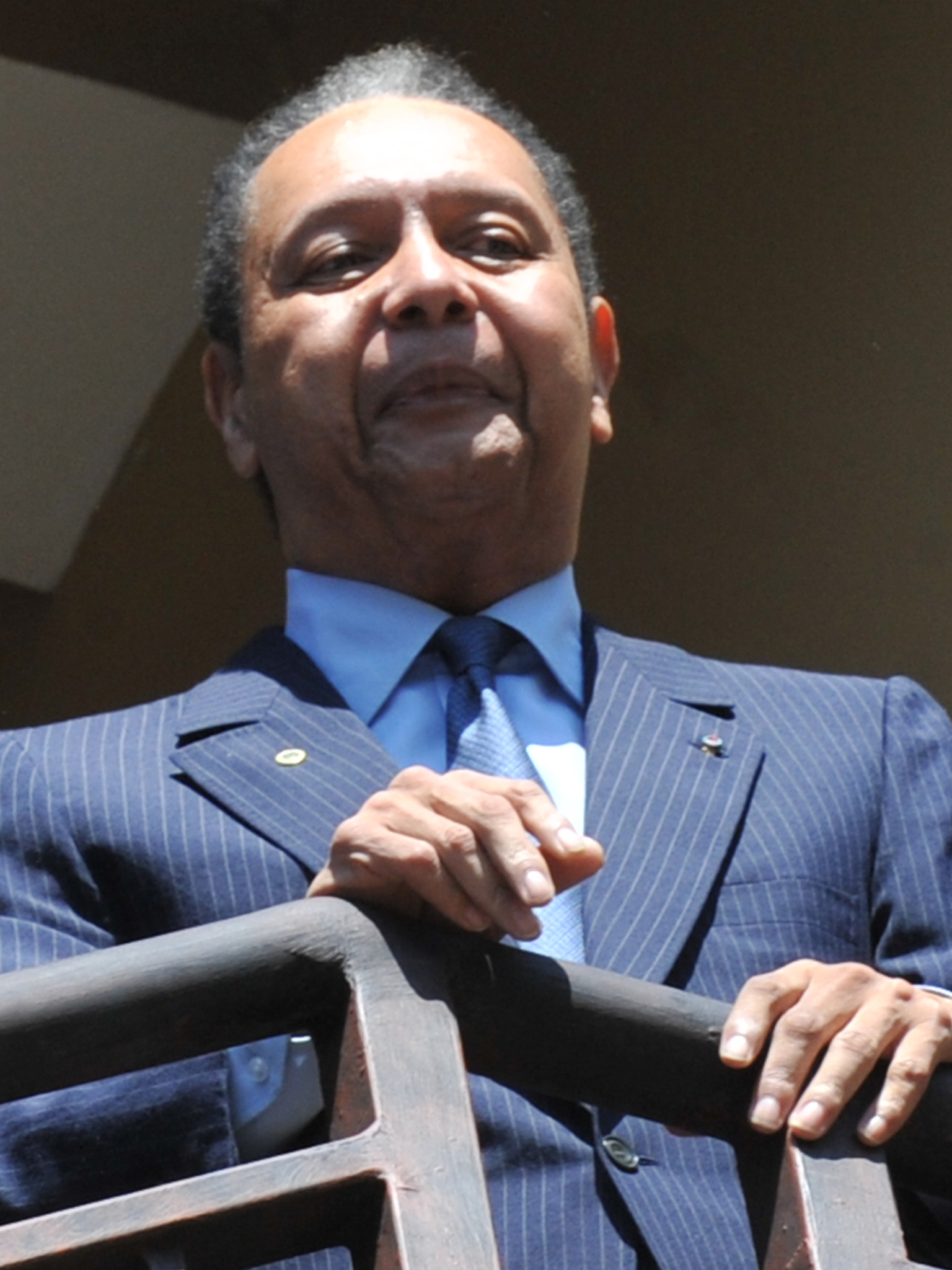
Jean-Claude Duvalier ("Baby Doc") in 2011

In 1971 Duvalier died, and he was succeeded by his son Jean-Claude Duvalier, nicknamed 'Baby Doc', who ruled until 1986. He largely continued his father's policies, though he curbed some of the worst excesses in order to court international respectability. Tourism, which had nosedived in Papa Doc's time, again became a growing industry. However, as the economy continued to decline, Baby Doc's grip on power began to weaken. Haiti's pig population was slaughtered following an outbreak of swine fever in the late 1970s, causing hardship to rural communities who used them as an investment. The opposition became more vocal, bolstered by a visit to the country by Pope John Paul II in 1983, who publicly lambasted the president. Demonstrations occurred in Gonaïves in 1985 which then spread across the country; under pressure from the United States, Duvalier left the country in February 1986.

In total, roughly 40,000 to 60,000 Haitians are estimated to have been killed during the reign of the Duvaliers. Through the use of repression and executions, many educated Haitians had fled or went into exile, leaving the country with a massive brain drain problem from which it has yet to recover.

==== Post-Duvalier era (1986–2004) ====
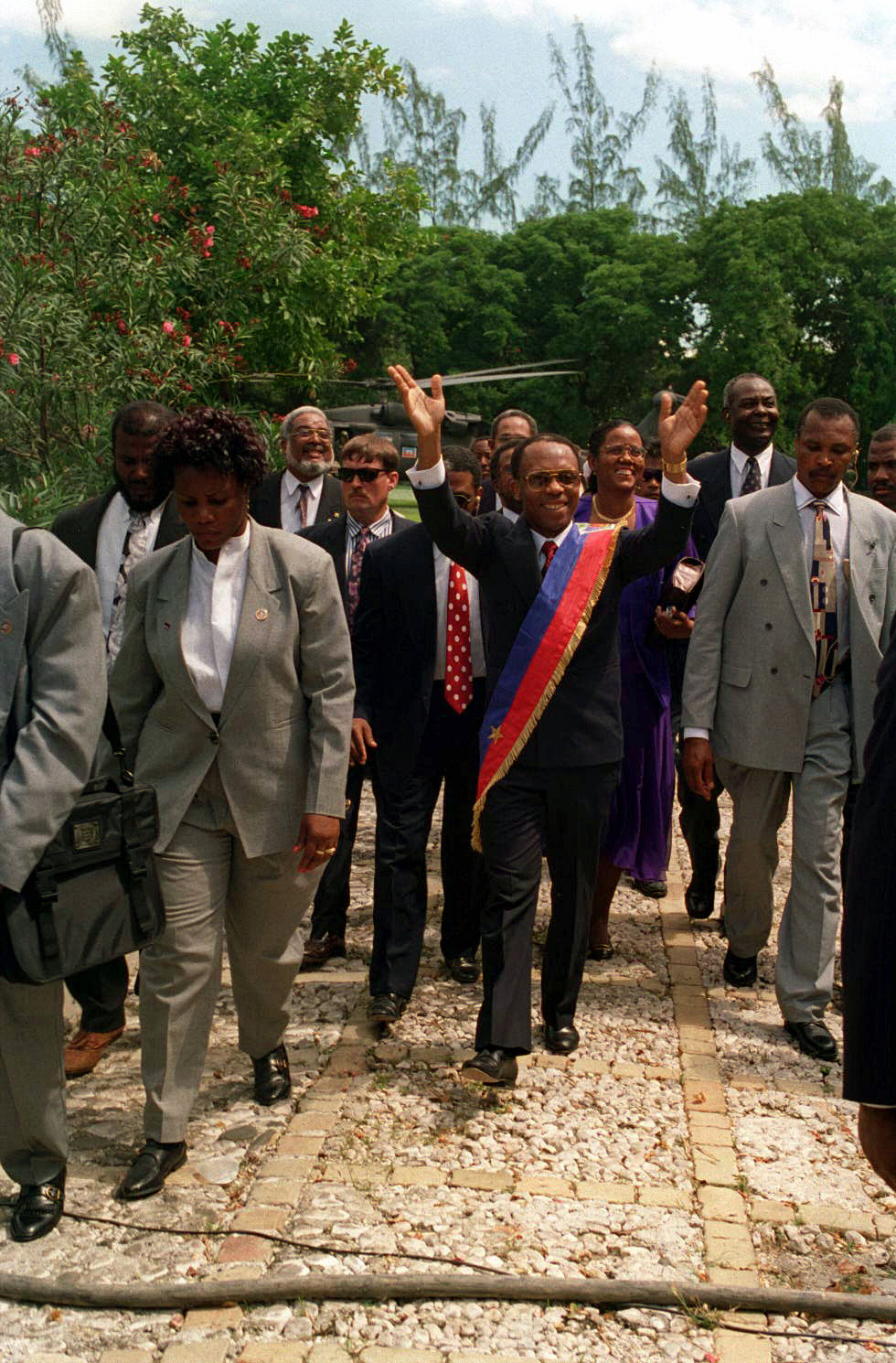
Jean-Bertrand Aristide returns to Haiti following the U.S.-led invasion in 1994 designed to remove the regime installed by the 1991 Haitian coup d'état

Following Duvalier's departure, army leader General Henri Namphy headed the National Governing Council. Elections scheduled for November 1987 were aborted after dozens of inhabitants were shot in the capital by soldiers and Tontons Macoutes. Fraudulent elections followed in 1988, in which only 4% of the citizenry voted. The newly elected president, Leslie Manigat, was then overthrown some months later in the June 1988 Haitian coup d'état.

Another coup followed in September 1988, after the St. Jean Bosco massacre in which approximately 13 to 50 people were killed while attending a mass led by prominent government critic and Catholic priest Jean-Bertrand Aristide. General Prosper Avril subsequently led a military regime until March 1990. Avril transferred power to the army chief of staff General Hérard Abraham on 10 March. Abraham gave up power three days later, becoming the only military leader in Haiti during the 20th century to voluntarily give up power. Abraham later helped to secure the 1990–91 Haitian general election, in which Aristide was elected president. However, his ambitious reformist agenda worried the elites, and in September 1991, he was overthrown by the military, led by Raoul Cédras, in the 1991 Haitian coup d'état. Amidst the continuing turmoil many Haitians attempted to flee the country.

In September 1994, the United States negotiated the departure of Haiti's military leaders and the peaceful entry of 20,000 US troops under Operation Uphold Democracy. This enabled the restoration of the democratically-elected Aristide as president, who returned to Haiti in October to complete his term. As part of the deal Aristide had to implement free market reforms in an attempt to improve the Haitian economy, with mixed results. In November 1994, Hurricane Gordon brushed Haiti, dumping heavy rain and creating flash flooding that triggered mudslides. Gordon killed an estimated 1,122 to 2,200 people.

The 1995 general election was won by René Préval, gaining 88% of the popular vote, albeit on a low turnout. Aristide subsequently formed his own party, Fanmi Lavalas, and political deadlock ensued; the November 2000 election returned Aristide to the presidency with 92% of the vote. The election had been boycotted by the opposition, then organized into the Convergence Démocratique, over a dispute in the May legislative elections. In subsequent years, there was increasing violence between rival political factions and human rights abuses. Aristide spent years negotiating with the Convergence Démocratique on new elections, but the Convergence's inability to develop a sufficient electoral base made elections unattractive.

In 2004, an anti-Aristide revolt began in northern Haiti. The rebellion eventually reached the capital, and Aristide was forced into exile. The nature of the events are disputed; some, including Aristide and his bodyguard Franz Gabriel, stated that he was the victim of a "new coup d'état or modern kidnapping" by U.S. forces. These charges were denied by the US government. As political violence and crime continued to grow, a United Nations Stabilisation Mission (MINUSTAH) was brought in to maintain order. However, MINUSTAH proved controversial, since their periodically heavy-handed approach to maintaining law and order and several instances of abuses, including the alleged sexual abuse of civilians, provoked resentment and distrust among Haitians. Boniface Alexandre assumed interim authority until 2006, when René Préval was re-elected president following the 2006 elections with 55% voter turnout.

==== Post-Aristide era (2004–present) ====
Amidst the continuing political chaos, a series of natural disasters hit Haiti. In 2004, Tropical Storm Jeanne skimmed the north coast, leaving 3,006 people dead in flooding and mudslides, mostly in Gonaïves. In 2008, Haiti was again struck by tropical storms; Tropical Storm Fay, Hurricane Gustav, Hurricane Hanna and Hurricane Ike all produced heavy winds and rain, resulting in 331 deaths and about 800,000 in need of humanitarian aid. The state of affairs produced by these storms was intensified by already high food and fuel prices that had caused a food crisis and political unrest in April 2008.

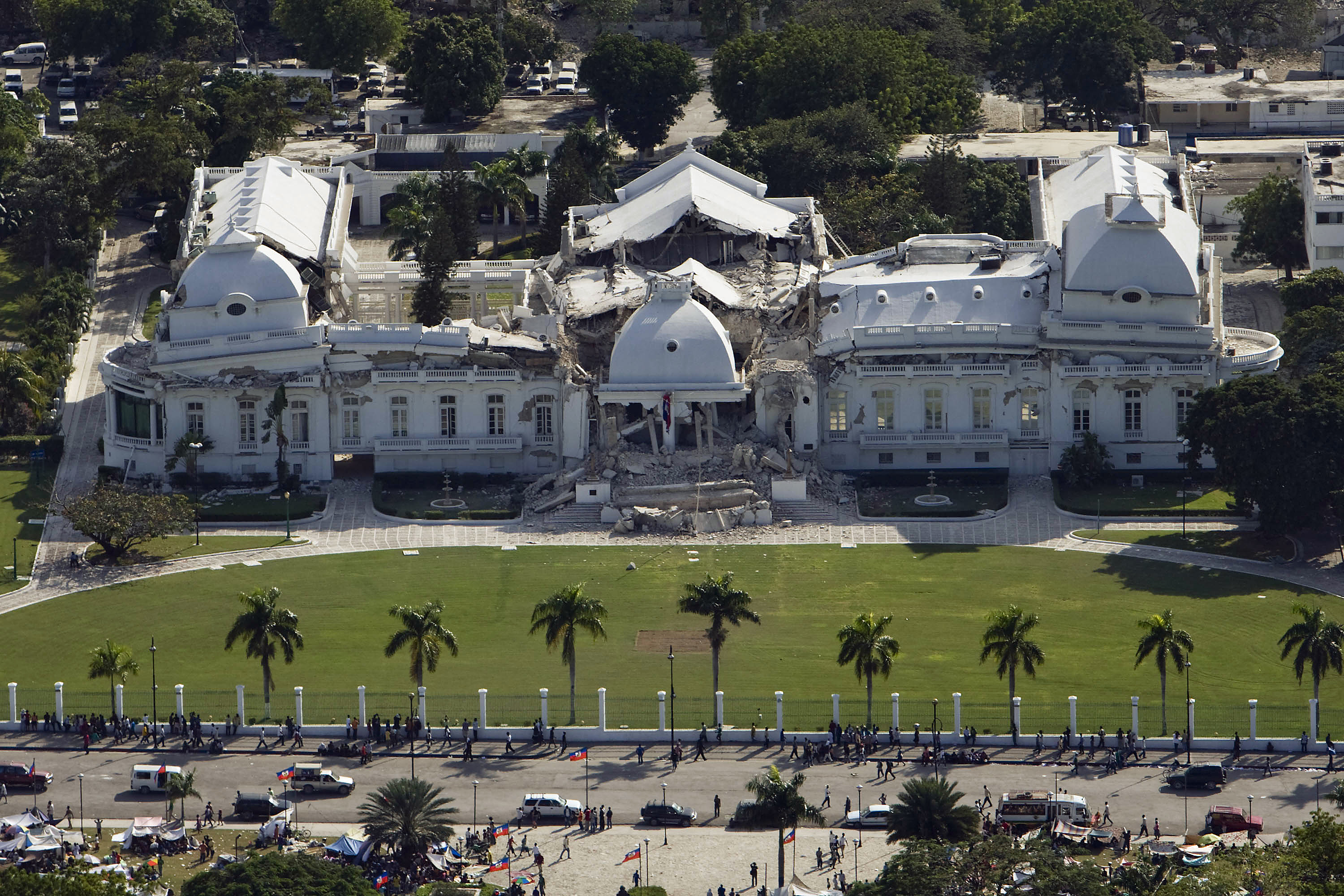
The Haitian National Palace, located in Port-au-Prince, was heavily damaged after the earthquake of 2010, and officially demolished in 2012. It was originally a two-story structure; the second story completely collapsed.

On 12 January 2010, Haiti was struck by a magnitude-7.0 earthquake. This was the country's most severe earthquake in over 200 years. The earthquake was reported to have left between 160,000 and 316,000 people dead and up to 1.6 million homeless, making it one of the deadliest natural disasters ever recorded. An estimated 80% of schools and more than half of Haiti's hospitals were destroyed or damaged. The situation was exacerbated by a subsequent massive cholera outbreak that was triggered when cholera-infected waste from a United Nations peacekeeping station contaminated the country's main river, the Artibonite. In 2017, it was reported that roughly 10,000 Haitians had died and nearly a million had been made ill. After years of denial, the United Nations apologized in 2016, but as of 2017, they have refused to acknowledge fault, thus avoiding financial responsibility.

General elections had been planned for January 2010, but were postponed due to the earthquake. Elections were held on 28 November 2010 for the senate, the parliament and the first round of the presidential elections. The run-off between Michel Martelly and Mirlande Manigat declared Martelly the winner. In 2011, both former presidents Jean-Claude Duvalier and Jean-Bertrand Aristide returned to Haiti; attempts to try Duvalier for crimes committed under his rule were shelved following his death in 2014. In 2013, the Haitian government called for European governments to pay reparations for slavery and establish an official commission for the settlement of past wrongdoings. Meanwhile, after continuing political wrangling with the opposition and allegations of electoral fraud, Martelly agreed to step down in 2016 without a successor in place. After numerous postponements, partly owing to the effects of devastating Hurricane Matthew, elections were held in November 2016 with a record low voter turnout of just 17%. The victor, Jovenel Moïse of the Haitian Tèt Kale Party, was sworn in as the 48th president in 2017.

Protests began on 7 July 2018 in response to increased fuel prices. Over time, these protests evolved into demands for the resignation of president Moïse. On 7 July 2021, Moïse was assassinated in an attack on his private residence, and First Lady Martine Moïse was hospitalized in Miami. Amid the political crisis, the government of Haiti installed Ariel Henry as the acting prime minister on 20 July. On 14 August, Haiti suffered another huge earthquake, with many casualties. The earthquake also damaged Haiti's economic conditions and led to a rise in gang violence which by September 2021 had escalated to a long-lasting full-blown gang war and other violent crimes within the country. As of March 2022, Haiti still has no president, no parliamentary quorum, and a dysfunctional high court due to a lack of judges. 2022 protests against the government and rising fuel prices intensified.

By late 2023, gangs and armed groups controlled an estimated 80% of the capital, Port-au-Prince. During 2023, gangs killed 4,789 people, kidnapped 2,490 more and displaced an estimated 362,000 from their homes (mostly in Port-au-Prince). Doctors, lawyers, and other wealthy members of society were kidnapped and held for ransom. Many victims were killed when ransom demands were not met, leading those with the means to do so to flee the country, further hampering efforts to pull the country out of the crisis. It is estimated that amidst the crisis up to 20% of qualified medical staff had left Haiti by the end of 2023.

In March 2024, Ariel Henry was prevented by gangs from returning to Haiti, following a visit to Kenya. Henry agreed to resign once a transitional government had been formed. As of that month, nearly half of Haiti's population was living under acute food insecurity, according to the World Food Programme. On 25 April 2024, the Transitional Presidential Council took over the governance of Haiti and remained in power until 7 February 2026, after no presidential election was held. Michel Patrick Boisvert was named acting prime minister. On 3 June 2024, the council swore in Garry Conille as acting prime minister. On 10 November, Alix Didier Fils-Aimé replaced Conille as acting prime minister. Under Fils-Aimé, elections were scheduled to be held on 13 December 2026, but were postponed indefinitely due to gang activity disrupting preparations.

== Geography ==
Topographical map of Haiti

Haiti forms the western three-eighths of Hispaniola, the second largest island in the Greater Antilles. At 27,750 km^{2} (10,710 sq mi) Haiti is the third largest country in the Caribbean behind Cuba and the Dominican Republic, the latter sharing a 360-kilometer (224 mi) border with Haiti. The country has a roughly horseshoe shape and because of this it has a disproportionately long coastline, second in length (1,771 km or 1,100 mi) behind Cuba in the Greater Antilles.

Haiti is the most mountainous country in the Caribbean. Its terrain consists of mountains interspersed with small coastal plains and river valleys. Plains are only 22% of its territory. The climate is tropical, with some variation depending on altitude. The highest point is Pic la Selle, at 2,680 meters (8,793 ft).

The northern region or Marien Region consists of the Massif du Nord (Northern Massif) and the Plaine du Nord (Northern Plain). The Massif du Nord is an extension of the Cordillera Central in the Dominican Republic. It begins at Haiti's eastern border, north of the Guayamouc River, and extends to the northwest through the northern peninsula. The lowlands of the Plaine du Nord lie along the northern border with the Dominican Republic, between the Massif du Nord and the North Atlantic Ocean.

The central region or Artibonite Region consists of two plains and two sets of mountain ranges. The Plateau Central (Central Plateau) extends along both sides of the Guayamouc River, south of the Massif du Nord. It runs from the southeast to the northwest. To the southwest of the Plateau Central are the Montagnes Noires, whose most northwestern part merges with the Massif du Nord. The most important valley in terms of crops is the Plaine de l'Artibonite, which lies between the Montagnes Noires and the Chaîne des Matheux. This region contains the country's longest river, the Riviere l'Artibonite, which begins in the western region of the Dominican Republic and continues for most of its length through central Haiti, where it then empties into the Golfe de la Gonâve. Also in this valley lies Haiti's second largest lake, Lac de Péligre, formed as a result of the construction of the Péligre Dam in the mid-1950s.

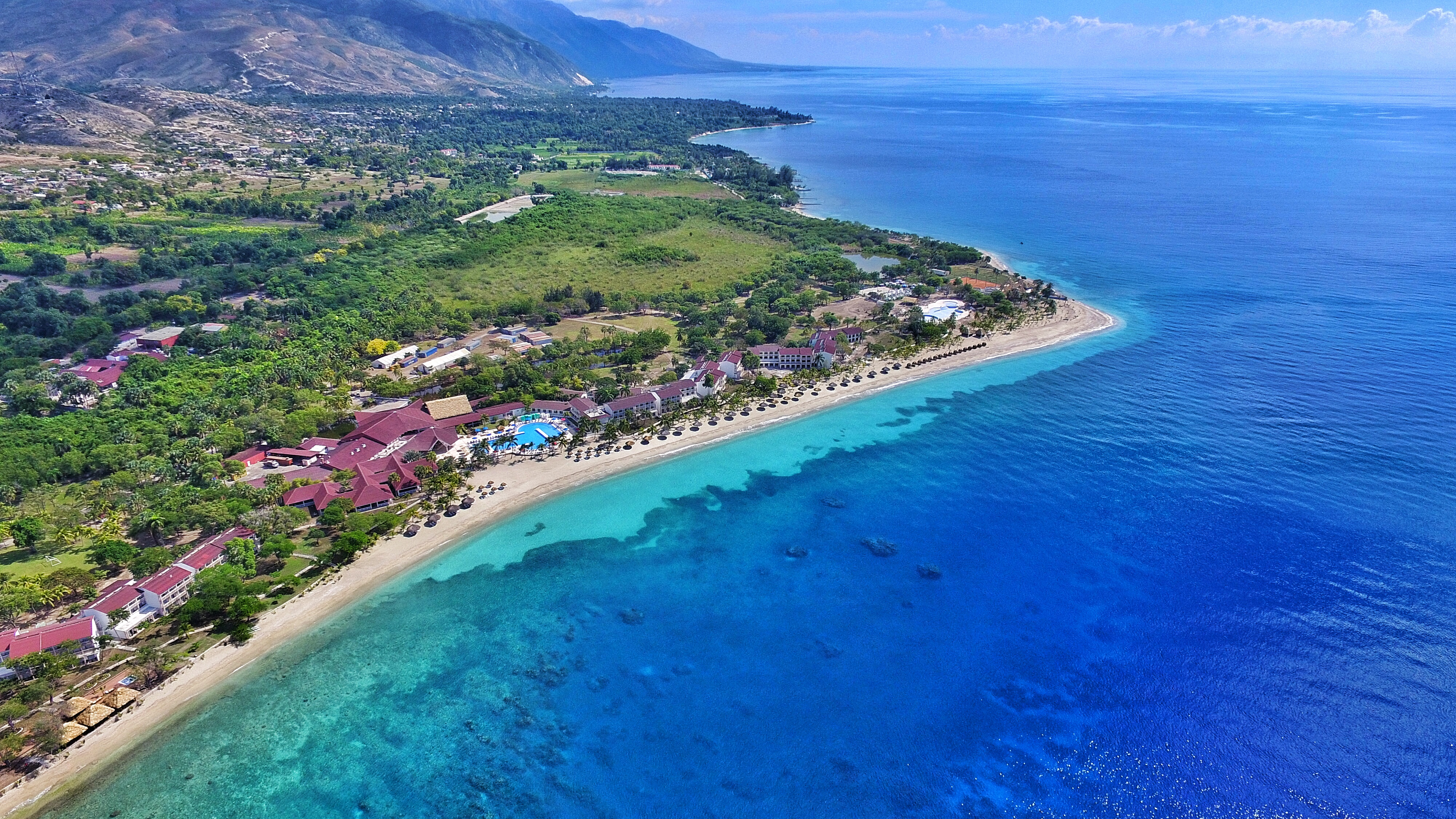
Saint-Marc Arrondissement, Artibonite Department

The southern region or Xaragua Region consists of the Plaine du Cul-de-Sac (the southeast) and the mountainous southern peninsula (the Tiburon Peninsula). The Plaine du Cul-de-Sac is a natural depression that harbors the country's saline lakes, such as Trou Caïman and Haiti's largest lake, Étang Saumatre. The Chaîne de la Selle mountain range – an extension of the southern mountain chain of the Dominican Republic (the Sierra de Baoruco) – extends from the Massif de la Selle in the east to the Massif de la Hotte in the west.

Haiti includes several offshore islands. The island of Tortuga is located off the coast of northern Haiti. The arrondissement of La Gonâve is located on the island of the same name, in the Golfe de la Gonâve; Haiti's largest island, Gonâve is moderately populated by rural villagers. Île à Vache is located off the southwest coast; also part of Haiti are the Cayemites, located in the Gulf of Gonâve north of Pestel. Navassa Island, located 40 nautical miles (46 mi; 74 km) west of Jérémie on the southwest peninsula, is subject to an ongoing territorial dispute with the United States, who currently administer the island.

=== Climate ===
Köppen climate types of Haiti

The climate is tropical with some variation depending on altitude. Port-au-Prince ranges in January from an average minimum of 23 °C (73.4 °F) to an average maximum of 31 °C (87.8 °F); in July, from 25–35 °C (77–95 °F). The rainfall pattern is varied, with rain heavier in some of the lowlands and the northern and eastern slopes of the mountains. The dry season occurs from November to January.

Port-au-Prince receives an average annual rainfall of 1,370 mm (53.9 in). There are two rainy seasons, April–June and October–November. Haiti is subject to periodic droughts and floods, made more severe by deforestation. Hurricanes are a menace, and the country is prone to flooding and earthquakes.

=== Geology ===
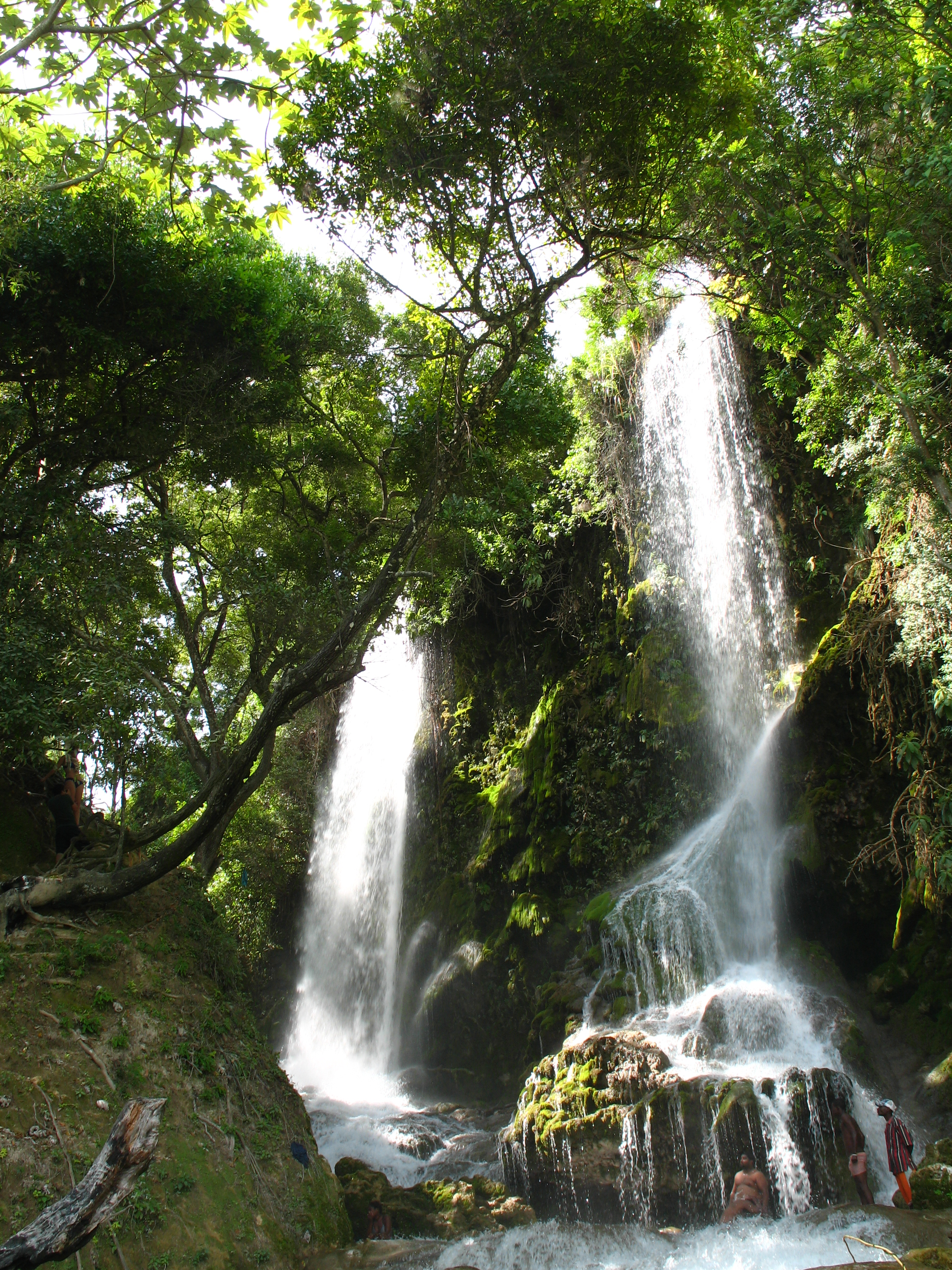
Saut-d'Eau waterfall

There are blind thrust faults associated with the Enriquillo-Plantain Garden fault system over which Haiti lies. After the earthquake of 2010, there was no evidence of surface rupture, and geologists' findings were based on seismological, geological and ground deformation data. The northern boundary of the fault is where the Caribbean plate shifts eastwards by about 20 mm (0.79 inches) per year in relation to the North American plate. The strike-slip fault system in the region has two branches in Haiti, the Septentrional-Oriente fault in the north and the Enriquillo-Plantain Garden fault in the south.

A 2007 earthquake hazard study notes that the Enriquillo-Plantain Garden fault zone could be at the end of its seismic cycle and concludes that a worst-case forecast would involve a 7.2 M_{w} earthquake, similar in size to the 1692 Jamaica earthquake. A study team performing a hazard assessment of the fault system recommended "high priority" historical geologic rupture studies, as the fault was fully locked and had recorded few earthquakes in the preceding 40 years. A magnitude 7.0 earthquake happened on this fault zone on 12 January 2010.

Haiti has rare elements such as gold, which can be found at the Mont Organisé gold mine. There are no currently active volcanoes; no volcanic activity has been experienced since the Miocene age.

=== Environment ===
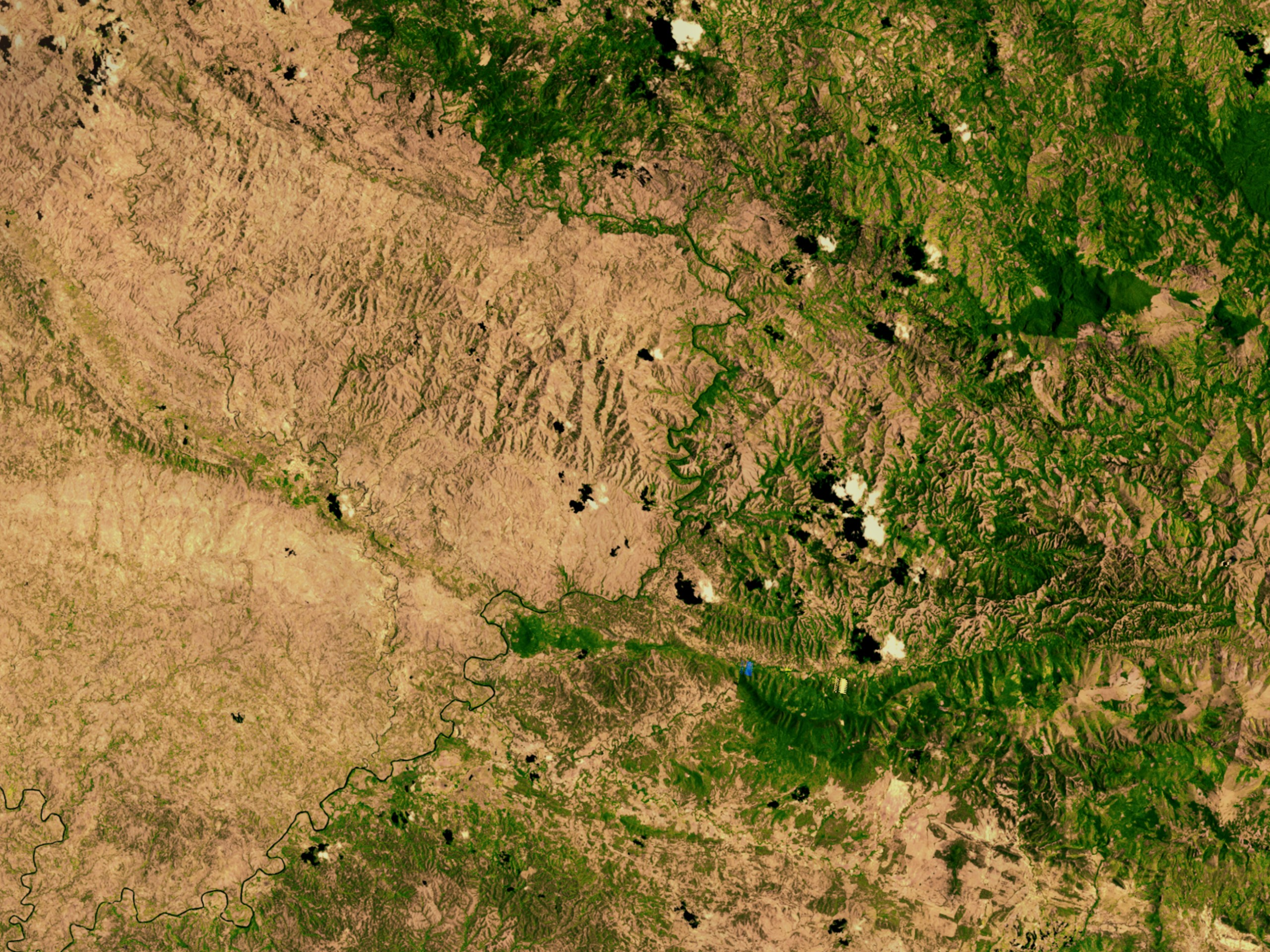
Haiti's border with the Dominican Republic in 2002, showing the extent of deforestation on the Haitian side (left)

The soil erosion released from the upper catchments and deforestation have caused periodic and severe flooding, as experienced, for example, on 17 September 2004. Earlier in May that year, floods had killed over 3,000 people on Haiti's southern border with the Dominican Republic.

Haiti's forests covered 60% of the country as recently as 50 years ago, but that has been halved to a current estimate of 30% tree cover. This estimate poses a stark difference from the erroneous figure of 2% which has been oft-cited in discourse concerning the country's environmental condition. Haiti had a 2019 Forest Landscape Integrity Index mean score of 4.01/10, ranking it 137th globally out of 172 countries. Major national parks in Haiti include the La Visite National Park and the Pic Macaya National Park.

Scientists at the Columbia University's Center for International Earth Science Information Network and the United Nations Environment Programme are working on the Haiti Regenerative Initiative, an initiative aiming to reduce poverty and natural disaster vulnerability through ecosystem restoration and sustainable resource management.

==== Biodiversity ====
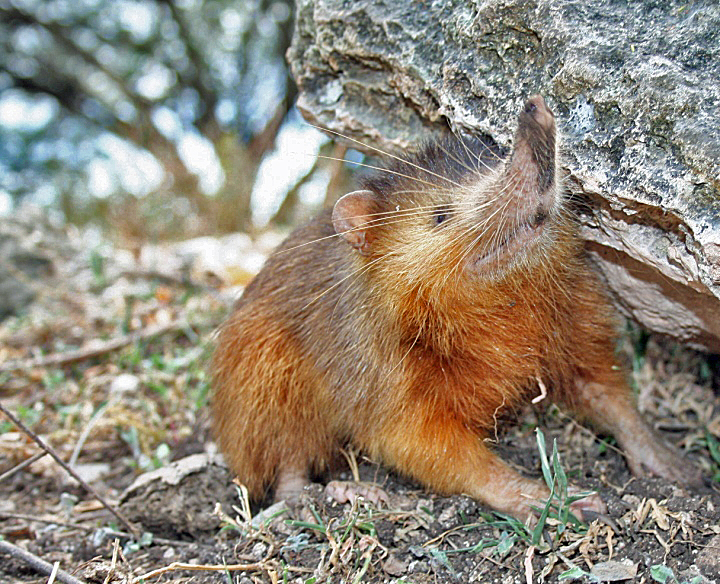
The endangered Hispaniolan solenodon, endemic to the island

Haiti is home to four ecoregions: Hispaniolan moist forests, Hispaniolan dry forests, Hispaniolan pine forests, and Greater Antilles mangroves. Despite its small size, the mountainous terrain and resultant multiple climatic zones have resulted in a wide variety of plant life. About 5,000 species of plants have been identified in Haiti, including over 3,000 woody plants, trees, and shrubs, 600 species of fern, and 160 orchids. Notable tree species include the breadfruit tree, mango tree, acacia, mahogany, coconut palm, royal palm and West Indian cedar.

Most mammal species are not native, having been brought to the island since colonial times. However, there are various native bat species, as well as the endemic Hispaniolan hutia and Hispaniolan solenodon. Whale and dolphin species can be found off the coast. There are over 260 species of birds, 31 endemic to Hispaniola. Notable endemic species include the Hispaniolan trogon, Hispaniolan parakeet, grey-crowned tanager and the Hispaniolan amazon. There are also several raptors, as well as pelicans, ibis, hummingbirds and ducks. Reptiles are common, with species such as the rhinoceros iguana, Haitian boa, American crocodile and gecko.

== Government and politics ==
Vacant
President

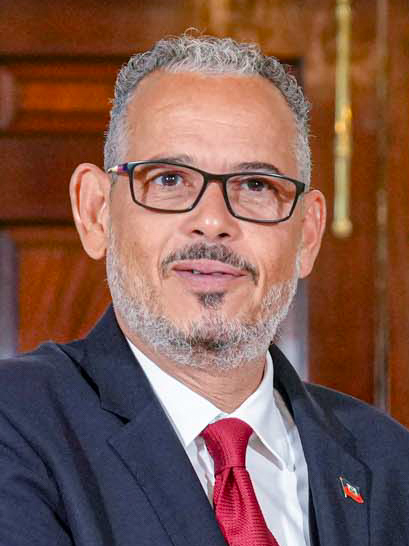
Alix Didier Fils-Aimé
Acting Prime Minister

The government is a semi-presidential republic, a multiparty system wherein the president of Haiti is head of state and elected directly by popular elections held every five years. A president cannot serve two consecutive terms or more than two terms in total, but can be reelected for a second term after an interval. The prime minister of Haiti acts as head of government and is appointed by the president, chosen from the majority party in the National Assembly. Executive power is exercised by the president and prime minister who together constitute the government. The president is the nominal commander-in-chief of the Armed Forces of Haiti and the National Police.

Legislative power is vested in the two chambers of the National Assembly of Haiti, the Senate and the Chamber of Deputies. Deputies and senators are both directly elected; deputies for a term of four years and senators for six years. There are three senators from each department of Haiti and at least one deputy from each commune, with larger communes having up to three deputies. Elections are meant to be held for the entire chamber every four years, and for one-third of the Senate every two years. The judicial branch includes the Supreme Court of Haiti (also called the Court of Cassation) and the Courts of Appeals, with justices for the former appointed by the president from a list recommended by the Senate, and for the latter recommended by department assemblies.

The current structure of Haiti's political system was set forth in the Constitution of Haiti in 1987 and was amended in 2012. The constitution creates a division of executive, legislative, and judicial powers. Haitian politics have been contentious; since independence, Haiti has suffered 32 coups. A long history of oppression by dictators such as François Duvalier and his son Jean-Claude Duvalier has markedly affected the republic's governance and society, and since then Haiti has been transitioning to a democratic system. Jovenel Moïse, who was elected as president in 2016, was assassinated in 2021 amidst an ongoing gang conflict, worsening a political crisis. With the presidency vacant, and the National Assembly and judiciary no longer functioning, there have been no elected officials in Haiti since 2023, and the political architecture set by the constitution exists only on paper.

The Transitional Presidential Council with nine members was created when acting prime minister Ariel Henry was forced to resign abroad on 24 April 2024. The council intended to hold a two-round election in November 2025 and January 2026, to inaugurate a new government in February 2026, but it has been undermined by corruption scandals and infighting. The Haitian government and the Kenyan-led Multinational Security Support Mission, have not been able to restore public safety in the country. The planned election was further delayed until the second half of 2026 due to violence, and the expiration of the Council's mandate on 7 February 2026 left acting prime minister Alix Didier Fils-Aimé as the sole executive until the election, with the support of several major political parties.

Haiti is a member of a wide range of international and regional organizations, such as the United Nations, CARICOM, Community of Latin American and Caribbean States, International Monetary Fund, Organisation of American States, Organisation internationale de la Francophonie, OPANAL and the World Trade Organization.

=== Administrative divisions ===
Departments of Haiti

Haiti is divided into ten departments, which are the largest territorial units. The departments are further divided into 42 arrondissements, 145 communes and 571 communal sections. Departments and communes have autonomy from the central government in their administration and finances. Communal sections, communes, and departments are led by a three-member council which is elected either by universal suffrage (in communal sections) or by an assembly in communes and departments. An assembly consists of representatives from each of the previous level of territorial units.

#	Department	Capital	Area		Population (2015 census)
#	Department	Capital	km^{2}	mi^{2}	Population (2015 census)
1	Nord-Ouest	Port-de-Paix	2,103	812	728,807
2	Nord	Cap-Haïtien	2,115	817	1,067,177
3	Nord-Est	Fort-Liberté	1,623	627	393,967
4	Artibonite	Gonaïves	4,887	1,887	1,727,524
5	Centre	Hinche	3,487	1,346	746,236
6	Ouest	Port-au-Prince	4,983	1,924	4,029,705
7	Grand'Anse	Jérémie	1,912	738	468,301
8	Nippes	Miragoâne	1,268	489	342,325
9	Sud	Les Cayes	2,654	1,025	774,976
10	Sud-Est	Jacmel	2,034	785	632,601

=== Military and law enforcement ===
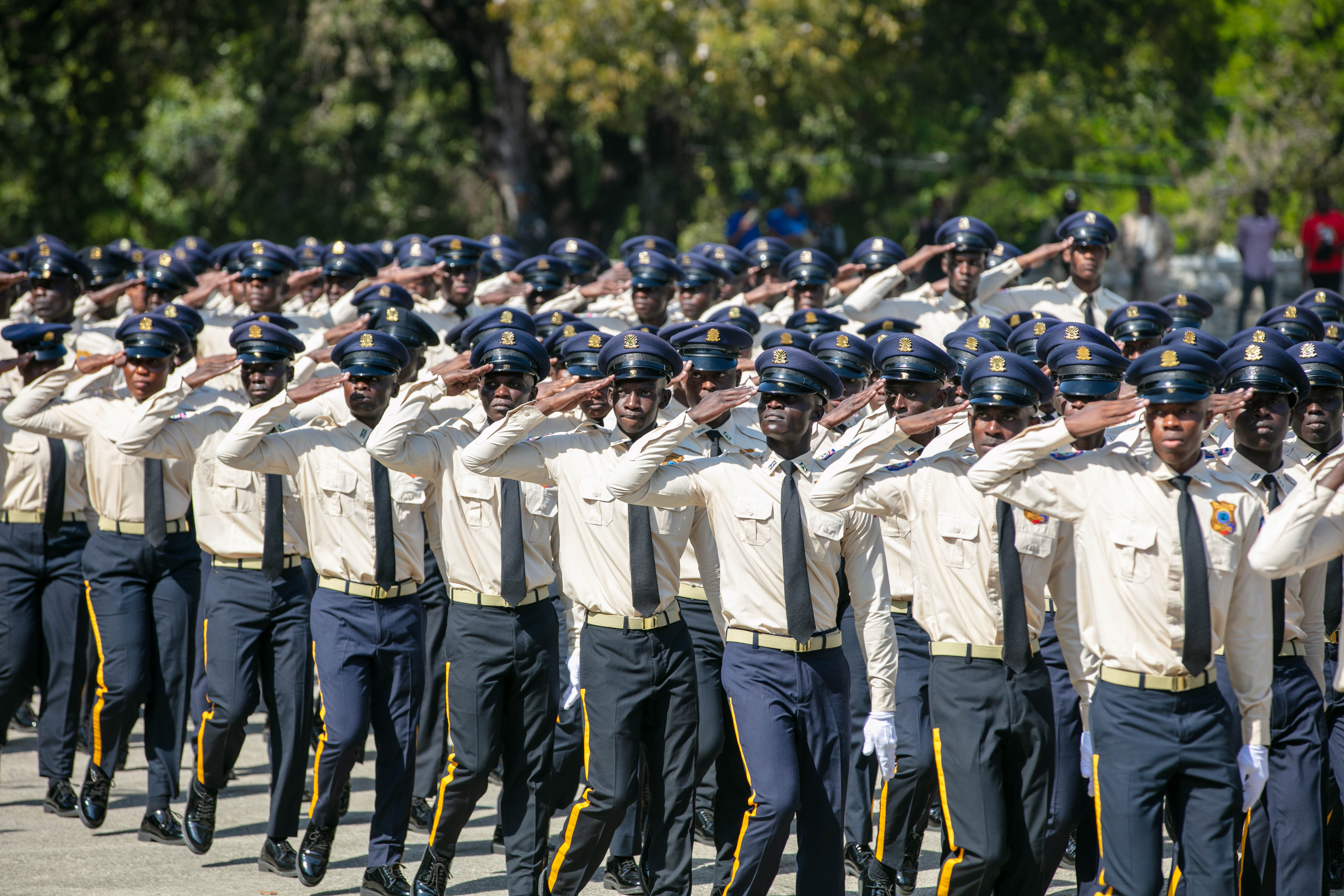
Newly graduated Haitian National Police officers in 2025

The Armed Forces of Haiti (FAd'H) and the Haitian National Police (PNH) together officially make up the Public Force of Haiti, whose personnel take an oath to the constitution and the flag of the country. The Armed Forces consist of the land, sea, and air forces, along with technical support. They are led by an active-duty general officer who is appointed as the commander-in-chief of the Armed Forces of Haiti. The Ministry of Defense is the main oversight body of the armed forces while the police are part of the Ministry of Justice and Public Security. The constitutional duties of the FA'dH include defending the country's borders, responding to natural disasters, and providing assistance to the police. The 1987 constitution provides the basis for conscription, though it has never been used. The Armed Forces were disbanded in 1995 and security became solely the responsibility of the civilian National Police until 2017. As of 2023 the Armed Forces had a strength of 2,000 service members, who were trained in nearby countries. The military has had a small role during the gang war, which includes protecting government officials.

The National Police was established in 1995 to replace the military's former role in law enforcement, initially recruited from among former military personnel and Haitian migrants to the United States. In 1999 it had 6,000 members; in 2010, it numbered 7,000; and in 2016 it had 9,000. It is led by a director-general appointed by the president. The PNH consists of the Administrative Police for day-to-day police work, the Judicial Police for investigations, and some specialized units that include presidential security, riot control, a SWAT team, and the Haitian Coast Guard. Under-equipped and understaffed, it has been unable maintain security in the entire Haitian territory, despite some improvements to its capability by 2012. Since the start of the gang war in 2020 the PNH has seen increasingly high levels of desertion and casualties.

=== Law and crime ===
The legal system is based on a modified version of the Napoleonic Code. Haiti has consistently ranked among the most corrupt countries in the world on the Corruption Perceptions Index. According to a 2006 report by the Corruption Perceptions Index, there is a strong correlation between corruption and poverty in Haiti. The republic ranked first of all countries surveyed for levels of perceived domestic corruption. It is estimated that President "Baby Doc" Duvalier, his wife Michele, and their agents stole US$504 million from the treasury between 1971 and 1986. Some media outlets alleged that millions were stolen by President Aristide. The BBC described pyramid schemes in which Haitians lost hundreds of millions in 2002, as the "only real economic initiative" of the Aristide years.

After the fall of the military government in the early 1990s, the presence of a large quantity of firearms and paramilitary groups (consisting of former soldiers, gangsters, and other criminal elements) gave Haiti one of the highest crime rates in the world as of 2005. According to the 2023 United Nations Office on Drugs and Crime report, due to escalating gang violence and the near-collapse of state institutions, the security situation has deteriorated sharply. The official homicide rate for Haiti more than doubled in 2023 to approximately 40.9 per 100,000 (with 4,789 homicides reported by the UN). According to the UN, Haiti faces a worsening crisis marked by extreme violence, political instability, and a deepening humanitarian emergency. UN Special Representative Virginia Gamba condemned the use of children by armed gangs, highlighting sexual violence as a weapon of war. The removal of Prime Minister Garry Conille has further destabilized governance. Armed groups have targeted schools and hospitals, displacing thousands and leaving 300,000 children without education. The UN calls for urgent humanitarian aid, enhanced security efforts, and political unity to address the crisis, as over 2.7 million people live under gang control.

Port-au-Prince penitentiary is home to half of Haiti's prisoners. The prison has a capacity of 1,200 detainees, but as of November 2017 the penitentiary was obliged to keep 4,359 detainees, a 363% occupancy level. The inability to receive sufficient funds has caused deadly cases of malnutrition, combined with the tight living conditions, increases the risk of infectious diseases such as tuberculosis. Haitian law states that once arrested, one must go before a judge within 48 hours; however, this is very rare. Unless families are able to provide the necessary funds for inmates to appear before a judge, there is a very slim chance the inmate would have a trial, on average, within 10 years. In confined living spaces for 22–23 hours a day, inmates are not provided with latrines and are forced to defecate into plastic bags. These conditions were considered inhumane by the Inter-American Court of Human Rights in 2008. On 3 March 2024, armed gangs stormed the main prison in Port-au-Prince, and about 3,700 inmates escaped, while 12 people were killed.

== Economy ==
Historical GDP per capita development

The economy of Haiti declined dramatically after the 2010 earthquake and subsequent outbreak of cholera, with the country's nominal GDP falling by 8% (from US$12.15 billion to US$11.18 billion). Since then it has grown to US$33.55 billion in nominal GDP as of 2025, and during the same time period it grew from $26.88 billion to $38.2 billion in PPP-adjusted GDP. Despite its tourism industry, Haiti is the poorest country in the Western Hemisphere, with corruption, political instability, poor infrastructure, lack of health care and lack of education cited as the main causes. Haiti ranked 145th of 182 countries in the 2010 United Nations Human Development Index, with 57.3% of the population being deprived in at least three of the HDI's poverty measures. As of 2021, about 30% of the population lived in extreme poverty (making less than US$2.15 a day), and 87.6% made less than US$6.85. There is a division between the formal economy, which is controlled by an upper class and is concentrated in certain areas, and an informal economy that represents 90% of employment.

Haiti became a member of the World Trade Organization in 1996. It liberalized its economy in the 1980s, removing tariff and non-tariff barriers, which had an impact on domestic businesses, especially in the agricultural sector. The existence of monopolies and oligopolies in many economic markets distorts the price setting mechanism, and is why the cost of goods and services in Haiti is the highest in the region. Following the disputed 2000 election and accusations about President Aristide's rule, U.S. aid to the Haitian government was cut off between 2001 and 2004. After Aristide's departure in 2004, aid was restored and the Brazilian army led a United Nations Stabilization Mission in Haiti peacekeeping operation. After almost four years of recession, the economy grew by 1.5% in 2005. In September 2009, Haiti met the conditions set out by the IMF and World Bank's Heavily Indebted Poor Countries program to qualify for cancellation of its external debt.

In 2015, more than 90 percent of the government's budget came from an agreement with Petrocaribe, a Venezuela-led oil alliance.

=== Foreign aid ===
Haiti received more than US$4 billion in aid from 1990 to 2003, including US$1.5 billion from the United States. The largest donor is the US, followed by Canada and the European Union. In January 2010, following the earthquake, US President Barack Obama promised US$1.15 billion in assistance. The European Union pledged more than €400 million (US$616 million). Dominican Republic provided extensive humanitarian aid, including the funding and construction of a public university, human capital, free healthcare services in the border region, and logistical support after the 2010 earthquake.

The United Nations states that US$13.34 billion has been earmarked for post-earthquake reconstruction through 2020, though two years after the 2010 quake, less than half of that amount had actually been released. As of 2015, the US government has allocated US$4 billion, US$3 billion has already been spent, and the rest is dedicated to longer-term projects.

=== Trade ===
According to the 2015 CIA World Factbook, Haiti's main import partners are: Dominican Republic 35%, US 26.8%, Netherlands Antilles 8.7%, China 7% (est. 2013). Haiti's main export partner is the US 83.5% (est. 2013). Haiti had a trade deficit of US$3 billion in 2011, or 41% of GDP.

=== Energy ===
Haiti electricity production by source

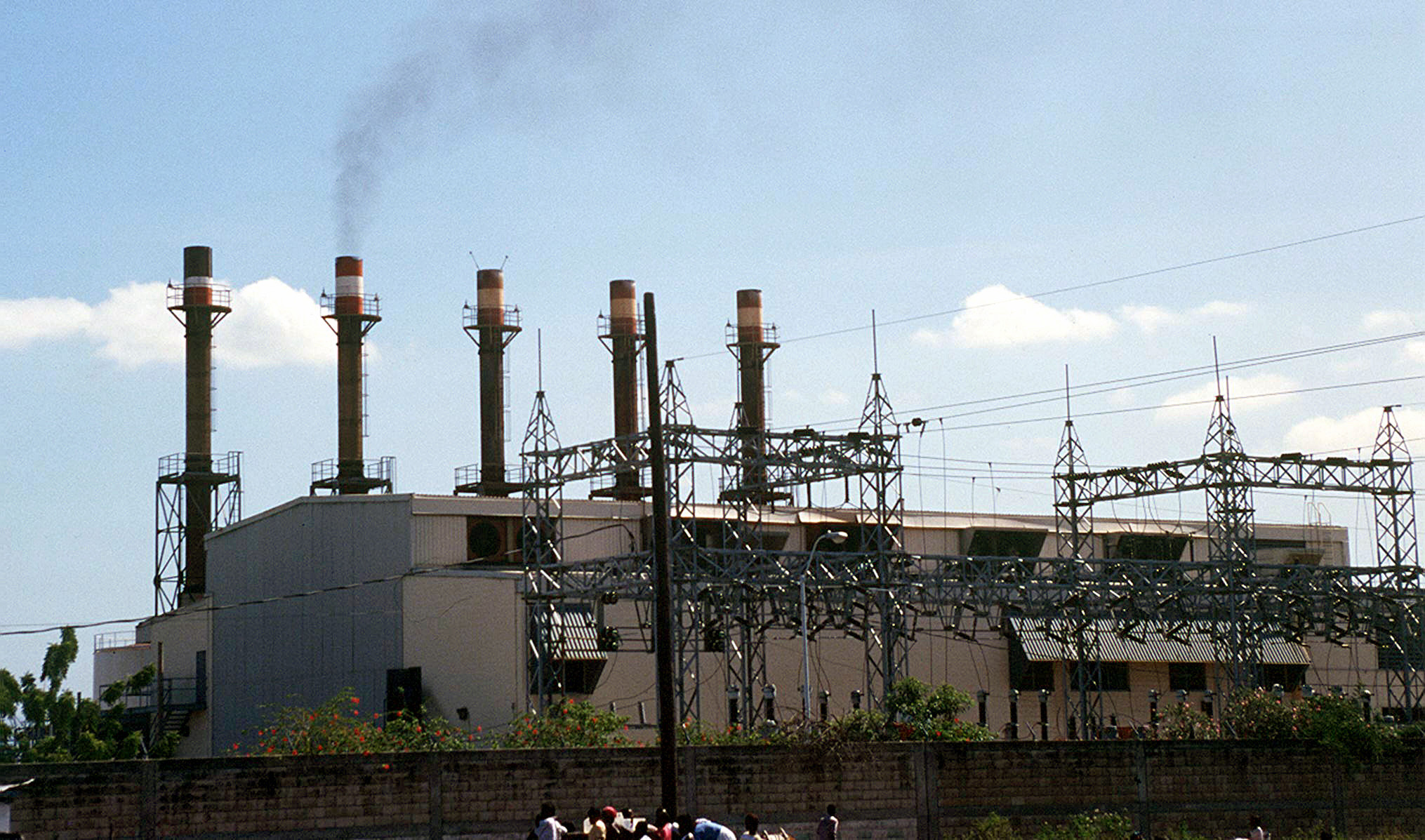
Power plant in Port-au-Prince

Haiti relies heavily on an oil alliance with Petrocaribe for much of its energy requirements. In recent years, hydroelectric, solar and wind energy have been explored as possible sustainable energy sources. As of 2017, among all the countries in the Americas, Haiti produces the least energy. Less than a quarter of the country has electric coverage. Most regions of Haiti that do have energy are powered by generators. These generators are often expensive and produce a lot of pollution. The areas that do get electricity experience power cuts on a daily basis, and some areas are limited to 12 hours of electricity a day. Electricity is provided by a small number of independent companies: Sogener, E-power, and Haytrac. There is no national electricity grid. The most common sources of energy are wood and charcoal. About 4 million metric tons of wood products are consumed yearly. Like charcoal and wood, petroleum is also an important source of energy. Since Haiti cannot produce its own fuel, all fuel is imported. Yearly, about 691,000 tons of oil is imported into the country.

In 2018, a 24-hour electricity project was announced; for this purpose 236 MW needs to be installed in Port-au-Prince alone, with an additional 75 MW needed in all other regions. Presently only 27.5% of the population has access to electricity; moreover, the national energy agency l'Électricité d'Haïti is only able to meet 62% of overall electricity demand.

=== Personal income ===
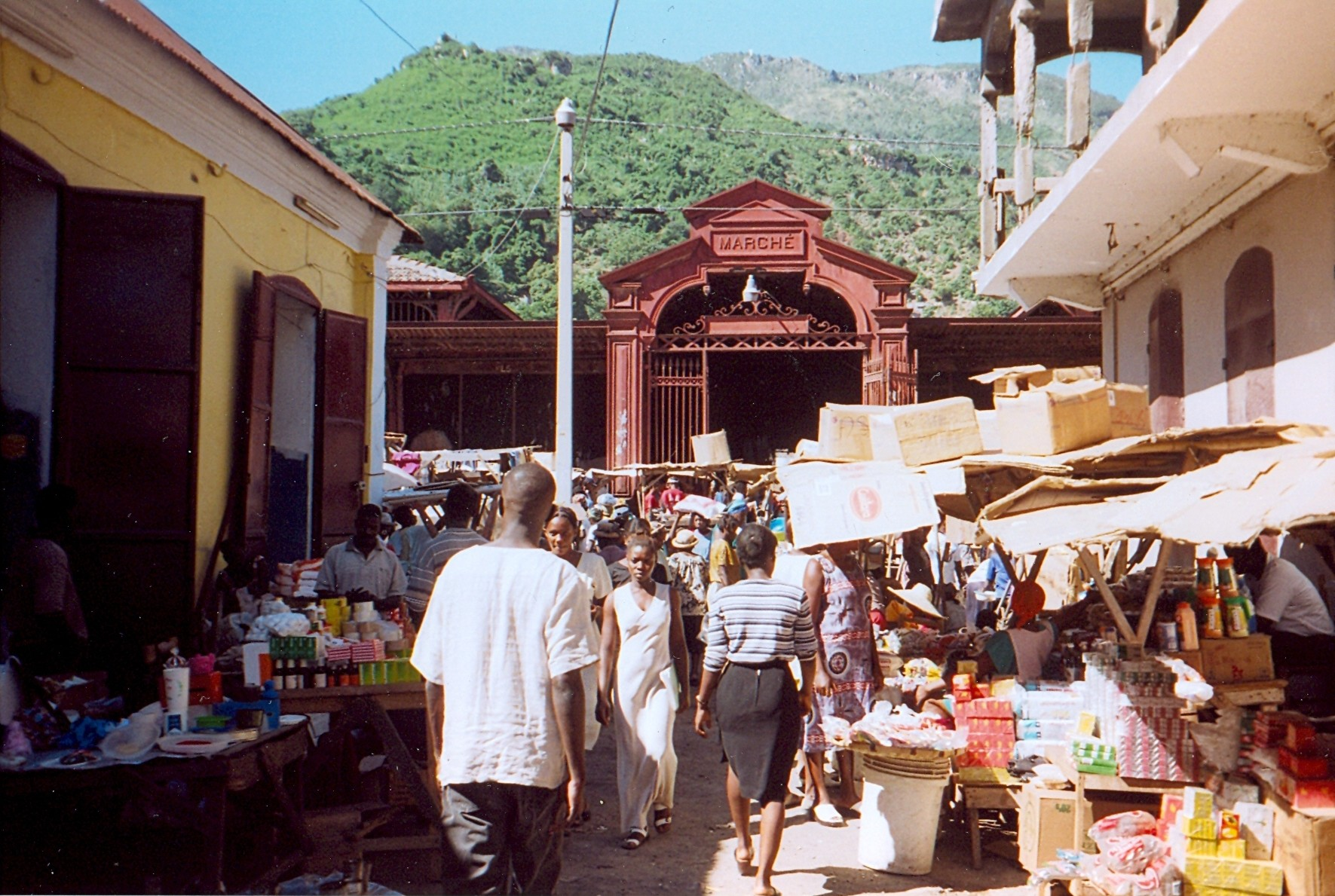
A market in Cap-Haïtien

Haiti suffers from a shortage of skilled labor, widespread unemployment, and underemployment. Most Haitians in the labor force have informal jobs. Three-quarters of the population lives on US$2 or less per day. Remittances from Haitians living abroad are the primary source of foreign exchange, equaling one-fifth (20%) of GDP and more than five times the earnings from exports as of 2012. In 2004, 80% or more of college graduates from Haiti were living abroad.

Occasionally, families who are unable to care for children may send them to live with a wealthier family as a restavek, or house servant. In return the family are supposed to ensure that the child is educated and provided with food and shelter; however, the system is open to abuse and has proved controversial, with some likening it to child slavery.

=== Real estate ===
In rural areas, people often live in wooden huts with corrugated iron roofs. Outhouses are located in back of the huts. In Port-au-Prince, shantytowns surround the central city and go up the mountainsides. The middle and upper classes live in suburbs, or in the central part of the bigger cities in apartments, where there is urban planning. Many of the houses they live in are like miniature fortresses, located behind walls embedded with metal spikes, barbed wire, broken glass, and sometimes all three. The houses have backup generators, because the electrical grid is unreliable. Some even have rooftop reservoirs for water.

=== Agriculture ===
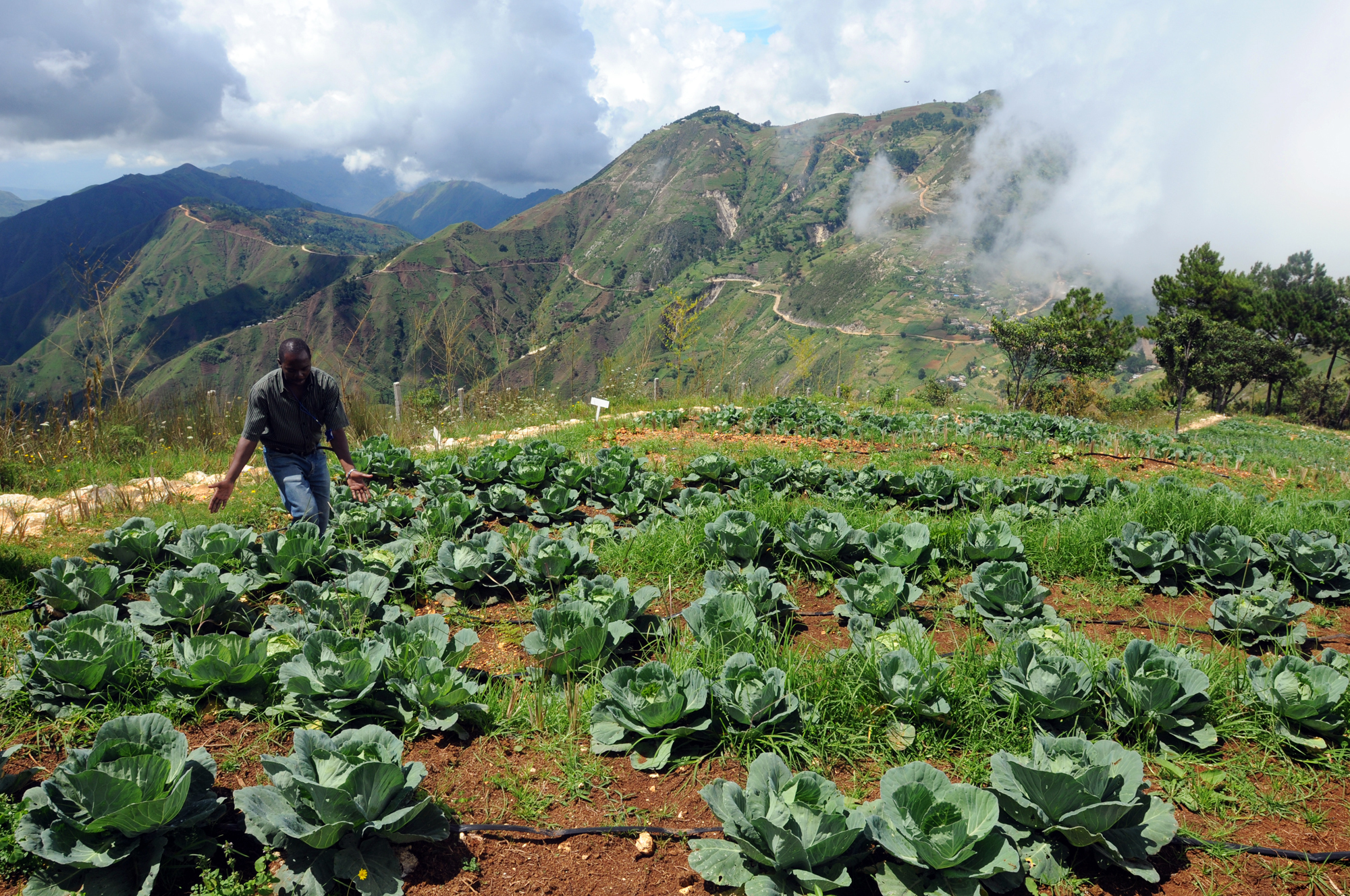
Rows of cabbage, Haiti

Haiti is the world's leading producer of vetiver, a root plant used to make luxury perfumes, essential oils and fragrances, providing for half the world's supply. Roughly 40–50% of Haitians work in the agricultural sector. However, according to soil surveys by the United States Department of Agriculture in the early 1980s, only 11.3 percent of the land was highly suitable for crops. Haiti relies upon imports for half its food needs and 80% of its rice.

Haiti exports crops such as mangoes, cacao, coffee, papayas, mahogany nuts, spinach, and watercress. Agricultural products constitute 6% of all exports. In addition, local agricultural products include maize, beans, cassava, sweet potato, peanuts, pistachios, bananas, millet, pigeon peas, sugarcane, rice, sorghum, and wood.

=== Currency ===
The Haitian gourde (HTG) is the national currency. The "Haitian dollar" equates to 5 gourdes (goud). The vast majority of the business sector and individuals will also accept US dollars, though at the outdoor markets gourdes may be preferred. Locals may refer to the USD as "dollar américain" (dola ameriken) or "dollar US" (pronounced oo-es).

=== Tourism ===
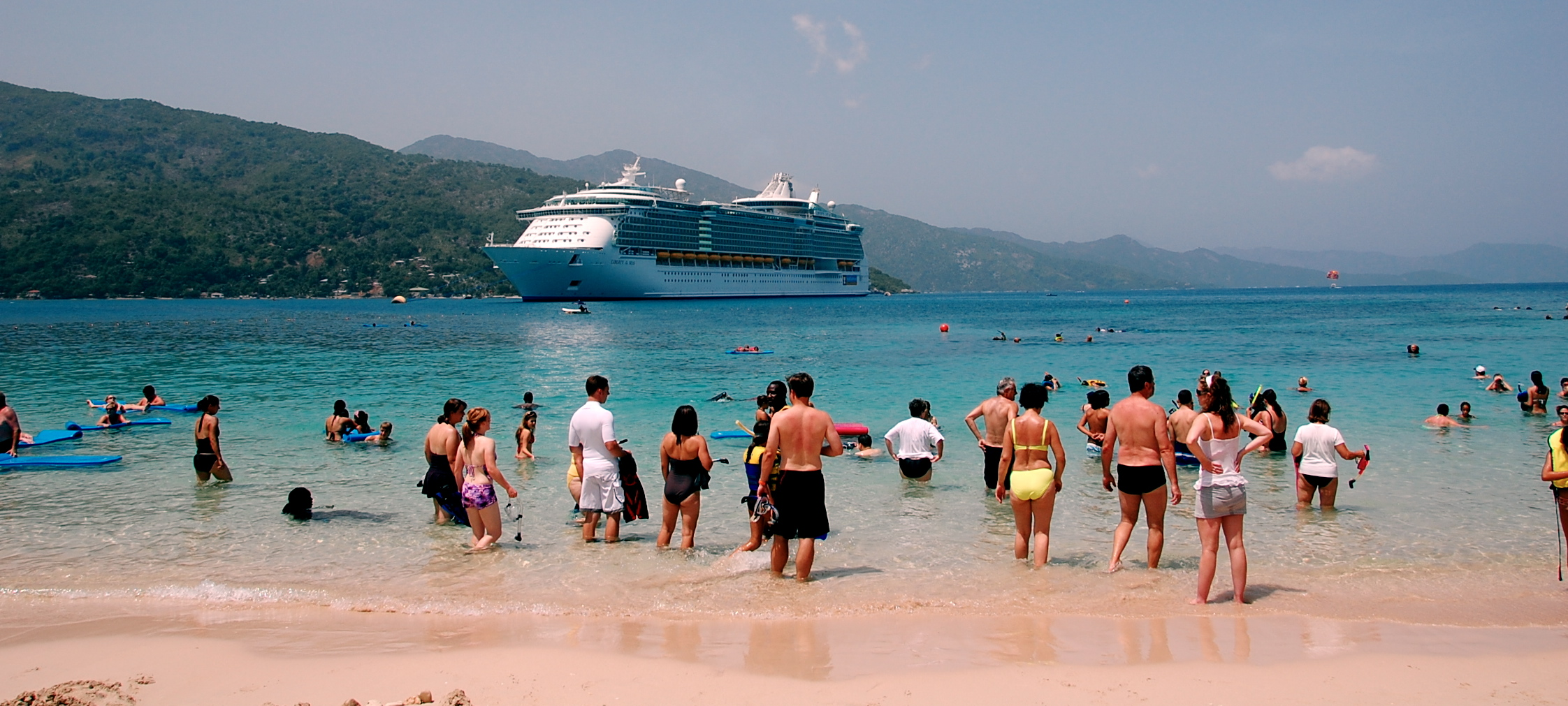
Labadee, a cruise ship destination

The tourism market in Haiti is undeveloped, and the government is heavily promoting this sector. Haiti has many of the features that attract tourists to other Caribbean destinations, such as white sand beaches, mountainous scenery and a year-round warm climate. However, the country's poor image overseas, at times exaggerated, has hampered the development of this sector. In 2014, the country received 1,250,000 tourists (mostly from cruise ships), and the industry generated US$200 million in 2014.

Several hotels were opened in 2014, including an upscale Best Western Premier, a five-star Royal Oasis hotel by Occidental Hotel and Resorts in Pétion-Ville, a four-star Marriott Hotel in the Turgeau area of Port-au-Prince and other new hotel developments in Port-au-Prince, Les Cayes, Cap-Haïtien and Jacmel.

=== Caracol Industrial Park ===
On 21 October 2012, Haitian President Michel Martelly, US Secretary of State Hillary Clinton, Bill Clinton, Richard Branson, Ben Stiller and Sean Penn inaugurated the 240-hectare (600-acre) Caracol industrial park, the largest in the Caribbean. The project cost US$300 million and included a 10-megawatt power plant, a water-treatment plant and worker housing. The plan for the park pre-dated the 2010 earthquake but was fast-tracked as part of US foreign aid strategy to help Haiti recover. The park was part of a "master plan" for Haiti's North and North-East departments, including the expansion of the Cap-Haïtien International Airport to accommodate large international flights, the construction of an international seaport in Fort-Liberté and the opening of the $50 million Roi Henri Christophe Campus of a new university in Limonade (near Cap-Haïtien) on 12 January 2012.

In 2012, USAID believed the park had the potential to create as many as 65,000 jobs once fully developed. South Korean clothing manufacturer Sae-A Trading Co. Ltd, the park's only major tenant, created 5,000 permanent jobs out of the 20,000 it had projected and promised to build 5,000 houses yet only 750 homes had been built near Caracol by 2014.

Ten years later, the park was considered to have failed to uphold its promise to deliver the transformation the Clintons had promised. The US invested tens of millions of dollars into the port project but eventually abandoned it. In order to establish the park, hundreds of families of small farmers had to be removed from the land, approximately 3,500 people overall. An audit by the United States Government Accountability Office uncovered that the port project lacked "staff with technical expertise in planning, construction, and oversight of a port" and revealed that USAID had not constructed a port anywhere since the 1970s. A USAID feasibility study in 2015 found that "a new port was not viable for a variety of technical, environmental and economic reasons", that the US was short US$72m in funds to cover the majority of the projected costs, and that private companies USAID had wanted to attract "had no interest in supporting the construction of a new port in northern Haiti".

=== Transportation ===
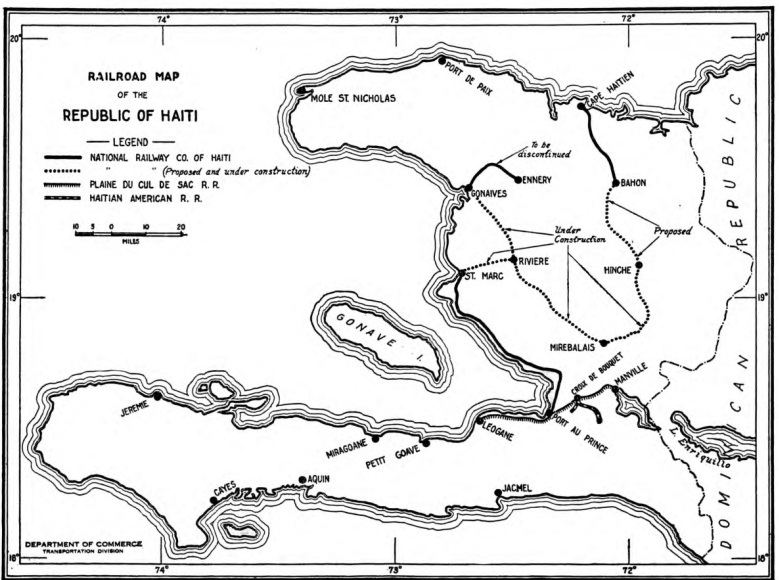
Rail map as of 1925

Haiti has two main highways that run from one end of the country to the other. The northern highway, Route Nationale No. 1 (National Highway One), originates in Port-au-Prince, winding through the coastal towns of Montrouis and Gonaïves, before reaching its terminus at the northern port Cap-Haïtien. The southern highway, Route Nationale No. 2, links Port-au-Prince with Les Cayes via Léogâne and Petit-Goâve. The state of roads is generally poor, many being potholed and becoming impassable in rough weather.

Port international de Port-au-Prince has more registered shipping than any of the other dozen ports in the country. The port's facilities include cranes, large berths, and warehouses, but these facilities are not in good condition. The port is underused, possibly due to the substantially high port fees. The port of Saint-Marc is currently the preferred port of entry for consumer goods.

In the past, Haiti used rail transport; however, the rail infrastructure was poorly maintained when in use and cost of rehabilitation is beyond the means of the Haitian economy. In 2018 the Regional Development Council of the Dominican Republic proposed a "trans-Hispaniola" railway between both countries.

==== Airports ====
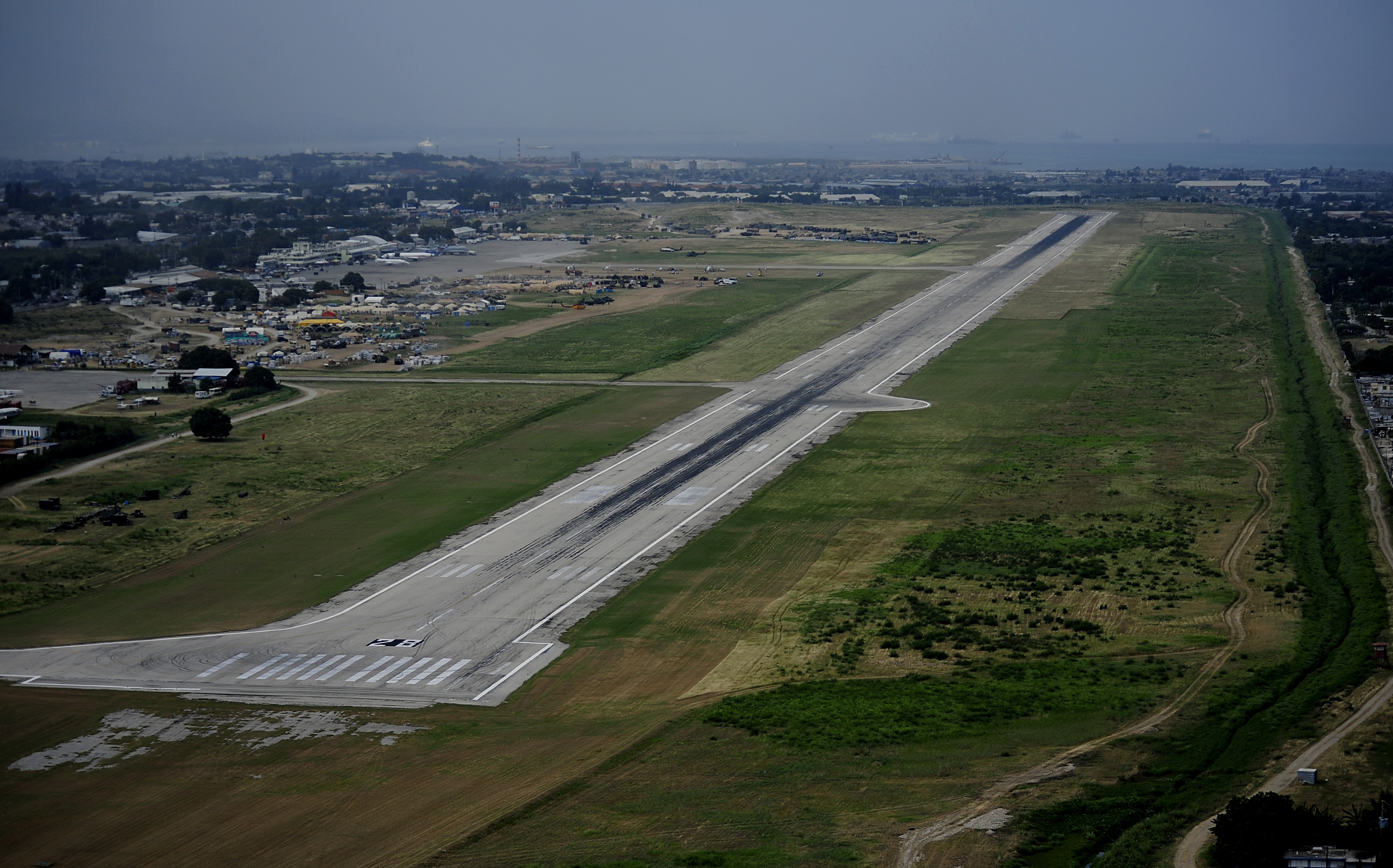
Toussaint Louverture International Airport

Toussaint Louverture International Airport, located ten kilometers (six miles) north-northeast of Port-au-Prince proper in the commune of Tabarre, is the primary hub for entry and exit into the country. It has Haiti's main jetway, and along with Cap-Haïtien International Airport handles the vast majority of the country's international flights. Cities such as Jacmel, Jérémie, Les Cayes, and Port-de-Paix have smaller, less accessible airports that are serviced by regional airlines and private aircraft.

In 2013, plans for the development of an international airport on Île-à-Vache were introduced by the prime minister.

In May 2024, the airport reopened following three months closure following violence, and is expected to help ease a shortage of medications and basic supplies.

==== Bus service ====
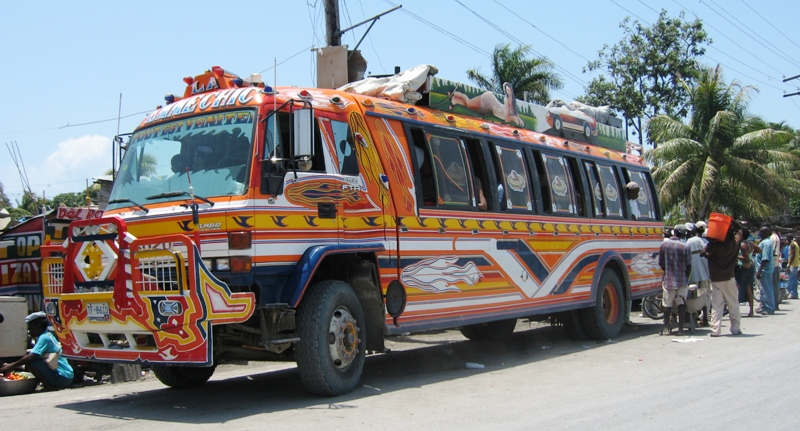
A "tap tap" bus in Port-Salut

Tap tap buses are colorfully painted buses or pick-up trucks that serve as shared taxis. The "tap tap" name comes from the sound of passengers tapping on the metal bus body to indicate they want to disembark. These vehicles for hire are often privately owned and extensively decorated. They follow fixed routes, do not leave until filled with passengers, and riders can usually disembark at any point. The decorations are a typically Haitian form of art.

=== Communications ===
Communications include the radio, television, fixed and mobile telephones, and the Internet. Haiti ranked last among North American countries in the World Economic Forum's Network Readiness Index (NRI) – an indicator for determining the development level of a country's information and communication technologies. Haiti ranked number 143 out of 148 overall in the 2014 NRI ranking, down from 141 in 2013.

=== Water supply and sanitation ===
Haiti faces key challenges in the water supply and sanitation sector. Access to these public services are very low, with 26% of Haitians having no access to improved water sources, and 7 out of 10 people lacking access to proper sanitation systems. Quality is inadequate, as public institutions remain very weak despite foreign aid and the government's declared intent to strengthen the sector's institutions. Foreign and Haitian NGOs play an important role in the sector, especially in rural and urban slum areas.

== Demographics ==
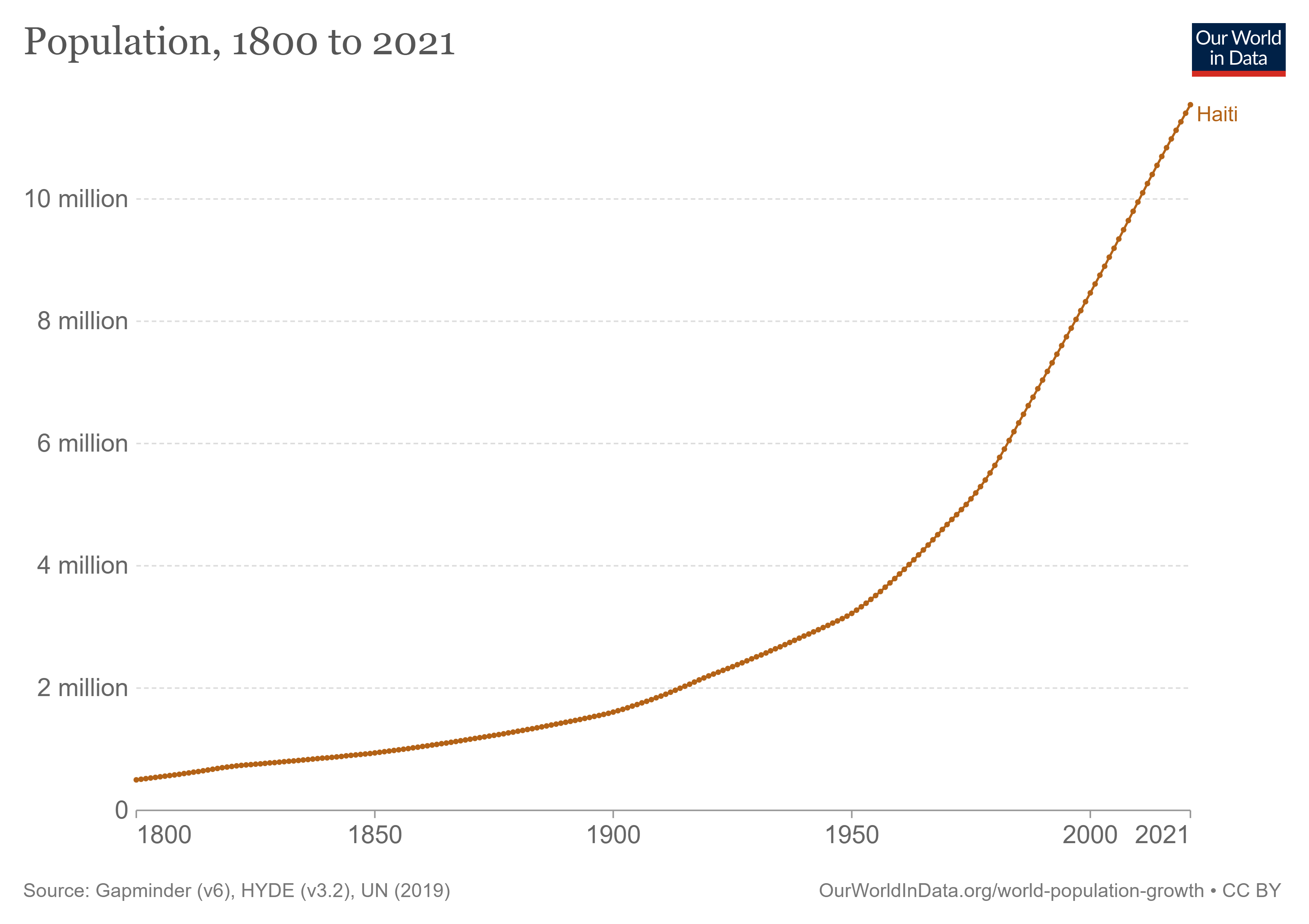
Haiti's population (1800–2021)

In 2018, Haiti's population was estimated to be about 10,788,000. In 2006, half of the population was younger than age 20. In 1950, the first formal census gave a total population of 3.1 million. Haiti averages approximately 350 people per square kilometer (910 people/mi^{2}), with its population concentrated most heavily in urban areas, coastal plains, and valleys.

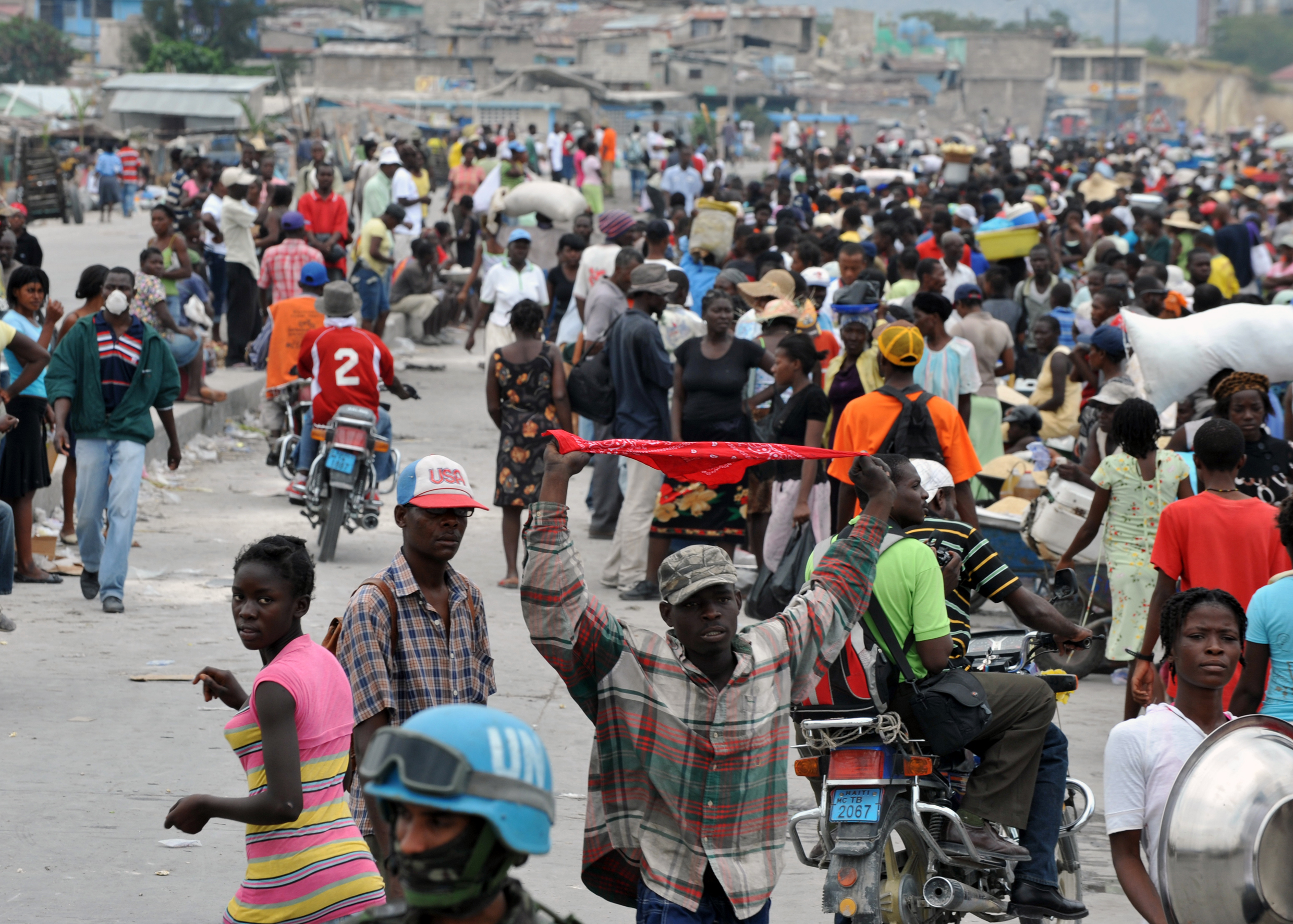
A street scene of Port-au-Princiens with a UN Peacekeeper of the Haiti mission

There is a large Haitian diaspora community, predominantly based in the United States, Canada, and France. Many others of Haitian descent live abroad in the Dominican Republic, Cuba, the Bahamas, the French Antilles, the Turks and Caicos, Jamaica, Puerto Rico, Venezuela, Brazil, Suriname and French Guiana. There were an estimated 881,500 people of Haitian ancestry in the United States in 2015, while in the Dominican Republic there were an estimated 800,000 in 2007. There were 300,000 in Cuba in 2013, 100,000 in Canada in 2006, 80,000 in Metropolitan France (2010), and up to 80,000 in the Bahamas (2009). Many influential early American settlers and black freemen, including Jean Baptiste Point du Sable and W. E. B. Du Bois, were of Haitian origin.

In 2018, the life expectancy at birth was 63.66 years.

=== Largest cities ===
Largest cities or towns in Haiti geonames.org
Rank	Name	Department	Pop.
1	Port-au-Prince	Ouest	1,234,742
2	Cap-Haïtien	Nord	534,815
3	Carrefour (in Metro P.P.)	Ouest	442,156
4	Delmas (in Metro P.P.)	Ouest	382,920
5	Pétion-Ville (in Metro P.P.)	Ouest	283,052
6	Port-de-Paix	Nord-Ouest	250,000
7	Croix des Bouquets (in Metro P.P.)	Ouest	229,127
8	Jacmel	Sud-Est	137,966
9	Léogâne	Ouest	134,190
10	Les Cayes	Sud	125,799

=== Racial discrimination ===
Under colonial rule, Haitian mulattoes were generally privileged above the black majority, though they possessed fewer rights than the white population. Following the country's independence, they became the nation's social elite. Numerous leaders throughout Haiti's history have been mulattoes. During this time, the enslaved persons and the affranchis were given limited opportunities toward education, income, and occupations, but even after gaining independence, the social structure remains a legacy today as the disparity between the upper and lower classes have not been reformed significantly since the colonial days. Making up 5% of the nation's population, mulattoes have retained their preeminence, evident in the political, economic, social and cultural hierarchy in Haiti. As a result, the elite class today consists of a small group of influential people who are generally light in color.

=== Languages ===
The two official languages of Haiti are French and Haitian Creole. French is the principal written and administratively authorized language (as well as the main language of the press) and is spoken by 42% of Haitians. It is spoken by all educated Haitians, is the medium of instruction in most schools, and is used in the business sector. It is also used in ceremonial events such as weddings, graduations and church Masses. Haiti is one of two independent nations in the Americas (along with Canada) to designate French as an official language; the other French-speaking areas are all overseas départements, or collectivités, of France, such as French Guiana. Haitian Creole is spoken by nearly all of the Haitian population. French, the base language for Haitian Creole, is popular among the Haitian elite and upper classes. French is also popular in the business sector, and to a far lesser degree, English due to American influence. Spanish is spoken by some Haitians who live along the Haitian-Dominican border. English and Spanish may also be spoken by Haitian deportees from the United States and various Latin American countries. Overall, about 90–95% of Haitians only speak Haitian Creole and French fluently, with over half only knowing Creole.

Haitian Creole, locally called Kreyòl, has recently undergone standardization and is spoken by virtually the entire population. One of the French-based creole languages, Haitian Creole has a vocabulary overwhelmingly derived from French, but its grammar resembles that of some West African languages. It also has influences from Taino, Spanish, and Portuguese. Haitian Creole is related to the other French creoles, and in particular to the Antillean and Louisiana Creole variants.

=== Religion ===
Religion in Haiti according to the Pew Research Center (2010)
1. Catholicism (56.8%)
2. Protestantism (29.6%)
3. Unaffiliated (10.6%)
4. Other (3.00%)

The 2018 CIA World Factbook reported that 55% of Haitians were Catholics and 29% were Protestants (Baptist 15.4%, Pentecostal 7.9%, Seventh-day Adventist 3%, Methodist 1.5%, other 0.7%). Other sources put the Protestant population higher, suggesting that it might have formed one-third of the population in 2001. Like other countries in the neighboring Latin American region, Haiti has witnessed a general Protestant expansion, which is largely Evangelical and Pentecostal in nature. Haitian Cardinal Chibly Langlois is president of the National Bishops Conference of the Catholic Church.

Vodou, a religion with West African roots similar to those of Cuba and Brazil, is formally practiced by 2.1% of the population; however, it is estimated that 50–80% of Haitians incorporate some elements of Vodou belief or practices into their religion, particularly with Catholicism. This reflects Vodou's colonial origins, when enslaved persons were obliged to disguise their traditional loa (lwa), or spirits, as Catholic saints, as part of a process called syncretism. As such, it is difficult to estimate the number of Vodouists in Haiti, especially given the legacy of historic persecution and misrepresentation in popular media and culture, as well as modern stigmatization among segments of the growing Protestant population. Nonetheless, Vodou was officially recognized by the Haitian government in 2003. Today, Vodou is experiencing somewhat of a resurgence with younger Haitians, and some are turning to Vodou to treat mental illness.

Reflecting the ubiquity of Vodou culture and beliefs, while many Catholics and Protestants in Haiti denounce Vodou as devil worship, they do not deny the power or existence of its spirits; rather, they are regarded as "evil" and "satanic" adversaries that require intervention through Christian prayer. Protestants view Catholic veneration of saints as idol worship, and some Protestants would often destroy statues and other Catholic paraphernalia.

Minority religions in Haiti include Islam, Bahá'í Faith, Judaism, and Buddhism.

=== Education ===
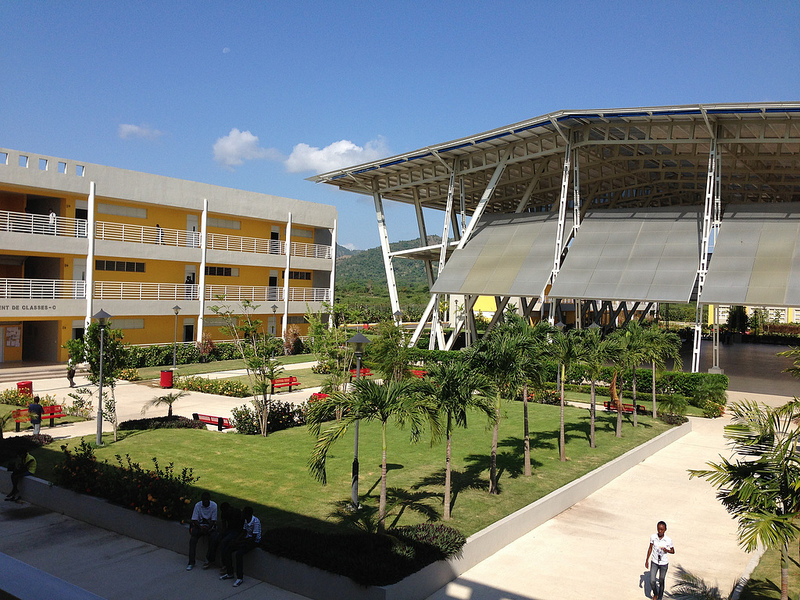
The Universite Roi Henri Christophe in Limonade

The educational system is based on the French system. Higher education, under the responsibility of the Ministry of Education, is provided by universities and other public and private institutions.

More than 80% of primary schools are privately managed by nongovernmental organizations, churches, communities, and for-profit operators, with minimal government oversight. According to the 2013 Millennium Development Goals Report, Haiti has steadily boosted net enrollment rate in primary education from 47% in 1993 to 88% in 2011, achieving equal participation of boys and girls in education. Charity organizations, including Food for the Poor and Haitian Health Foundation, are building schools for children and providing necessary school supplies. According to UNESCO, Haiti's adult literacy rate was 61.7% in 2022.

Many reformers have advocated the creation of a free, public and universal education system for all primary school-age students in Haiti. The Inter-American Development Bank estimates that the government will need at least US$3 billion to create an adequately funded system.

Upon successful graduation of secondary school, students may continue into higher education. The higher education schools include the University of Haiti. There are also medical schools and law schools offered at both the University of Haiti and abroad. Brown University is cooperating with L'Hôpital Saint-Damien to coordinate a pediatric health care curriculum.

=== Health ===
As of 2012, 60% of children under the age of 10 were vaccinated, compared to 93–95% in other countries. Recently there have been mass vaccination campaigns claiming to vaccinate as many as 91% of a target population against specific diseases (measles and rubella in this case). Most people have no transportation or access to Haitian hospitals.

The World Health Organization cites diarrheal diseases, HIV/AIDS, meningitis, and respiratory infections as common causes of death. Ninety percent of children suffer from waterborne diseases and intestinal parasites. HIV infection is found in 1.71% of Haiti's population (est. 2015). Per a 2017 report, incidence of tuberculosis is the highest in the region with an estimated 200 cases per 100,000 people. Approximately 30,000 Haitians fall ill with malaria each year.

Roughly 75% of households lack running water. Unsafe water, along with inadequate housing and unsanitary living conditions, contributes to the high incidence of infectious diseases. There is a chronic shortage of health care personnel and hospitals lack resources, a situation that became readily apparent after the January 2010 earthquake. The infant mortality rate in 2019 was 48.2 deaths per 1,000 live births, compared to 5.6 per 1,000 in the United States.

After the 2010 earthquake, Partners In Health founded the Hôpital Universitaire de Mirebalais, the largest solar-powered hospital in the world.

== Culture ==
Haiti has a lasting and unique cultural identity, blending traditional French and African customs, mixed with sizable acquirements from the Spanish and Indigenous cultures.

=== National holidays and festivals ===
The Haitian Carnival has been one of the most popular carnivals in the Caribbean. In 2010, the government decided to stage the event in a different city outside Port-au-Prince every year. The National Carnival follows the popular Jacmel Carnival, which takes place a week earlier in February or March.

Rara is a festival celebrated before Easter. The festival has generated a style of Carnival music.

=== Architecture ===
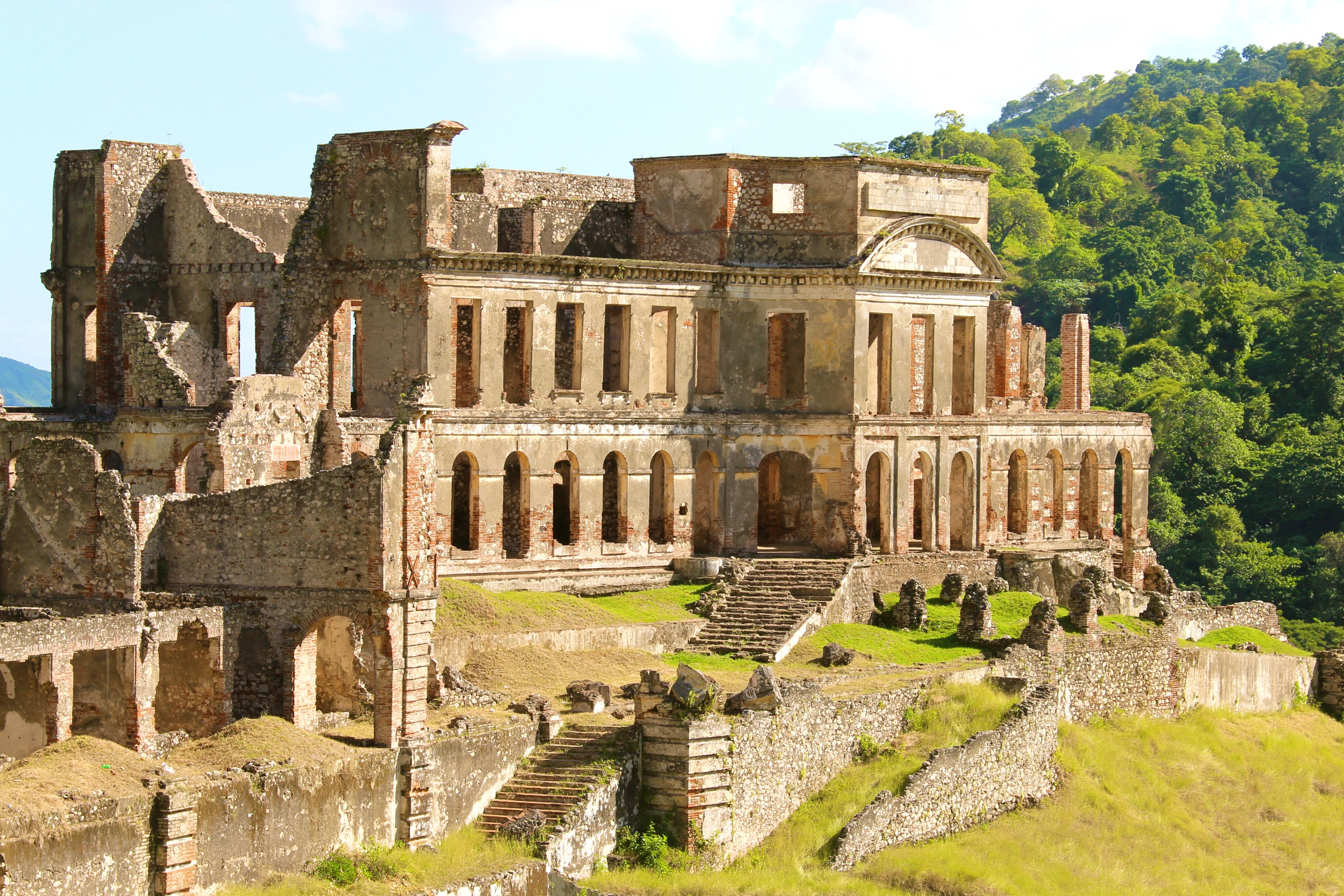
Sans-Souci Palace, National History Park, Haiti

Monuments include the Sans-Souci Palace and the Citadelle Laferrière, inscribed as a World Heritage Site in 1982. Situated in the Northern Massif du Nord, in the National History Park, the structures date from the early 19th century. The buildings were among the first built after Haiti's independence from France. The Citadelle Laferrière, the largest fortress in the Americas, is located in northern Haiti. It was built between 1805 and 1820 and is today referred to by some Haitians as the eighth wonder of the world.

The Institute for the Protection of National Heritage has preserved 33 historical monuments and the historic center of Cap-Haïtien.

Jacmel, a colonial city that was tentatively accepted as a World Heritage Site, was extensively damaged by the 2010 earthquake.

=== Museums ===
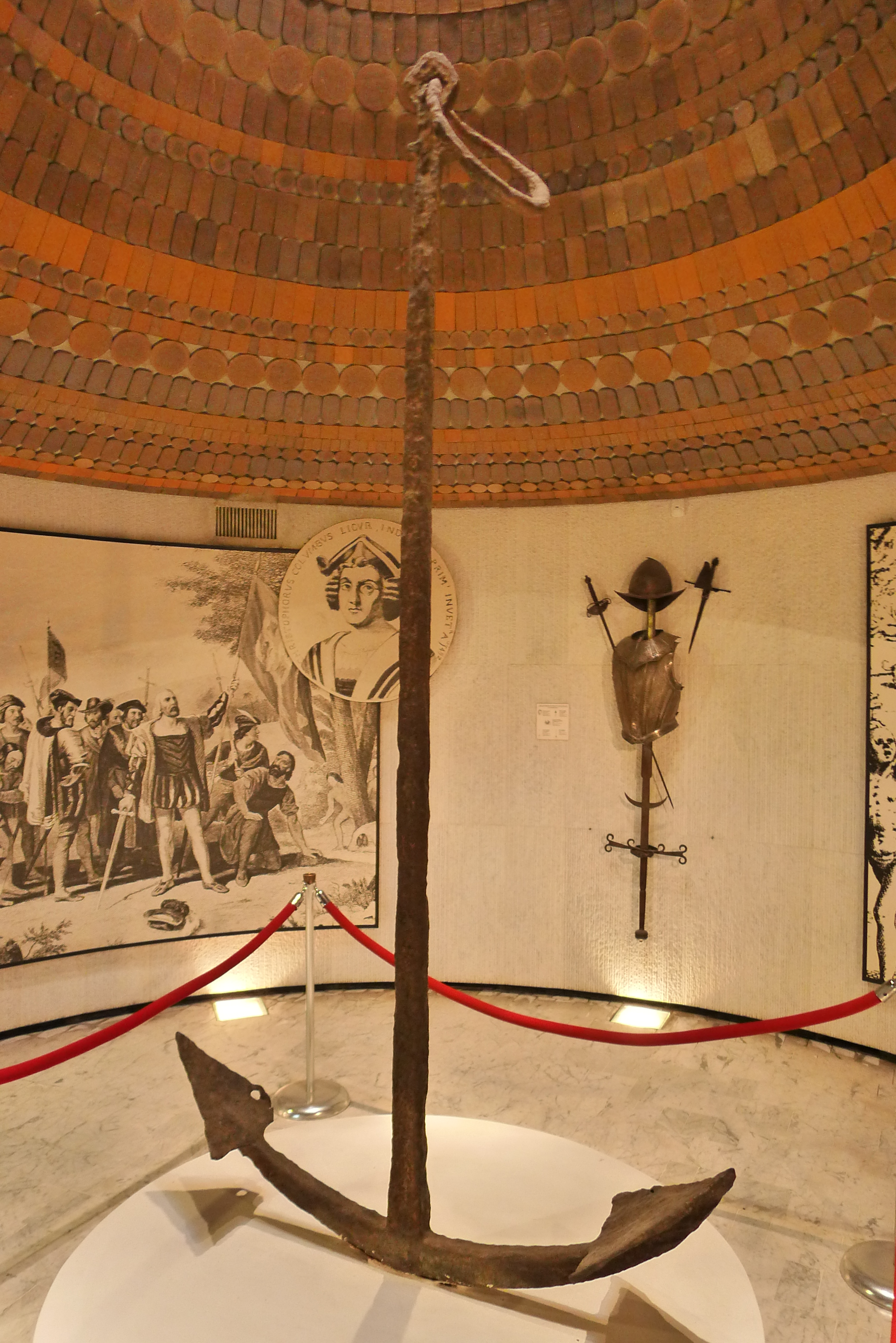
Santa María's anchor on display

The anchor of Christopher Columbus's largest ship, the Santa María rests in the Musée du Panthéon National Haïtien in Port-au-Prince.

=== Art ===
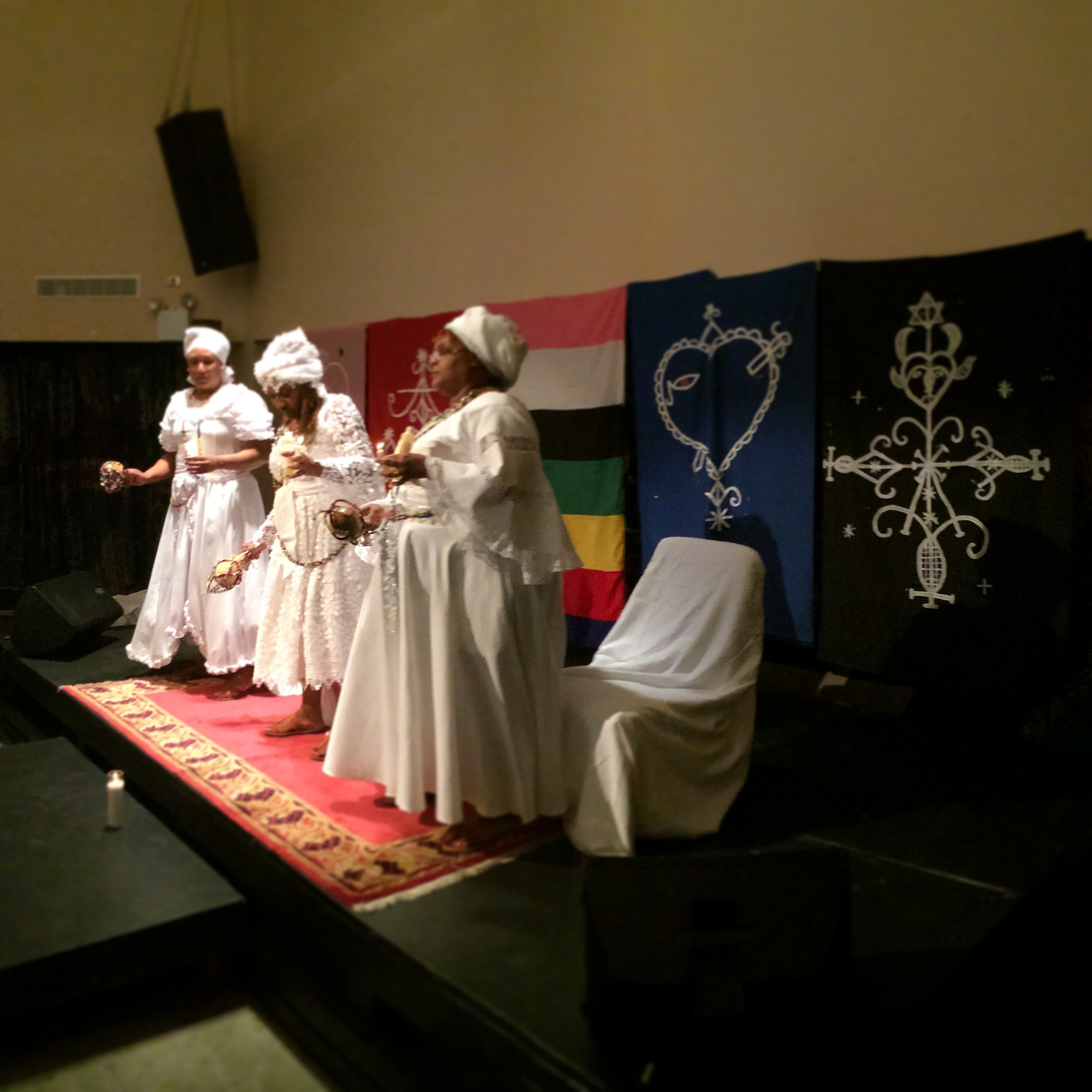
Swearing-in ceremony of Haitian Diaspora GwètòDe

Haitian art is distinctive, particularly through its paintings and sculptures. Brilliant colors, naïve perspectives, and sly humor characterize Haitian art. Frequent subjects in Haitian art include big, foods, landscapes, market activities, jungle animals, rituals, dances, and gods. As a result of a deep history and strong African ties, symbols take on great meaning within Haitian society. Many artists cluster in 'schools' of painting, such as the Cap-Haïtien school, which features depictions of daily life in the city, the Jacmel School, which reflects the steep mountains and bays of that coastal town, or the Saint-Soleil School, which is characterized by abstracted human forms and is heavily influenced by Vodou symbolism.

In the 1920s the indigéniste movement gained international acclaim, with its expressionist paintings inspired by Haiti's culture and African roots. Notable painters of this movement include Hector Hyppolite, Philomé Oban and Préfète Duffaut. Some notable artists of more recent times include Edouard Duval-Carrié, Frantz Zéphirin, Leroy Exil, Prosper Pierre Louis and Louisiane Saint Fleurant. Sculpture is also practiced in Haiti; noted artists in this form include George Liautaud and Serge Jolimeau.

=== Music and dance ===
Haitian music combines a wide range of influences drawn from the many people who have settled here. It reflects French, African and Spanish elements and others who have inhabited Hispaniola, and minor native Taino influences. Styles of music unique to Haitian culture include music derived from Vodou ceremonial traditions, Rara parading music, Twoubadou ballads, mini-jazz rock bands, Rasin movement, Hip hop kreyòl, méringue, and compas. Youth attend parties at nightclubs called discos, and attend Bal (ball, as in a formal dance).

Compas (konpa) is a complex, ever-changing music that arose from African rhythms and European ballroom dancing, mixed with Haiti's bourgeois culture. It is a refined music, with méringue as its basic rhythm. Haiti had no recorded music until 1937 when Jazz Guignard was recorded non-commercially.

=== Literature ===
Haiti has produced poetry, novels, and plays of international recognition. The French colonial experience established the French language as the venue of culture and prestige, and since then it has dominated the literary circles and the literary production. However, since the 18th century there has been a sustained effort to write in Haitian Creole. The recognition of Creole as an official language has led to an expansion of novels, poems, and plays in Creole. In 1975, Franketienne was the first to break with the French tradition in fiction with the publication of Dezafi, the first novel written entirely in Haitian Creole. Other well known Haitian authors include Jean Price-Mars, Jacques Roumain, Jacques Stephen Alexis, Marie Vieux-Chauvet, Pierre Clitandre, René Depestre, Edwidge Danticat, Lyonel Trouillot and Dany Laferrière.

=== Folklore and mythology ===
Haiti is known for its folklore traditions. Much of this is rooted in Haitian Vodou tradition. Belief in zombies is also common. Other folkloric creatures include the lougarou.

=== Cinema ===
Haiti has a small though growing cinema industry. Well-known directors working primarily in documentary film-making include Raoul Peck and Arnold Antonin. Directors producing fictional films include Patricia Benoît, Wilkenson Bruna and Richard Senecal.

=== Cuisine ===
Haiti is famous for its creole cuisine (related to Cajun cuisine), and its soup joumou.

=== Sports ===
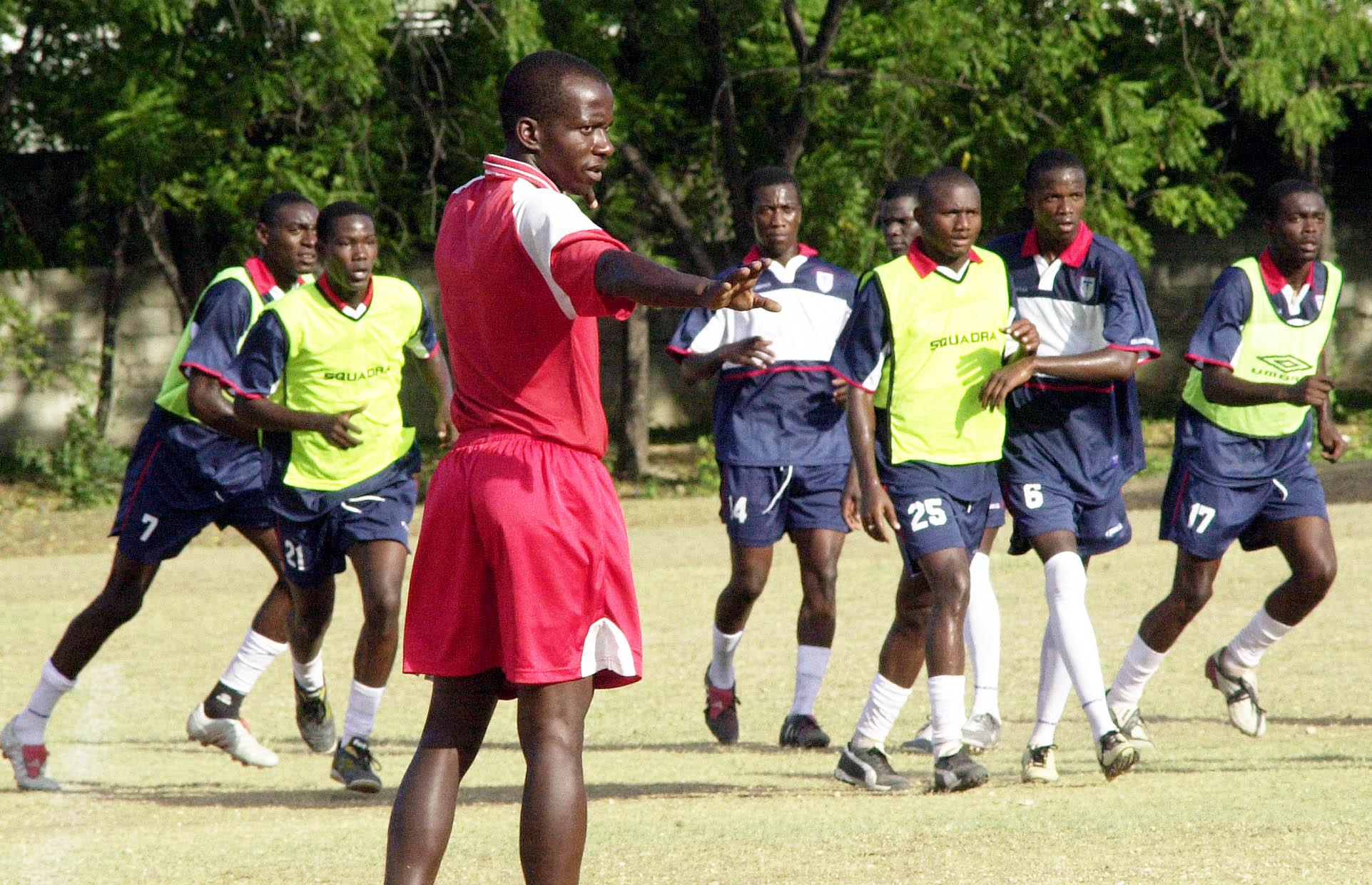
Haiti national football team training in Port-au-Prince, 2004

Football (soccer) is the most popular sport in Haiti with hundreds of small clubs competing at the local level. Basketball and baseball are growing in popularity. Stade Sylvio Cator is the multi-purpose stadium in Port-au-Prince, currently used mostly for association football matches. In 1974, the Haiti national football team were only the second Caribbean team to make the World Cup, returned to the tournament in 2026 after 52 years of absence. The national team won the 2007 Caribbean Nations Cup. The women's team also made the FIFA World Cup in 2023.

Haiti has participated in the Olympic Games since the year 1900 and won a number of medals. Haitian footballer Joe Gaetjens played for the United States national team in the 1950 FIFA World Cup, scoring the winning goal in the 1–0 upset of England.

== See also ==
- Outline of Haiti
- Madan Sara
- Devastations of Osorio
