= Outline of Haiti =

Country in the Caribbean on the island of Hispaniola

The Flag of Haiti

The Coat of arms of Haiti

The location of Haiti

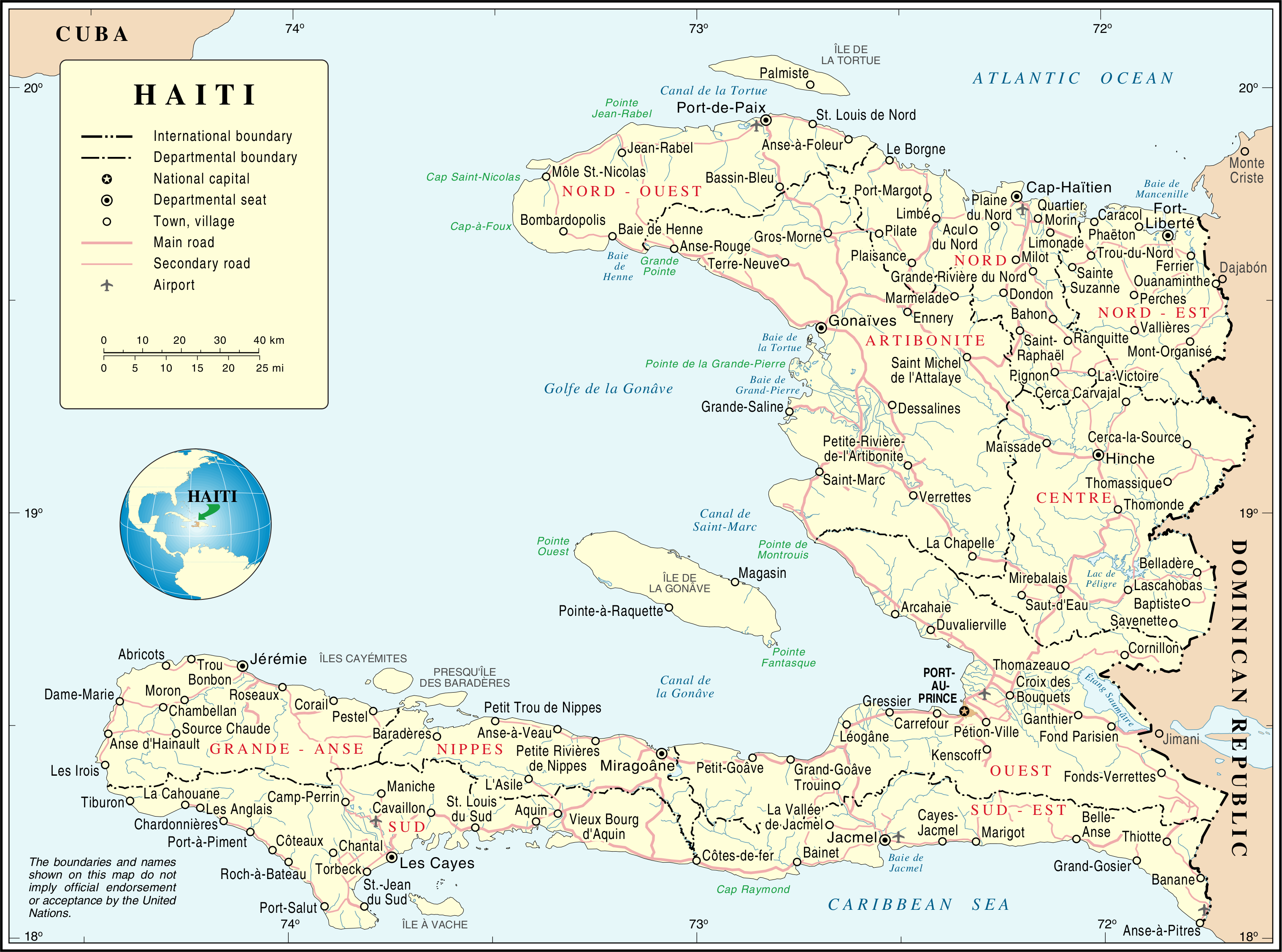
An enlargeable map of Haiti

The following outline is provided as an overview of and topical guide to Haiti:

Haiti – sovereign country located on the Caribbean island of Hispaniola in the Greater Antilles archipelago. Ayiti ("Land of Mountains") was the indigenous Taíno name for Hispaniola. The Haitian Creole and French-speaking country of Haiti occupies the western extent of Hispaniola, while the Spanish-speaking Dominican Republic occupies the greater eastern extent of the island. Haiti was the second country of the Americas to win its freedom from European colonization in 1804. The country's highest point is Pic la Selle, at 2,680 metres (8,793 ft). The total area of Haiti is 27,750 square kilometres (10,714 sq mi) and its capital is Port-au-Prince.

== General reference ==
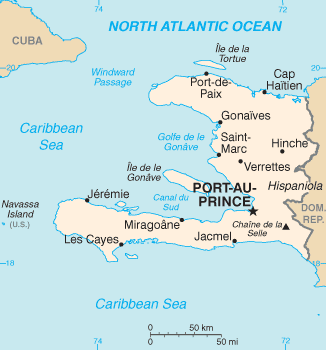
An enlargeable. basic map of Haiti

- Pronunciation: /ˈheɪti/
- Common English country name: Haiti
- Official English country name: The Republic of Haiti
- Common endonym(s):
- Official endonym(s):
- Adjectival(s): Haitian
- Demonym(s):
- Etymology: Name of Haiti
- ISO country codes: HT, HTI, 332
- ISO region codes: See ISO 3166-2:HT
- Internet country code top-level domain: .ht

== Geography of Haiti ==
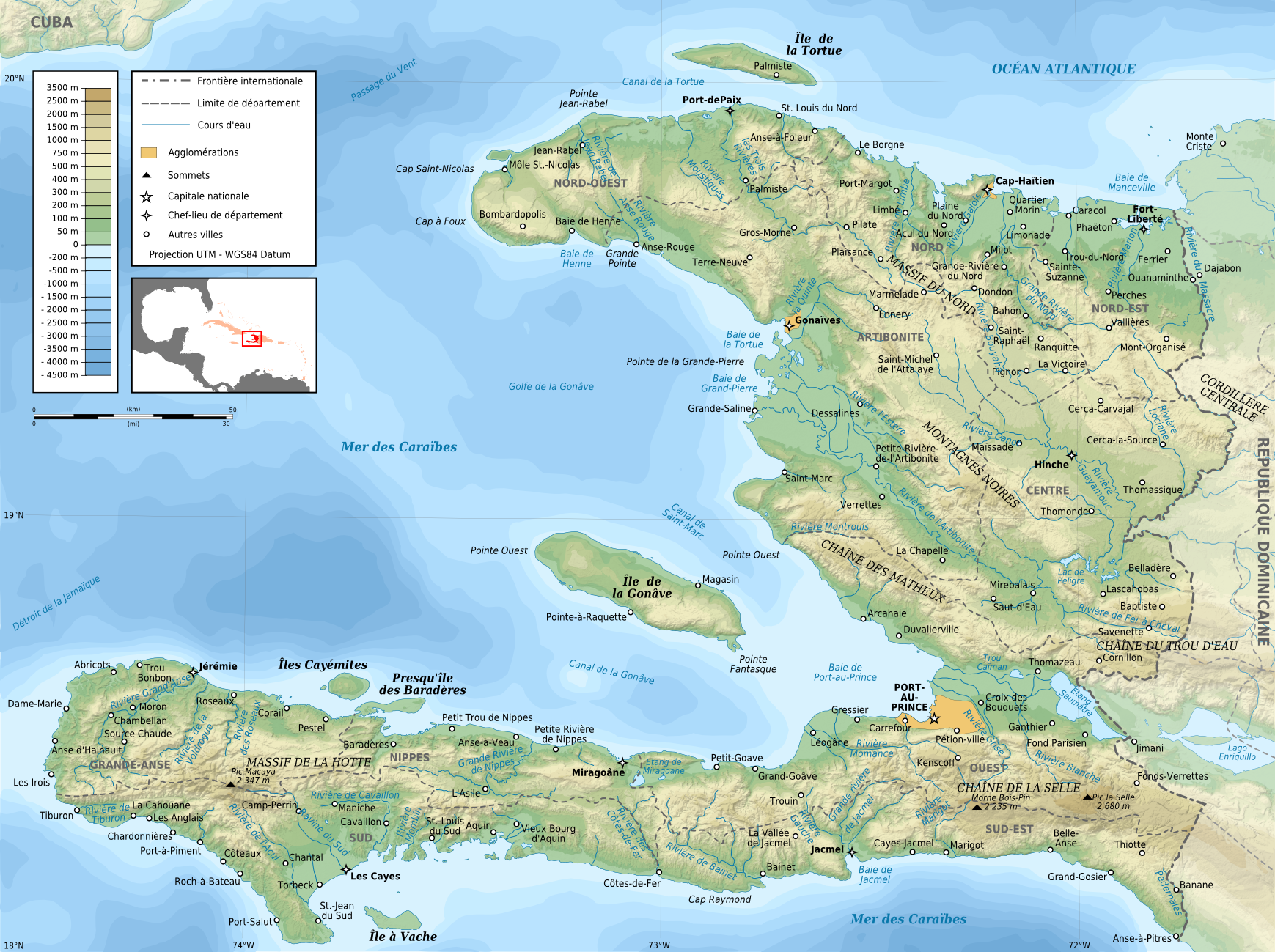
An enlargeable topographic map of Haiti

Geography of Haiti

- Haiti is: a country, on an island
- Location:
  - Northern Hemisphere and Western Hemisphere
    - North America (though not on the mainland)
  - Atlantic Ocean
    - North Atlantic
      - Caribbean
        - Antilles
          - Greater Antilles
            - Hispaniola, island (which Haiti shares with the Dominican Republic)
  - Time zone: UTC-05
  - Extreme points of Haiti
    - High: Pic la Selle 2,680 m (8,793 ft)
    - Low: Caribbean Sea 0 m
  - Land boundaries: Dominican Republic 360 km
  - Coastline: 1,771 km
- Population of Haiti: 9,598,000 - 83rd most populous country
- Area of Haiti: 27,750 km^{2}
- Atlas of Haiti

=== Environment of Haiti ===
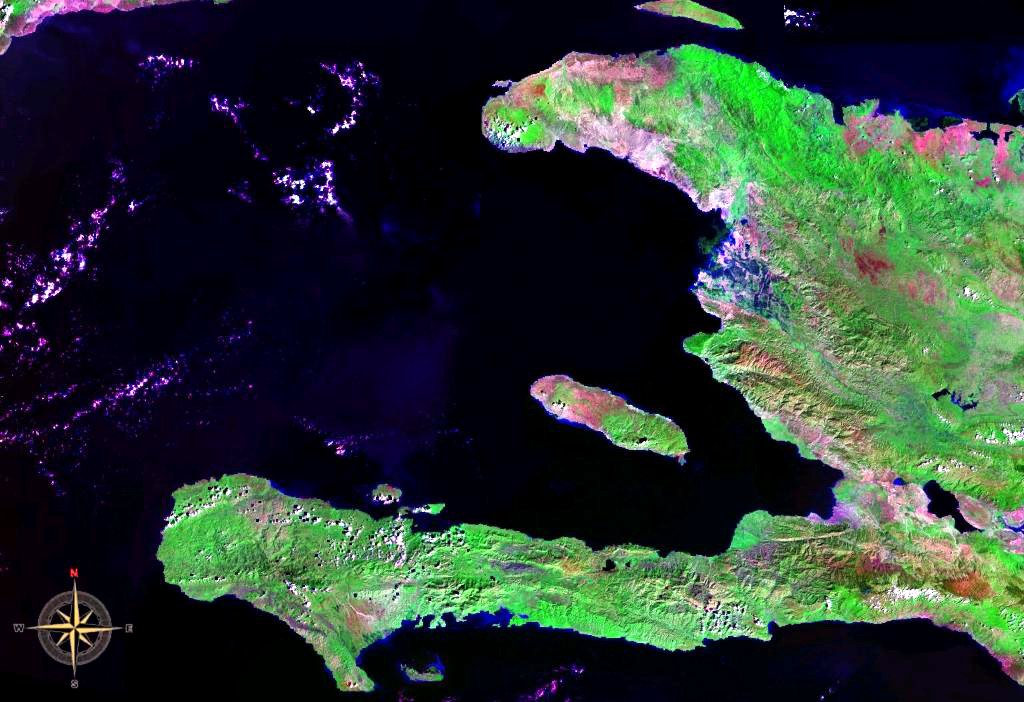
An enlargeable false colour satellite image of Haiti

Environment of Haiti

- Climate of Haiti
- Environmental issues in Haiti
- Renewable energy in Haiti
- Geology of Haiti
- Protected areas of Haiti
  - Biosphere reserves in Haiti
  - National parks of Haiti
- Wildlife of Haiti
  - Fauna of Haiti
    - Birds of Haiti
    - Mammals of Haiti

==== Natural geographic features of Haiti ====
- Fjords of Haiti
- Glaciers of Haiti
- Islands of Haiti
- Lakes of Haiti
- Mountains of Haiti
  - Volcanoes in Haiti
- Rivers of Haiti
  - Waterfalls of Haiti
- Valleys of Haiti
- World Heritage Sites in Haiti

=== Regions of Haiti ===
Regions of Haiti

==== Ecoregions of Haiti ====
List of ecoregions in Haiti

==== Administrative divisions of Haiti ====
Administrative divisions of Haiti

- Departments of Haiti
  - Arrondissements of Haiti
    - List of communes of Haiti

===== Departments of Haiti =====
Departments of Haiti

===== Arrondissements and communes of Haiti =====
Arrondissements and communes of Haiti

===== Municipalities of Haiti =====
- Capital of Haiti: Port-au-Prince
- Cities of Haiti

=== Demography of Haiti ===
Demographics of Haiti

== Government and politics of Haiti ==
Politics of Haiti

- Form of government: presidential republic
- Capital of Haiti: Port-au-Prince
- Elections in Haiti
- Political parties in Haiti

=== Branches of the government of Haiti ===
Government of Haiti

==== Executive branch of the government of Haiti ====
- Head of state: President of Haiti, Jovenel Moïse
- Head of government: Prime Minister of Haiti, Evans Paul
- Cabinet of Haiti
- Haiti

==== Legislative branch of the government of Haiti ====
- National Assembly of Haiti (bicameral)
  - Upper house: Senate of Haiti
  - Lower house: Chamber of Deputies of Haiti

==== Judicial branch of the government of Haiti ====
Court system of Haiti

- Supreme Court of Haiti

=== Foreign relations of Haiti ===
Foreign relations of Haiti

- Diplomatic missions in Haiti
- Diplomatic missions of Haiti

==== International organization membership ====
International organization membership of Haiti The Republic of Haiti is a member of:

- African, Caribbean, and Pacific Group of States (ACP)
- Agency for the Prohibition of Nuclear Weapons in Latin America and the Caribbean (OPANAL)
- Caribbean Community and Common Market (Caricom)
- Caribbean Development Bank (CDB)
- Food and Agriculture Organization (FAO)
- Group of 77 (G77)
- Inter-American Development Bank (IADB)
- International Atomic Energy Agency (IAEA)
- International Bank for Reconstruction and Development (IBRD)
- International Civil Aviation Organization (ICAO)
- International Criminal Court (ICCt) (signatory)
- International Criminal Police Organization (Interpol)
- International Development Association (IDA)
- International Federation of Red Cross and Red Crescent Societies (IFRCS)
- International Finance Corporation (IFC)
- International Fund for Agricultural Development (IFAD)
- International Hydrographic Organization (IHO)
- International Maritime Organization (IMO)
- International Monetary Fund (IMF)
- International Olympic Committee (IOC)
- International Organization for Migration (IOM)
- International Red Cross and Red Crescent Movement (ICRM)
- International Telecommunication Union (ITU)
- International Telecommunications Satellite Organization (ITSO)
- International Trade Union Confederation (ITUC)
- Latin American Economic System (LAES)
- Multilateral Investment Guarantee Agency (MIGA)
- Nonaligned Movement (NAM)
- Organisation internationale de la Francophonie (OIF)
- Organisation for the Prohibition of Chemical Weapons (OPCW)
- Organization of American States (OAS)
- Permanent Court of Arbitration (PCA)
- Union Latine
- United Nations (UN)
- United Nations Conference on Trade and Development (UNCTAD)
- United Nations Educational, Scientific, and Cultural Organization (UNESCO)
- United Nations Industrial Development Organization (UNIDO)
- Universal Postal Union (UPU)
- World Confederation of Labour (WCL)
- World Customs Organization (WCO)
- World Federation of Trade Unions (WFTU)
- World Health Organization (WHO)
- World Intellectual Property Organization (WIPO)
- World Meteorological Organization (WMO)
- World Tourism Organization (UNWTO)
- World Trade Organization (WTO)

=== Law and order in Haiti ===
Law of Haiti

- Constitution of Haiti
- Crime in Haiti
  - Prostitution in Haiti
- Human rights in Haiti
  - Women's rights in Haiti
  - LGBT rights in Haiti
  - Freedom of religion in Haiti
- Law enforcement in Haiti

=== Military of Haiti ===
Military of Haiti

- Command
  - Commander-in-chief: Jean Joseph Exume (as Minister of Justice & Public Security)
    - Ministry of Justice & Public Security
- Forces
  - Haitian National Police
- Military history of Haiti
- Military ranks of Haiti

=== Local government in Haiti ===
Departments of Haiti

Departments of Haiti

1. Artibonite
2. Centre
3. Grand'Anse
4. Nippes
5. Nord
6. Nord-Est
7. Nord-Ouest
8. Ouest
9. Sud
10. Sud-Est

== History of Haiti ==
History of Haiti

- Timeline of the history of Haiti
- Current events of Haiti
- Military history of Haiti

== Culture of Haiti ==
Culture of Haiti

- Architecture of Haiti
- Cuisine of Haiti
- Dance in Haiti
- Festivals in Haiti
- Languages of Haiti
- Media in Haiti
- National Museum of Haiti
- National Palace
- National symbols of Haiti
  - Coat of arms of Haiti
  - Flag of Haiti
  - National anthem of Haiti
- People of Haiti
- Prostitution in Haiti
- Public holidays in Haiti
- Records of Haiti
- Religion in Haiti
  - Baháʼí Faith in Haiti
  - Christianity in Haiti
  - Haitian Vodou
  - Islam in Haiti
  - Judaism in Haiti
- World Heritage Sites in Haiti

=== Art in Haiti ===
- Art in Haiti
- Cinema of Haiti
- Literature of Haiti
- Music of Haiti
- Dance in Haiti
- National Museum of Art, Haiti
- Television in Haiti
- Theatre in Haiti

=== Sports in Haiti ===
Sports in Haiti

- Football in Haiti
- Haiti at the Olympics

== Economy and infrastructure of Haiti ==
Economy of Haiti

- Economic rank, by nominal GDP (2007): 135th (one hundred and thirty fifth)
- Agriculture in Haiti
- Banking in Haiti
  - Central Bank of Haiti
- Communications in Haiti
  - Internet in Haiti
- Companies of Haiti
- Currency of Haiti: Gourde
  - ISO 4217: HTG
- Energy in Haiti
  - Energy policy of Haiti
  - Oil industry in Haiti
- Health care in Haiti
- Mining in Haiti
- Haiti Stock Exchange
- Tourism in Haiti
- Transport in Haiti
  - Airports in Haiti
  - Rail transport in Haiti
  - Roads in Haiti
- Water supply and sanitation in Haiti

== Education in Haiti ==
Education in Haiti

== Health in Haiti ==
Health in Haiti

== See also ==
Haiti

- List of international rankings
- Member state of the United Nations
- Outline of geography
- Outline of North America
- Outline of the Caribbean
