= Wildlife of Haiti =

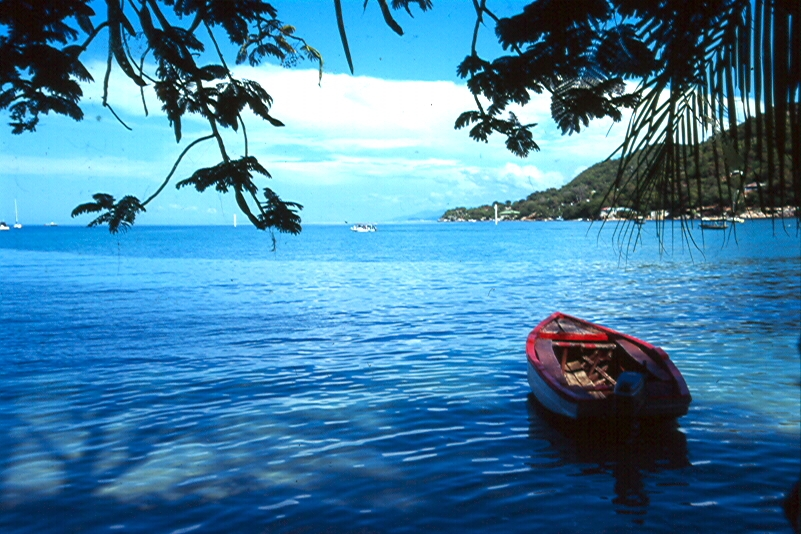
Labadee beach, Haïti, close to Cap-Haïtien

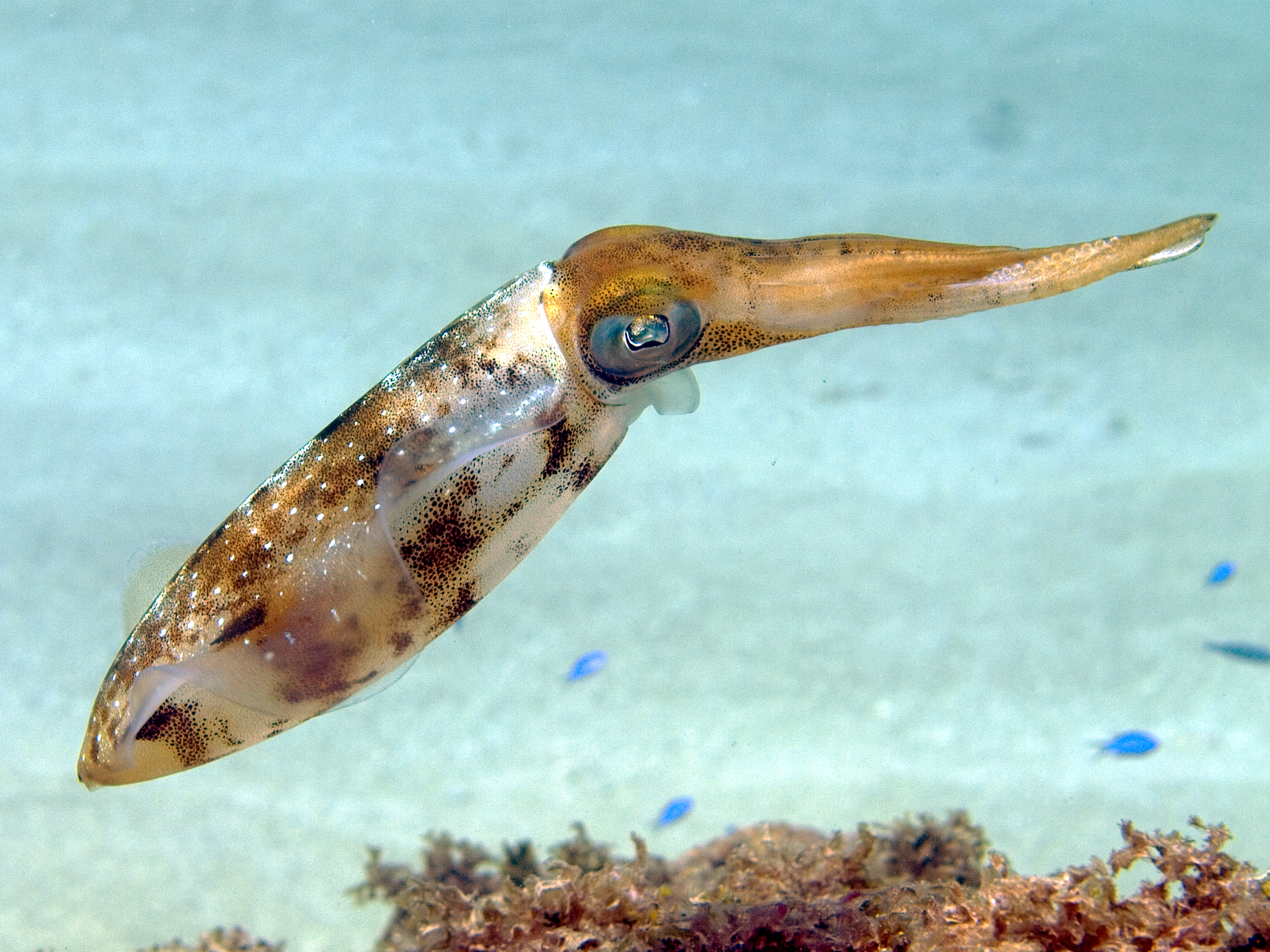
Sepioteuthis sepioidea (Caribbean reef squid). La Fague, Cap-Haitien

The wildlife of Haiti is important to the country because of its biodiversity. According to the World Conservation Monitoring Centre, Haiti is considered to be "one of the most biologically significant countries of the West Indies". With an estimated 5,600 plant species on the island of Hispaniola, some of which only occur in Haiti, 36% are considered as endemic to the island. A mountainous country, it is situated in the western three-eighths of Hispaniola and shares a border with the Dominican Republic. There are nine life zones, from low desert to high cloud forests, as well as four mountain ranges, and hundreds of rivers and streams and the coral reefs in the seas that surround the islands. Issues of environmental damage, expanding population, deforestation and erosion are of concern; less than 2% of the original forest remains on account of deforestation. This degradation is traced from the 17th century to 19th century starting with the French colonization of Haiti and the population explosion during the 20th century, which for the purpose of forestry and sugar-related industries, degraded the forests. and the environment.

== Geography ==
The features of the island terrain (generally mountainous) vary from the Caribbean Sea elevation of 0 metres (0 ft) to the highest point on the Chaine de la Selle, at 2,680 metres (8,790 ft). The land use distribution reported is of arable land 36.04%, permanent crops 10.09% and others 53.87%, with an irrigated area of 97,000 ha. The Massif de la Hotte (of 2.5 million years' age) is part of the far-southwestern mountain range of the island, has a few vestiges of cloud forests (within Pic Macaya National Park) which are known for endemic plant and reptile species. The grey-crowned palm-tanager is one of the rare endemic bird species here.

The climate is tropical; mountains in the east cut off trade winds and cause semiarid conditions in some areas. The average annual precipitation is 1,461 millimetres (57.5 in), which varies with topography and wind direction. Hispaniola lies within the Main Development Region for tropical cyclone activity; hence Haiti experiences severe storms from June to November. Occasional floods and earthquakes also occur, and in some years droughts are experienced.

== Protected areas ==
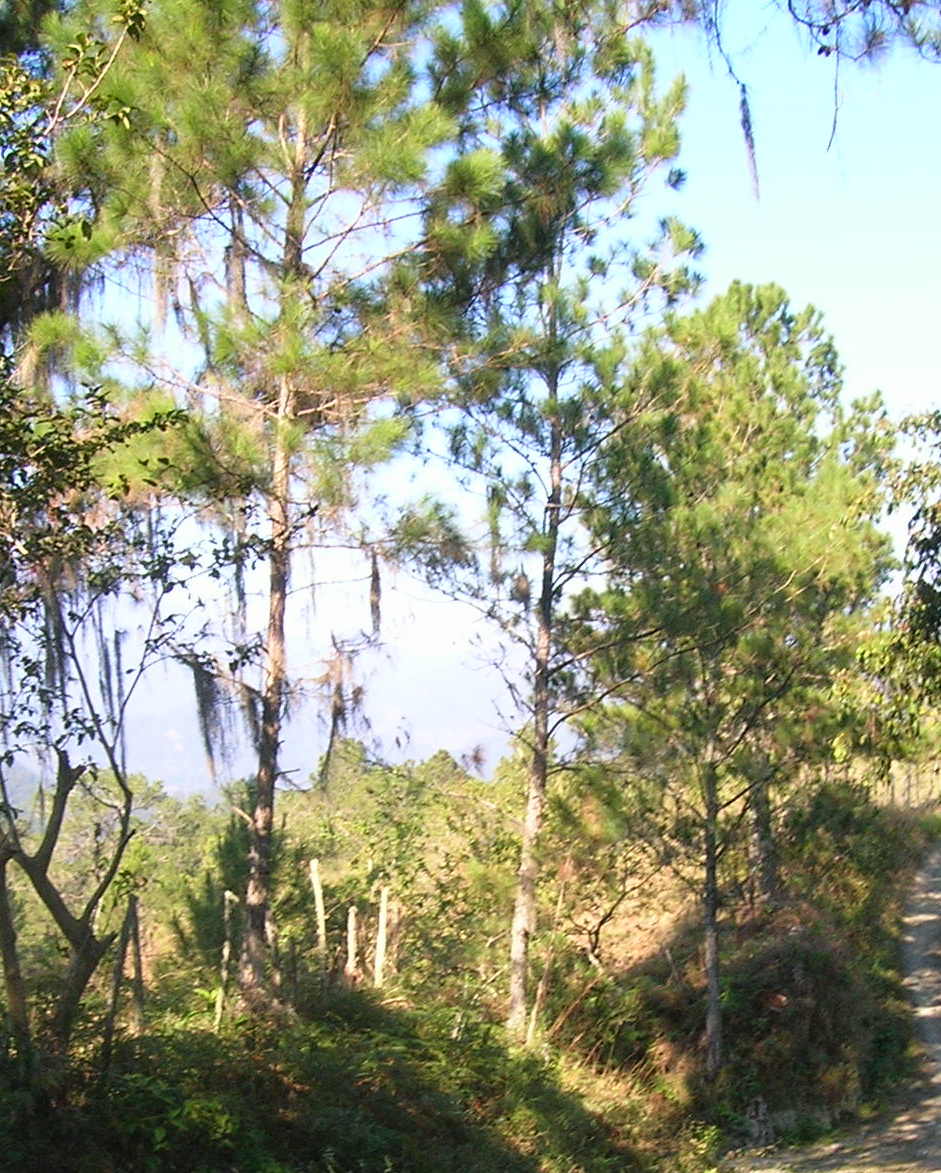
Pinus occidentalis

The regions of extreme biodiversity in Haiti have been brought under the law (by legal enactment of June 23, 1983) of protection and preservation of the ecology and the biodiversity of the identified areas. These regions have been declared national parks, and specifically the two large gazetted national parks are the Morne La Visite National Park as part of the Massif de La Selle (mountain range) and Pic Macaya National Park in the Massif de la Hotte (hill massif) is also an integral part. Apart from the major aspect of conservation of plants and animals in general, the park administration are also entrusted with the task of preserving the endangered species of mammals such as Plagiodontia aedium and Solenodon paradoxus. In addition there are two other parks the Pine Forest National Park, in the eastern Massif de la Selle, and the Historic Citadel National Park in the Massif du Nord. In these four parks no hunting, illegal logging and transfer of land for any development activity are allowed; however, enforcement of the laws has not been stringent due inadequate funding for maintenance and security arrangements. However, visitors are allowed to see the wildlife, the waterfalls and the general rain forest vistas in these parks.

While the four national parks protect an area of 25,000 hectares (62,000 acres), there are proposals on the anvil to bring 18 more areas of the country under protective cover which encompass an area of another 23,000 hectares (57,000 acres).

=== La Visite National Park ===
La Visite National Park covers an area of 2,000 hectares (4,900 acres) (established in 1983) along the ridge of the Massif de la Selle range between the hill peaks of Morne d'Enfer (elevation 1,900 metres (6,200 ft)) and Morne Kadenau (2,155 metres (7,070 ft)) with the highest mountain of Pic Cabayo lying within the park rising to an elevation 2,130 metres (6,990 ft). It is at distance of 45 kilometres (28 mi) to the south of Port-au-Prince. According to the floristic survey carried out by Walter S. Judd of the University of Florida, the plants recorded in the park are 326 species of tracheophytes that includes 262 species of angiosperms, 76 species of mosses, 19 species of liverworts. In addition, the vascular plant species reported are 112 of which 32% are endemic species to Haiti. A reforestation programme has been undertaken since 2011 under which 300,000 seedlings were under planting in memory of the 300,000 people who perished in Haiti in the earthquake of 12 January 2010.

=== Pic Macaya National Park ===
The Pic Macaya National Park, on the southern peninsula, which is 198 kilometres (123 mi) from Port-au-Prince and 36 kilometres (22 mi) to the northwest of Les Cayes, has a designated area of 5,500 hectares (14,000 acres) that includes a ravine formation located between the mountain peaks of Pic Formon (2,219 metres (7,280 ft)) and Pic Macaya (2,347 metres (7,700 ft)). The park receives an annual average rainfall of 4,000 millimetres (160 in). The Rivere Ravine Sud rises from these mountains and flows through the park. Karst limestone formations and agricultural areas are also part of the park. There are two major types of vegetation in the park – the wet forests on limestone formations (in an elevation range of 800-1200m), and the cloud forest combined with pine forest including endemic plant species. The largest broad leaf trees are of pine some of which are 45 metres (148 ft) in height. Detailed floristic surveys have recorded 470 species of tracheophytes, which include 367 species of anglosperms, 99 species of mosses, 63 species of liver worts. In addition, the vascular plant species reported are 136, of which 29% are endemic to Haiti. Orchids are also found in large numbers. Other wildlife consists of birds and amphibians which are mostly endemic. The most productive agricultural lands of the Plaine de Cayes are within the park area. The park has many trekking paths including to the mountain trek to peak Pic Macaya (2,347 metres (7,700 ft)).

== Coral reefs ==
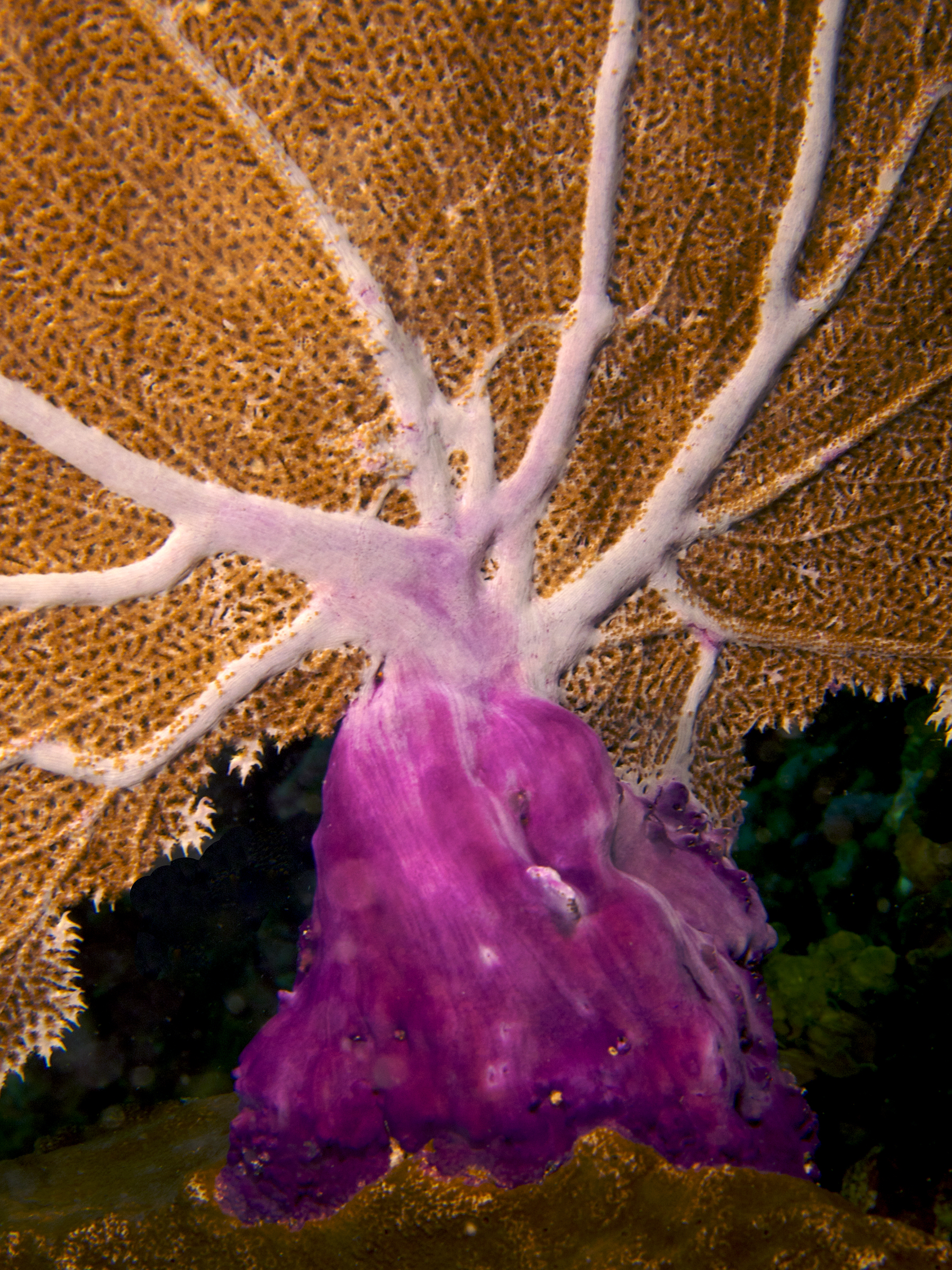
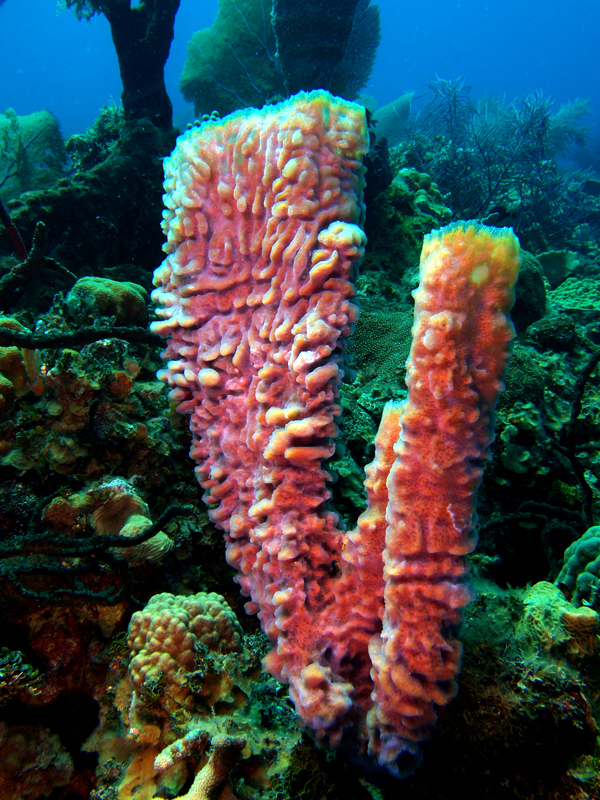
Left: Gorgonia ventalina (purple gorgonian seafan); right: Callyspongia plicifera (azure vase sponge)

Coral reefs in Haiti cover a stretch of 1,000 kilometres (620 mi) of coast. While it is assessed that the coral reefs are over exploited for fishing, with elkhorn coral put on the US Endangered Species List, the reef structure is stated to be stable and the living coral are generally occupy 10% of reefs, and algae and sponge cover about 50%. The fish habitat hosts Caribbean fish species and invertebrate species with the reef structure providing the needed habitat. Use of fish trap, fishing net, spear or line fisherman with their paddle or sailboats are a common sight along the coral reefs. In order to bring the fish yield from the coral reefs to the level of 35 tons per km^{2} noted in other coral reef regions of the world, the MacArthur Foundation has initiated a project in Haiti to enhance fish production, from its present meager level, through a network of marine protected areas. The project also envisages inculcating knowledge to the Haitians on the economic potential and the need to also monitor the reefs.

Some of the underwater species are 35 species of hard corals in the reefs, 55 species of sponges, 12 gorgonians.

== Flora ==
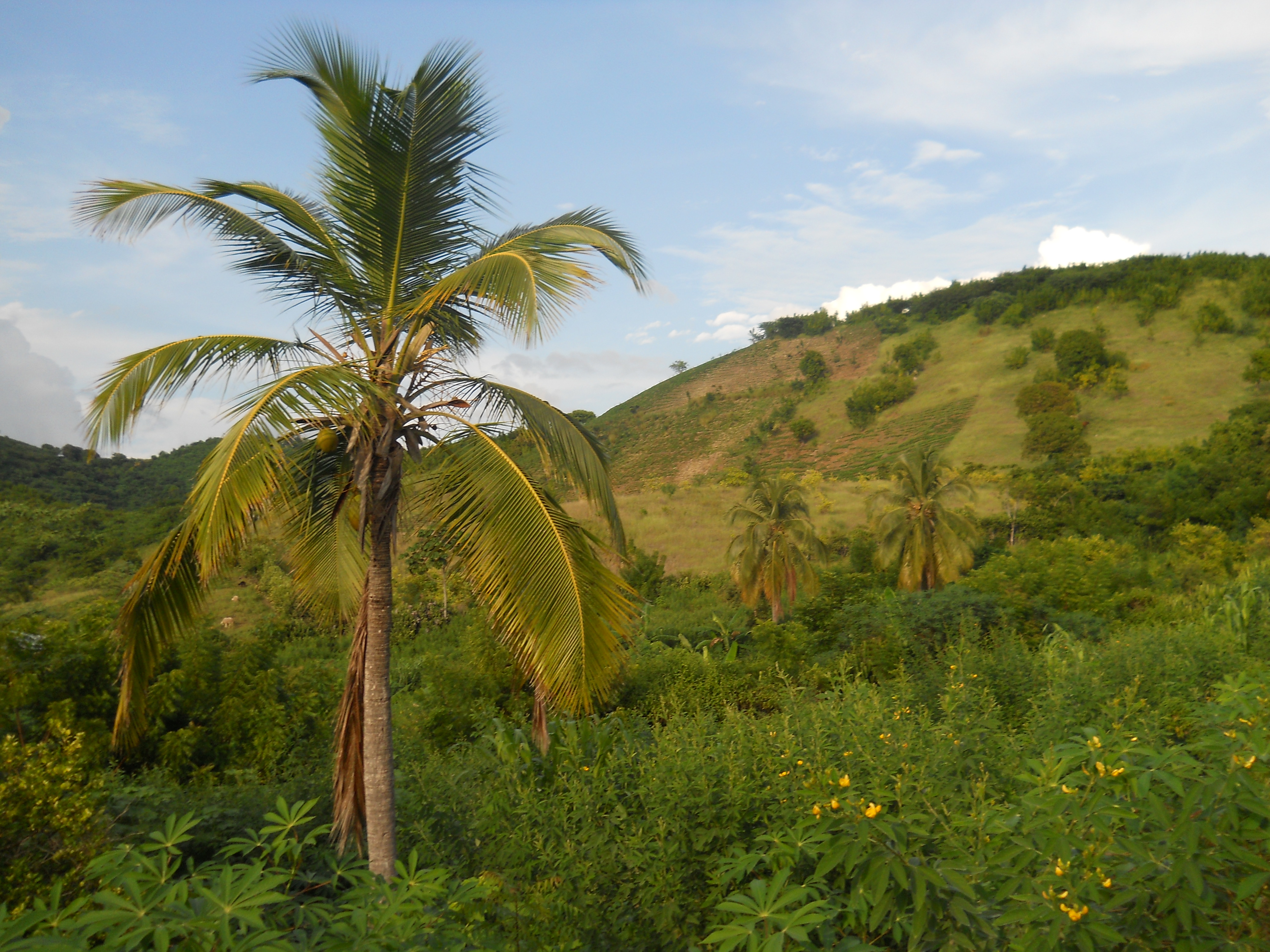
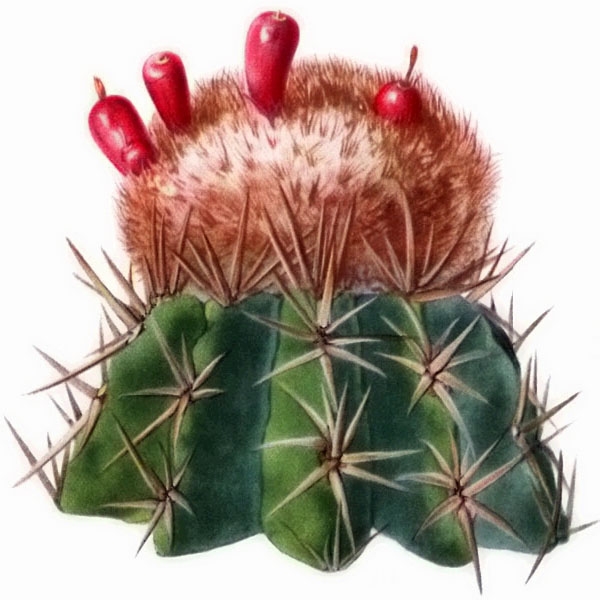
Left: Zanglais, Haiti; right: Melocactus lemairei

The ecoregions of Haiti include the Hispaniolan moist forests (about 200 square kilometres (77 sq mi) only of undisturbed rainforest), Hispaniolan dry forests, Hispaniolan pine forests (in parts of the two national parks), Enriquillo wetlands (remnants of an old marine channel), and Greater Antilles mangroves which cover an area of only 134 square kilometres (52 sq mi). Giant tree ferns, orchids, bayahondes (a variety of mesquite) on the hill slopes, cacti, acacias, and thorny woods on the dry plains, and mangrove forests on the coast line.

The nation has 300 orchids and 600 fern species. Mahogany, rose wood and cedar are some of the trees that still exist at higher altitudes.

== Fauna ==
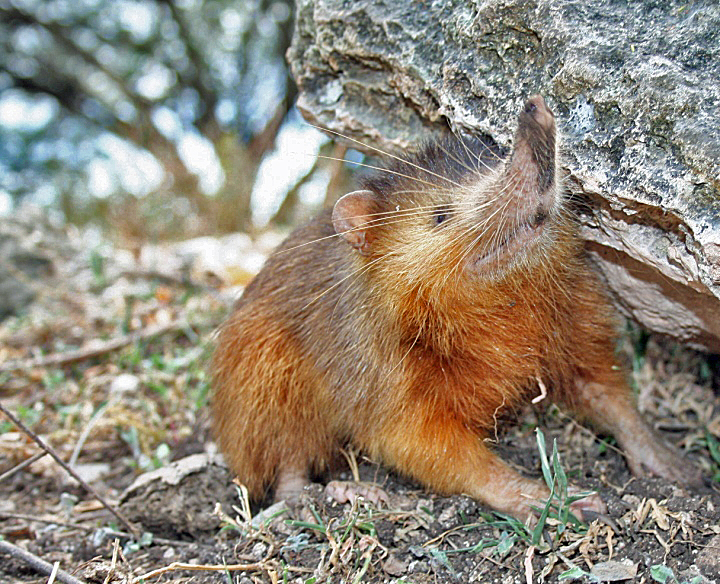
Hispaniolan solenodon

=== Threatened species ===
In the Massif de la Hotte alone there are 42 globally threatened mammals, birds, reptiles and amphibians. The coastal zone ecosystem has been fairly well preserved and has coral reefs, mangrove forests and estuaries. Coral reefs are not part of the national parks. There are 38 species under the threatened and endangered list and some of them may have been extirpated too. Of these, nearly 50% are endemic and threatened with extinction and three are critically threatened. The critically endangered species are black-capped petrel, Ridgway's hawk (also endemic), stygian owl, and western chat-tanager and eastern chat-tanager, both endemic.

=== Avifauna ===
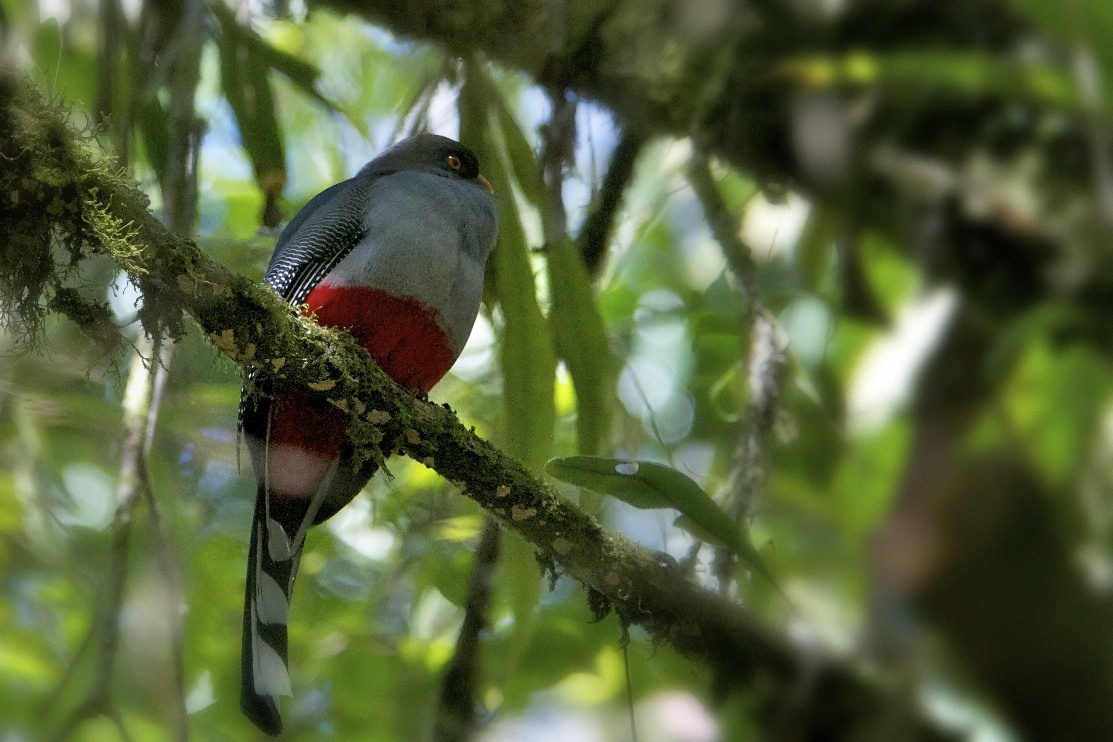
Hispaniolan trogon (Priotelus roseigaster), national bird of Haiti

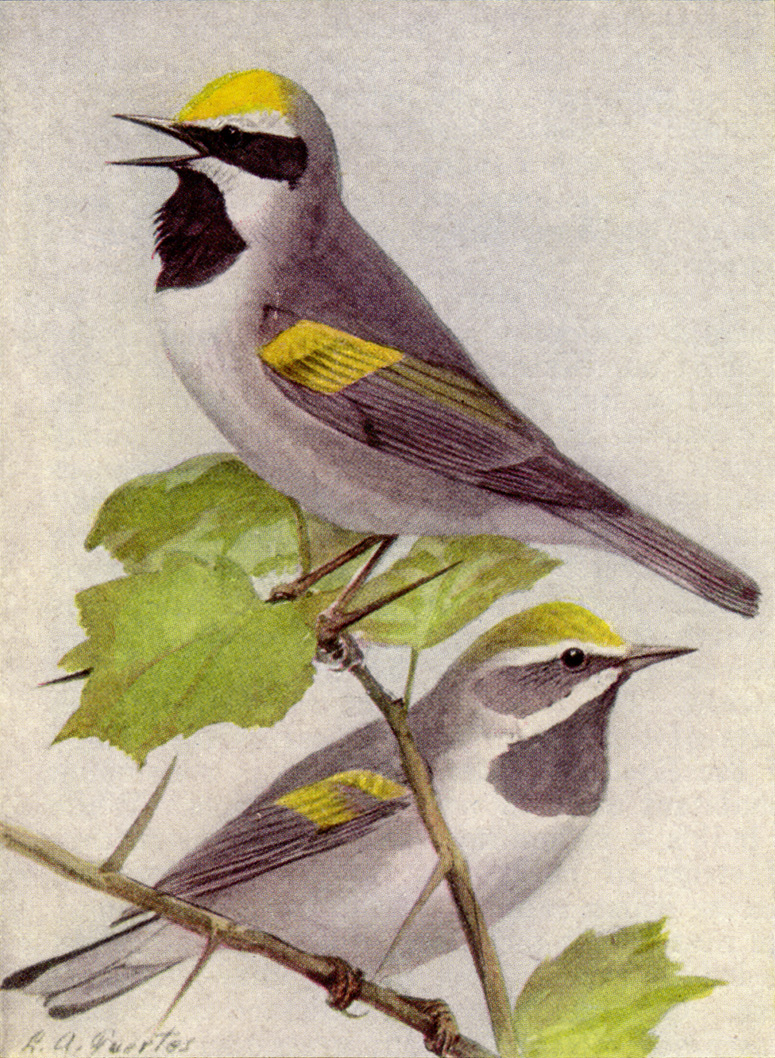
Golden-winged warbler (NT)

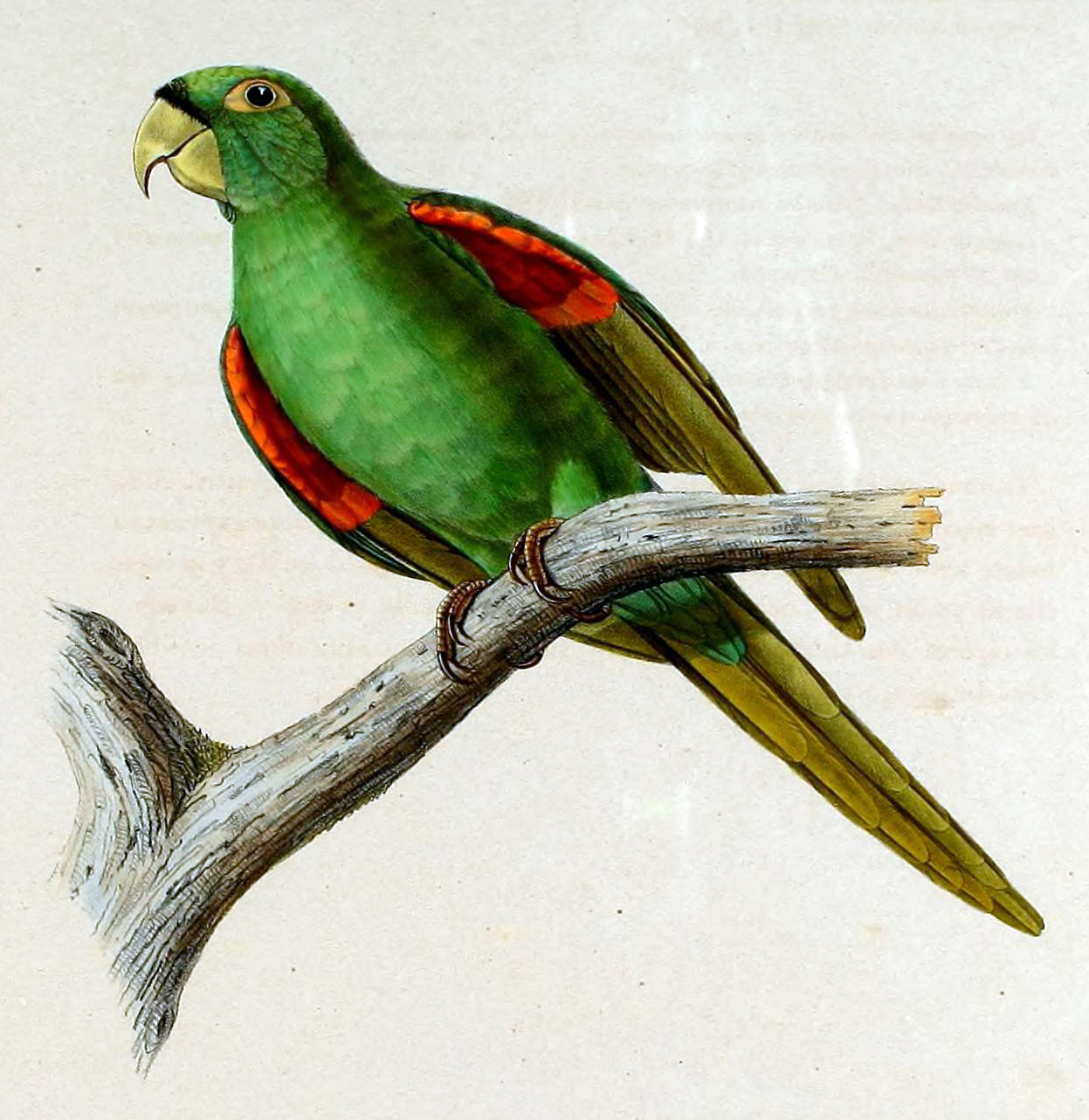
Sketch of Hispaniolan parakeet (VU)

Etang Saumâtre has over 100 waterfowl species as well as flamingo. There are over 200 species of avifauna, including the palmchat, La Selle thrush, introduced guineafowl, and grey-crowned tanager which is unique to Haiti.

BirdLife International has identified 10 Important Bird Areas in Haiti, which cover about 23,200 hectares (57,000 acres) (1% of land area of Haiti). Of these, five are located in the four protected areas system while the other five are yet to be initiated. The prominent near threatened species is the grey-crowned palm-tanager (Phaenicophilus poliocephalus). As of 2013, the bird species identified are 266 of which globally threatened are 14, 2 are endemic. and nine introduced species. The species which are critically threatened, near threatened, endangered and vulnerable category are the following. Hispaniolan trogon (Priotelus roseigaster) is endemic, near threatened according to Red List IUCN and is the national bird of Haiti.

Critically endangered

- Ridgway's hawk (Buteo ridgwayi)

Endangerered

- Bay-breasted cuckoo (Coccyzus rufigularis)
- La Selle thrush (Turdus swalesi)
- Hispaniolan crossbill (Loxia megaplaga)

Near-threatened

- Northern bobwhite (Colinus virginianus)
- Reddish egret (Egretta rufescens)
- Piping plover (Charadrius melodus)
- Semipalmated sandpiper (Calidris alba)
- Buff-breasted sandpiper (Tryngites subruficollis)
- White-crowned pigeon (Patagioenas leucocephala)
- Plain pigeon (Patagioenas inornata)
- Least pauraque (Siphonorhis brewsteri)
- Chimney swift (Chaetura pelagica)
- Hispaniolan trogon (Priotelus roseigaster)
- Palm crow (Corvus palmarum)
- Golden-winged warbler (Vermivora chrysoptera)
- Gray-crowned palm-tanager (Phaenicophilus poliocephalus)

Vulnerable

- West Indian whistling-duck (Dendrocygna arborea)
- Hispaniolan parakeet (Aratinga chloroptera)
- Hispaniolan parrot (Amazona ventralis)
- White-necked crow (Corvus leucognaphalus)
- Golden swallow (Tachycineta euchrysea)
- Bicknell's thrush (Catharus bicknelli)
- White-winged warbler (Xenoligea montana)

=== Reptiles ===
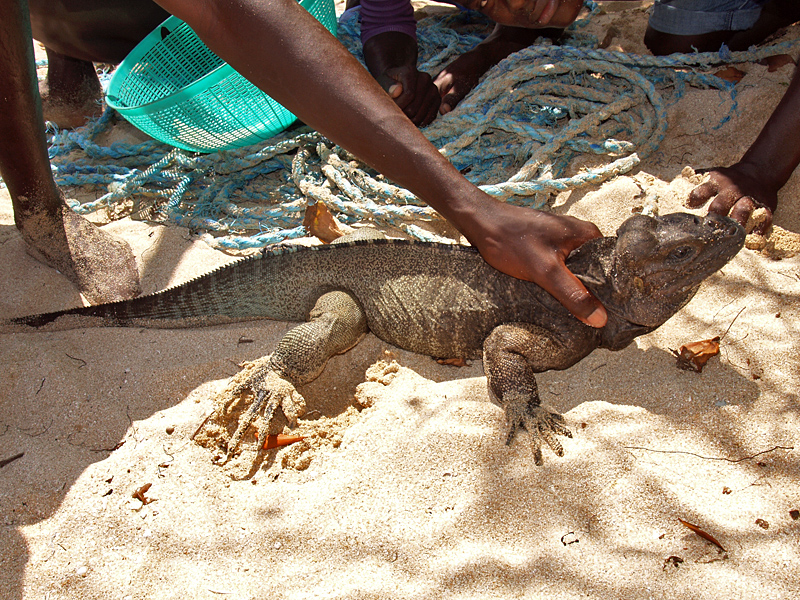
Rhinoceros iguana (Cyclura cornuta) on Limbe Island, northern Haiti

The American crocodile is reported at Etang Saumâtre. Caimans are also reported in the rivers in the southern part of the peninsula. Snake charming is an active trade in Haiti, and wild snakes are often hunted in the country.

=== Amphibians ===
Six species of amphibians (frogs) have been reported. These are: Hispaniolan ventriloquial frog, Macaya breast-spot frog, La Hotte glanded frog, Macaya burrowing frog, Mozart's frog and Hispaniolan crowned frog. However, La Selle grass frog, the reportedly extinct species, has not been traced. The endemic frogs species are found in the remote southern mountains of Haiti and are considered "a 'barometer species' for ecological health" of the island country.

=== Molluscs ===
A certain species of tree snail in Haiti can only survive on a specific type of tree in the country. Such snails, such as the candy-stripe tree snail, are "so admired for their beauty".
