= Telecommunications in Haiti =

Telecommunications in Haiti Internet, radio, television, fixed and mobile telephones.

== Internet access ==
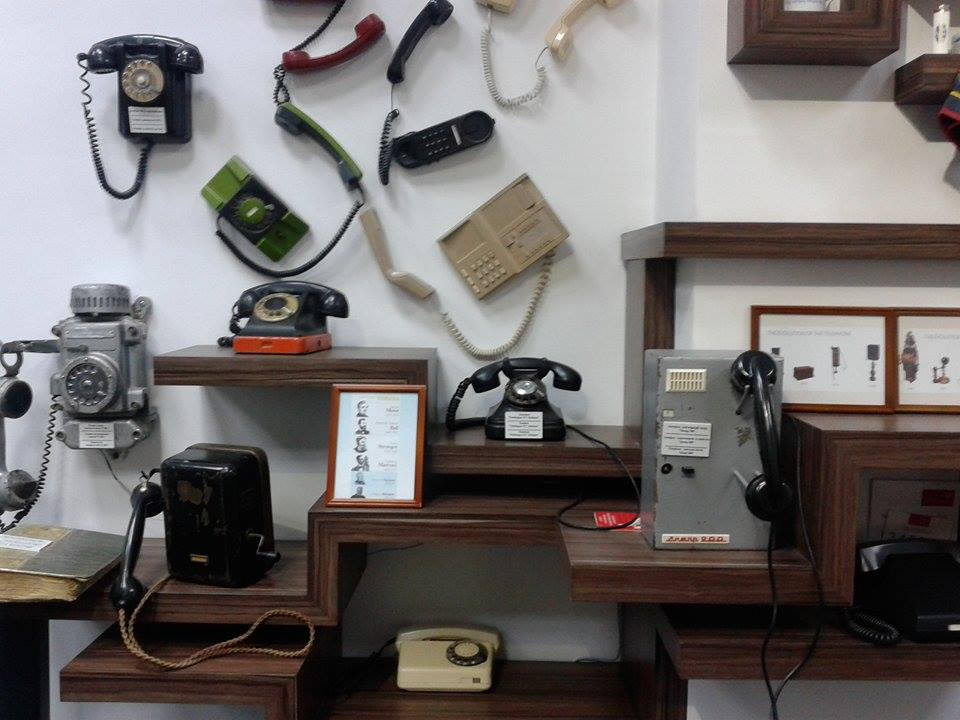

There are 4 Internet service providers serving the country – NATCOM, Access Haiti, Hainet., and Digicel Haiti. The Haitian telecommunications authority, CONATEL, decided in October 2010 to allow the introduction of 3G services by the mobile telephone service providers. This will enable them to deploy faster mobile internet access speeds throughout their networks than what is currently available with GPRS/EDGE.

NATCOM is the leading internet company in Haiti with a wide range of internet connectivity solutions. From 4G LTE, Fiber to the home and to the business, Wireless point to point and point to multi point solutions. NATCOM offers guaranteed SLA's thanks to its robust local network and exclusive 4 international links to the global undersea fiber networks.

== Pricing ==
As of September 2017, Taxes are included.

Fiber Optic Consumer Pricing

Pricing per month by download speed and provider

Download Speed (Mbps)	NATCOM	Hainet	Access Haiti
2 Mbit/s	US$50.00	US$60.00	US$54.55
4 Mbit/s	US$90.00	US$100.00	US$99.00
6 Mbit/s	US$150.00	US$150.00	US$149.00
8 Mbit/s	$200.00 USD	US$199.00	US$199.00
12 Mbit/s	US$250.00	US$250.00	US$249.00
15 Mbit/s	$300.00 USD	US$299.00	US$299.00
25 Mbit/s	US$400.00	US$350.00	US$349.00

Local Taxes are not Included in the prices Above

== Internet censorship and surveillance ==
There are no government restrictions on access to the Internet or credible reports that the government monitors e-mail or Internet chat rooms without judicial oversight.

The law provides for freedom of speech and press, and the government and elected officials generally respect these rights in practice. The independent media are active and express a wide variety of views without restriction. However, there have been incidents of local officials harassing or threatening journalists and others who criticized the government. Journalists complain about defamation lawsuits that the government threatens or files against the press for statements made about public officials or private figures in the public arena.

Defamation carries both criminal and civil penalties. Some journalists practice self-censorship on stories related to drug trafficking or allegations of business and political corruption, likely due to past patterns of retribution against activists and journalists engaged in investigative reporting. The law prohibits arbitrary interference with privacy, family, home, or correspondence, but the government does not always respect these prohibitions in practice.

== Radio and television ==
- Radio stations: Government-owned radio network; more than 250 private and community radio stations with about 50 FM stations in Port-au-Prince alone (2007).
- Television stations: Several TV stations, including one government-owned; cable TV subscription service is available (2007).
- Television sets: 38,120 (1997).
- Radio and TV stations in Haiti in 2010:

Number of radio and television stations
Department	AM	FM	VHF	UHF	Cable	Satellite
Ouest	4	66	7	30	3	*
Sud-EsT	3	18	1	3	*	*
Nippes	0	5	0	0	0	0
Sud	3	19	9	2	2	*
Grande-Anse	5	12	2	0	-	-
Centre	2	10	3	0	-	-
Artibonite	6	42	6	1	-	-
Nord-Est	1	9	9	9	-	-
Nord	7	30	8	2	-	-
Nord-Ouest	3	15	2	1	*	*
Total	34	226	36	38	-	-

Tele Haiti is a television broadcasting network providing paid television services with over 140 local and international channels on its network TeleHaiti.

== Telephones ==
- Calling code: +509
- International Call Prefix: 00

Land lines

In 2012, there were 50,000 main lines in use ranking Haiti 163rd in the world.

Natcom, the result of the privatization of Télécommunications d'Haiti S.A.M. (Teleco) in 2010, has a monopoly on the provision of landline services throughout the country. The Vietnamese company Viettel bought a 60% share, with the Haitian government keeping the remaining 40% of the company.

Teleco was constantly hobbled by political interference which affected its performance. A net generator of revenues for the government in the 1970s and early 1980s, Teleco's fortunes then began to decline.

Mobile cellular

Despite wide-ranging poverty, Haiti increased its mobile phone coverage rate from 6% to 30% in one year (May 2006 to May 2007). Haiti is now the driving force in mobile phone growth in the Caribbean, while radio remains the primary information medium for most Haitians.

- 6.1 million mobile lines (102nd in the world) covering 61.6% of the population (2012).
- There were two major cell phone providers: Comcel/Voila, Haitel until 2006 when Digicel, a Denis O'Brien company, begun servicing the Haitian network. Later, Natcom purchased 60% of Teleco (the main landline company in Haiti for about 4 decades) in 2011, then it became a direct competitor to Digicel.
  - Comcel, a subsidiary of Trilogy International Partners, LLC, was a TDMA company which launched its service in September 1999.
  - Digicel Haiti, an affiliate of the pan-Caribbean Digicel Group won Haiti's first GSM license in June 2005 and launched service in early 2006.
  - Haitel, an independent company founded by Franck Ciné, a Haitian-American and former MCI Inc executive, adopted CDMA technology.

In May 2006, Comcel and Haitel had a total of about 500,000 subscribers - a cell phone coverage rate of 6% for a population of 8.2 million. Digicel entered the market in May 2006. After one year of operations, May 2006-May 2007, Digicel went from zero to 1.4 million subscribers. The other two cell phone providers, Comcel and Haitel, responded by cutting their prices and offering new services such as Voilà, a GSM service by Comcel, and CDMA 2000 by Haitel. As a result, Comcel and Haitel increased their subscribers from 500,000 to 1 million. As of April 2012, Digicel has about 3.5 million cell phone subscribers in Haiti. In May 2007, Digicel started offering two BlackBerry services with Internet, one for enterprises and one for individuals. On March 30, 2012, Digicel completed the acquisition of Comcel / Voila, its main competitor in the Haitian market.

System

- Haiti's telecommunications infrastructure is among the least developed in Latin America and the Caribbean (2010).
- Domestic facilities are barely adequate.
  - Mobile-cellular telephone services are expanding rapidly due, in part, to the introduction of low-cost GSM phones (2010).
  - Mobile-cellular teledensity exceeds 40 per 100 persons (2010).
  - Coaxial cable and microwave radio relay trunk service.
- International facilities are slightly better.
  - Satellite earth stations: 1 Intelsat (Atlantic Ocean) (2010).

== Internet ==
- Haiti's country code top-level domain is .ht and is managed by NIC.ht Consortium FDS/RDDH. As of March 2009, it had 1155 domain names registered.
- Internet users: 1.3 million, 165th in the world; 12.2% of the population, 168th in the world (2015).
- Fixed broadband: unknown (2012).
- Mobile broadband: 15,781 subscriptions, 137th in the world; 0.2% of the population, 144th in the world (2012).
- Internet hosts: 555 hosts, 181st in the world (2012).
- IPv4: 124,160 addresses allocated, less than 0.05% of the world's total, 13 per 1000 people.

== See also ==
- Radio Télévision Nationale d'Haïti (TNH), state radio and television broadcaster of Haiti, part of the Ministry of Culture.
- Media of Haiti

== Bibliography ==
- ""New" Media Crucial in Aftermath of Haitian Earthquake", Columbia Journalism Review, US, 2010, archived from the original on 2018-01-13
