= List of valleys of Haiti =

== Physical geography ==
Haiti's topography.

Haiti terrain varies, with more than 3/4ths of the territory above 700 feet (210 m). Its climate is tropical and semiarid. Fertile valleys are interspersed between the mountain ranges forming vast areas of contrast between elevations in many areas throughout the territory. Haiti (and Hispaniola) are separated from Cuba by way of the Windward Passage, a 45 nmi (83 km; 52 mi) wide strait that passes between the two countries.

Haiti's lowest elevation is reported by one source to be sea level (the Caribbean Sea), by another source to be below sea level (Gheskio clinic, Port-au-Prince or in Gonaïves,), while its highest point is Pic la Selle at 2,680 m (8,793 ft).

- Haiti's most important valley in terms of crops is the Plaine de l'Artibonite, which is oriented south of the Montagnes Noires. This region supports the country's (also Ile d'Haiti's) longest river, the Riviere l'Artibonite whose watershed begins in the western region of the Dominican Republic and continues most of its length through central Haiti and onward where it empties into the Gulf of Gonâve. The river is navigable for a distance by barge. The eastern and central region of the island is a large elevated plateau.
- The northern region consists of the Massif du Nord (Northern Massif) and the Plaine du Nord (Northern Plain). The Massif du Nord is an extension of the Cordillera Central in the Dominican Republic. It begins at Haiti's eastern border, north of the Guayamouc River, and extends to the northwest through the northern peninsula. The Plateau Central (Central Plateau) extends along both sides of the Guayamouc River, south of the Massif du Nord. It runs from the southeast to the northwest. To the southwest of the Plateau Central are the Montagnes Noires, whose most northwestern part merges with the Massif du Nord.
- The southern region consists of the Plaine du Cul-de-Sac (the southeast) and the mountainous southern peninsula (also known as the Tiburon Peninsula). The Plaine du Cul-de-Sac is a natural depression which harbors the country's saline lakes, such as Trou Caïman and Haiti's largest lake Lac Azuei (also known as Etang Saumatre). The Chaîne de la Selle mountain range, an extension of the southern mountain chain of the Dominican Republic (the Sierra de Baoruco), extends from the Massif de la Selle in the east to the Massif de la Hotte in the west. This mountain range harbors Pic la Selle, the highest point in Haiti at 2,680 metres (8,793 ft).

== Plateau Central ==
- Area Hectares:217,600
- Square Kilometers:2,170
- Squares Miles:840.15

== Plaine de L'artibonite ==
- Area Hectares:80,000
- Square Kilometers:800
- Squares Miles:308.84

== Plains and Valleys of Surrounding islands ==
- Area Hectares:71,300
- Square Kilometers:713
- Squares Miles:275.29

== Plaines de Nord & de Fort-Liberté ==
- Area Hectares:38,100
- Square Kilometers:381
- Squares Miles:147.10

== Plaine du Cul-de-Sac ==
- Area Hectares:37,300
- Square Kilometers:713
- Squares Miles:275.29

== Plaine du Nord-Ouest ==
- Area Hectares:
- Square Kilometers:
- Squares Miles:

== Plaines de Cayes & de Torbek ==
- Area Hectares:
- Square Kilometers:
- Squares Miles:

== Plaines de la Grand' Anse & des Abricots ==
- Area Hectares:
- Square Kilometers:
- Squares Miles:

== Plaines des Gonaïnes & de Savane Désolée ==
- Area Hectares:
- Square Kilometers:
- Squares Miles:

== Plaine de Léognane ==
- Area Hectares:
- Square Kilometers:
- Squares Miles:

== Plaine de L'Arcahaie ==
- Area Hectares:
- Square Kilometers:
- Squares Miles:

== Plaines de Nippes ==
- Area Hectares:
- Square Kilometers:
- Squares Miles:

== Plaines de Limbé & de Port-Margot ==
- Area Hectares:
- Square Kilometers:
- Squares Miles:

== Plaines des Moustiques, Port-de-Paix & Anse-à-Foleur ==
- Area Hectares:
- Square Kilometers:
- Squares Miles:

== Plaines de Côteaux, Les Anglais, Irois ==
- Area Hectares:
- Square Kilometers:
- Squares Miles:

== Plaines de Rochelois, Fonds-des-Nègres, L'Asile ==
- Area Hectares:
- Square Kilometers:
- Squares Miles:

== Vallée de Saut-d'Eaude Mirebalais ==
- Area Hectares:
- Square Kilometers:
- Squares Miles:

== Plaines de Saint-Marc & Montrouis ==
- Area Hectares:
- Square Kilometers:
- Squares Miles:

== Plaines d'Aquin & Côtes-de-Fer ==
- Area Hectares:
- Square Kilometers:
- Squares Miles:

== Plaines de Petit-Goâve ==
- Area Hectares:
- Square Kilometers:
- Squares Miles:

== See also ==
- List of environmental issues
- List of natural disasters in Haiti
