= Tiburon Peninsula =

Region and peninsula in Haïti

Coordinates: 18°21′N 73°08′W

Location of the Tiburon Peninsula, shaded in green

The Tiburon Peninsula (French: Péninsule de Tiburon [penɛ̃syl də tibyʁɔ̃]; Haitian Creole: Penensil Tibiwon), or simply the Tiburon (French: Tiburon; Haitian Creole: Tibiwon), is a region encompassing most of Haiti's southern coast. It starts roughly at the southernmost point of the Dominican Republic–Haiti border and extends westward near Cuba, forming a large headland. Three of Haiti's ten departments are located entirely within the region. They are the departments of Grand'Anse, Nippes and Sud. A large part of Ouest department is also located in the region, with the capital, Port-au-Prince serving as the line of demarcation between central Haiti and the south. Half of Sud-Est is also located within the Tiburon Peninsula. The mountains on the peninsula are known as the Massif de la Hotte.
