= Military ranks of Haiti =

The Military ranks of Haiti are the military insignia used by the Armed Forces of Haiti. Being a former colony of France, Haiti shares a rank structure similar to that of France but uses US-pattern rank insignia.

== Current ranks ==
=== Commissioned officer ranks ===
The rank insignia of commissioned officers.

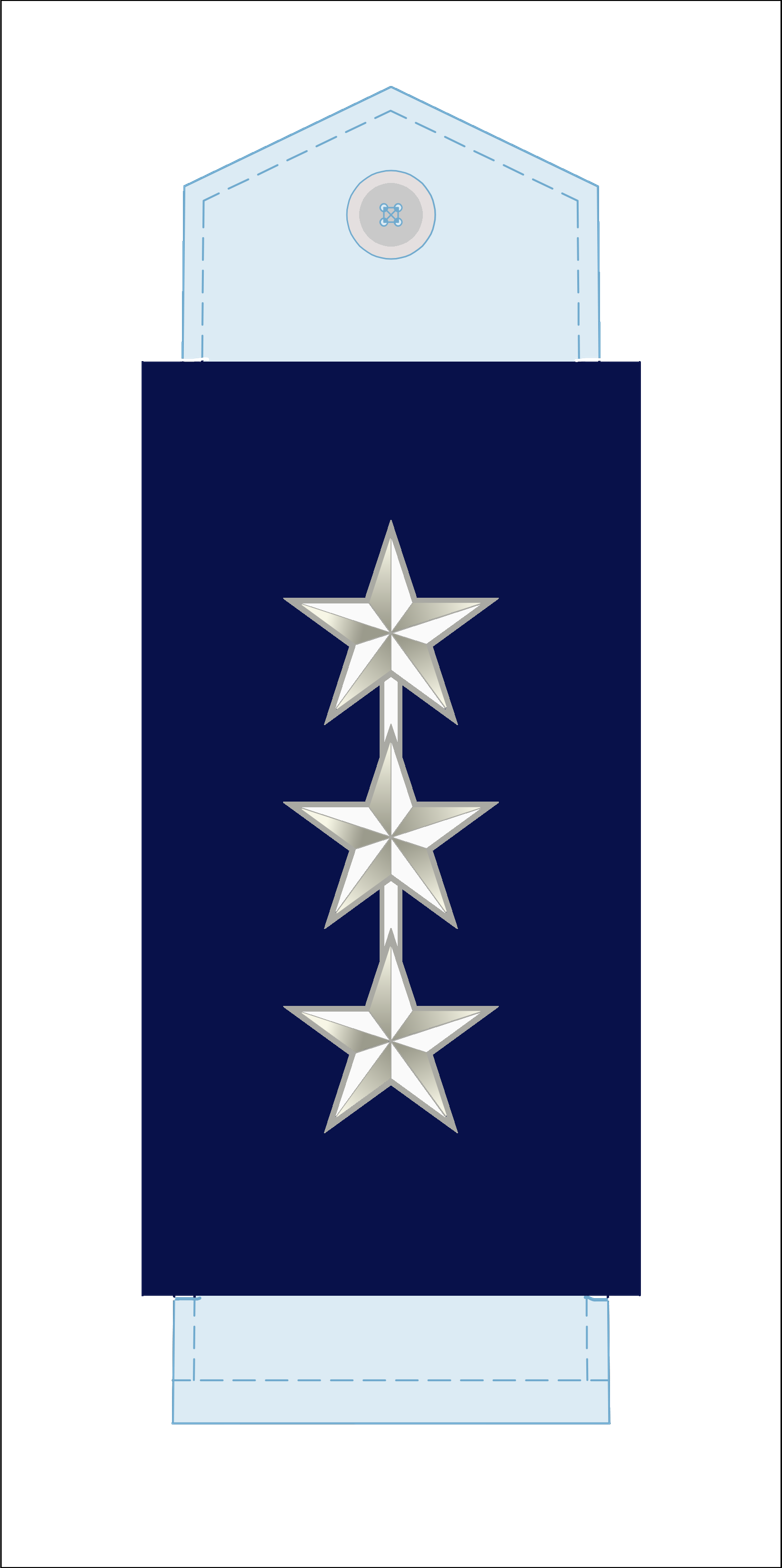
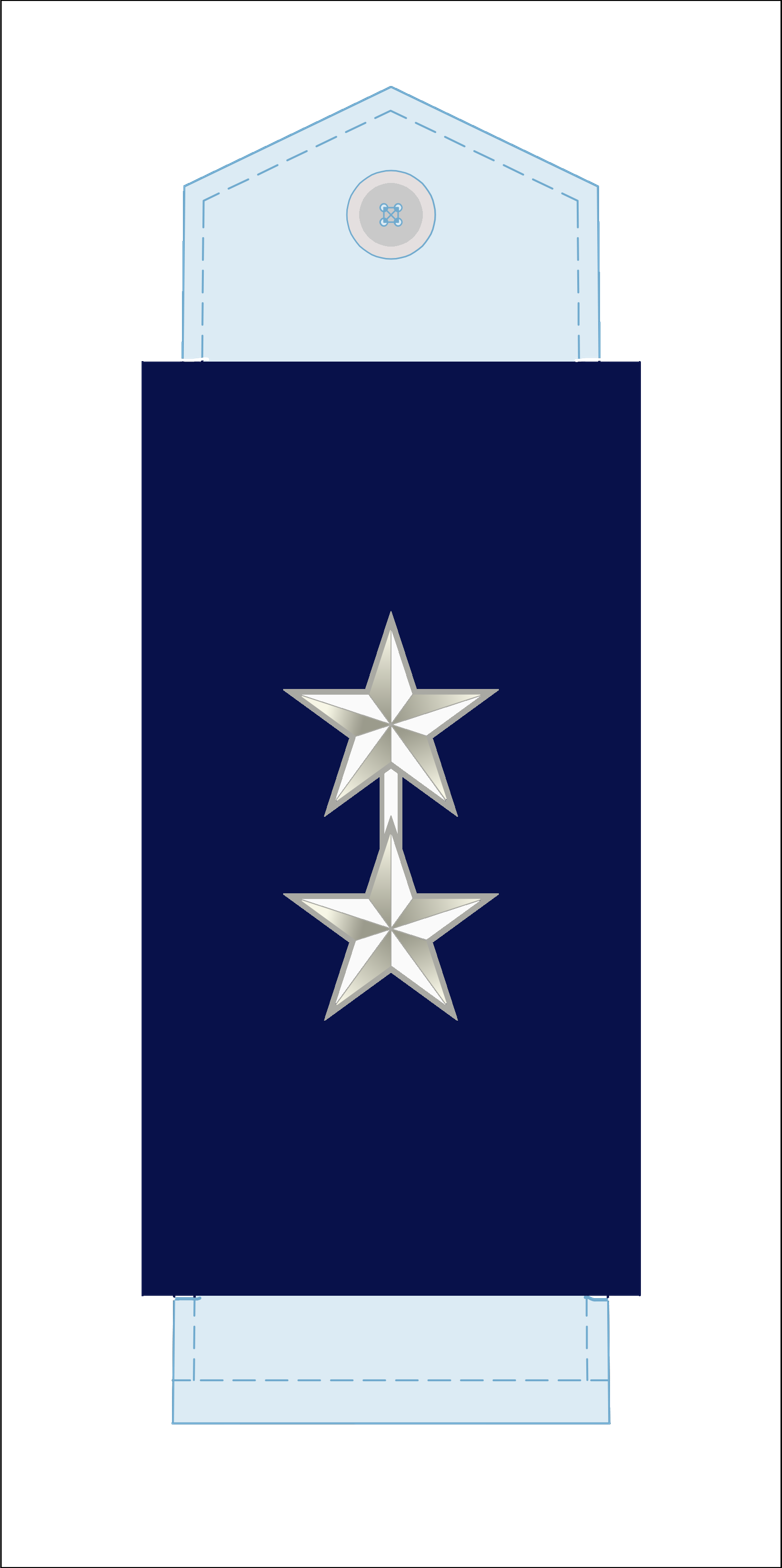
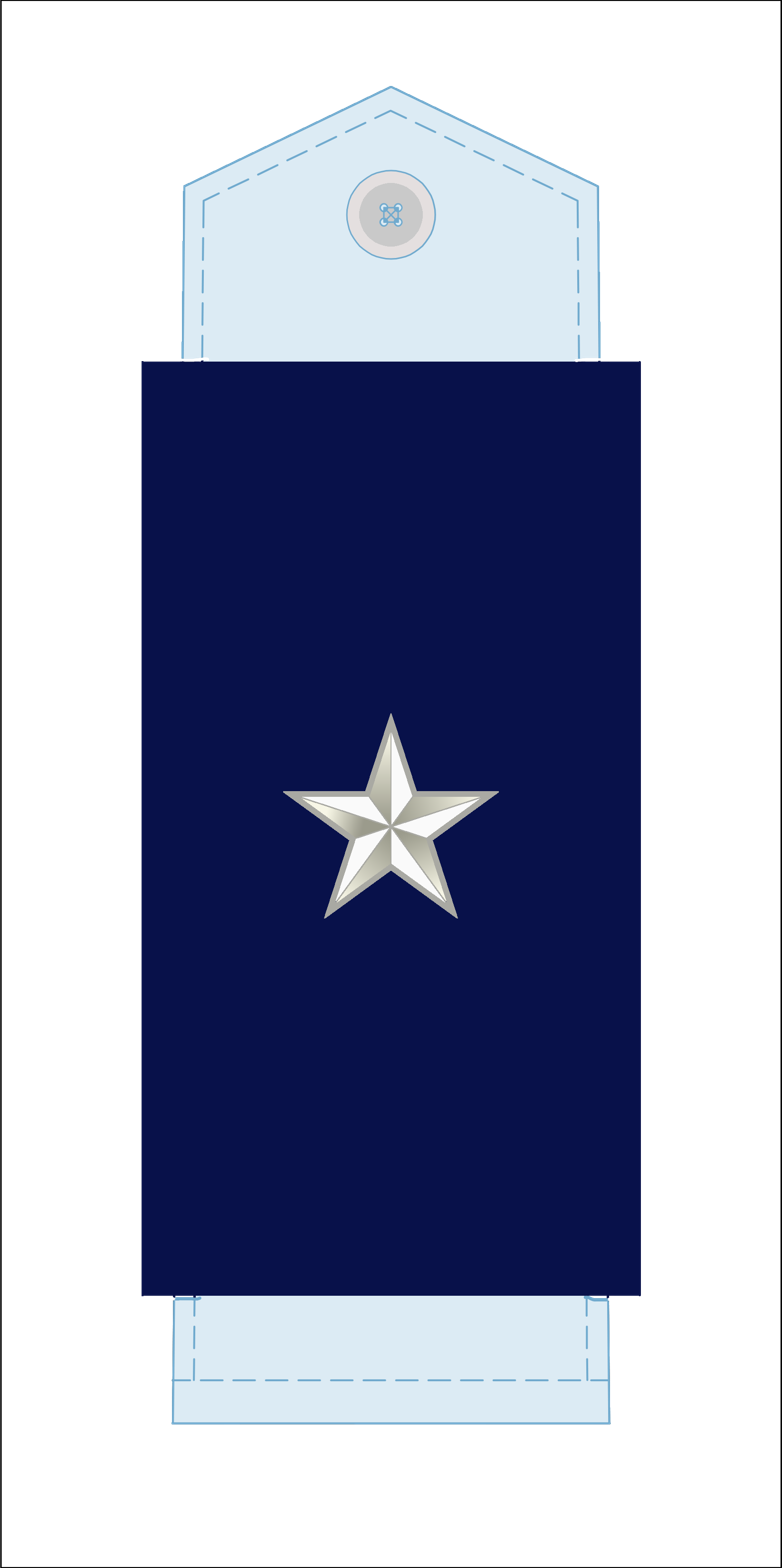
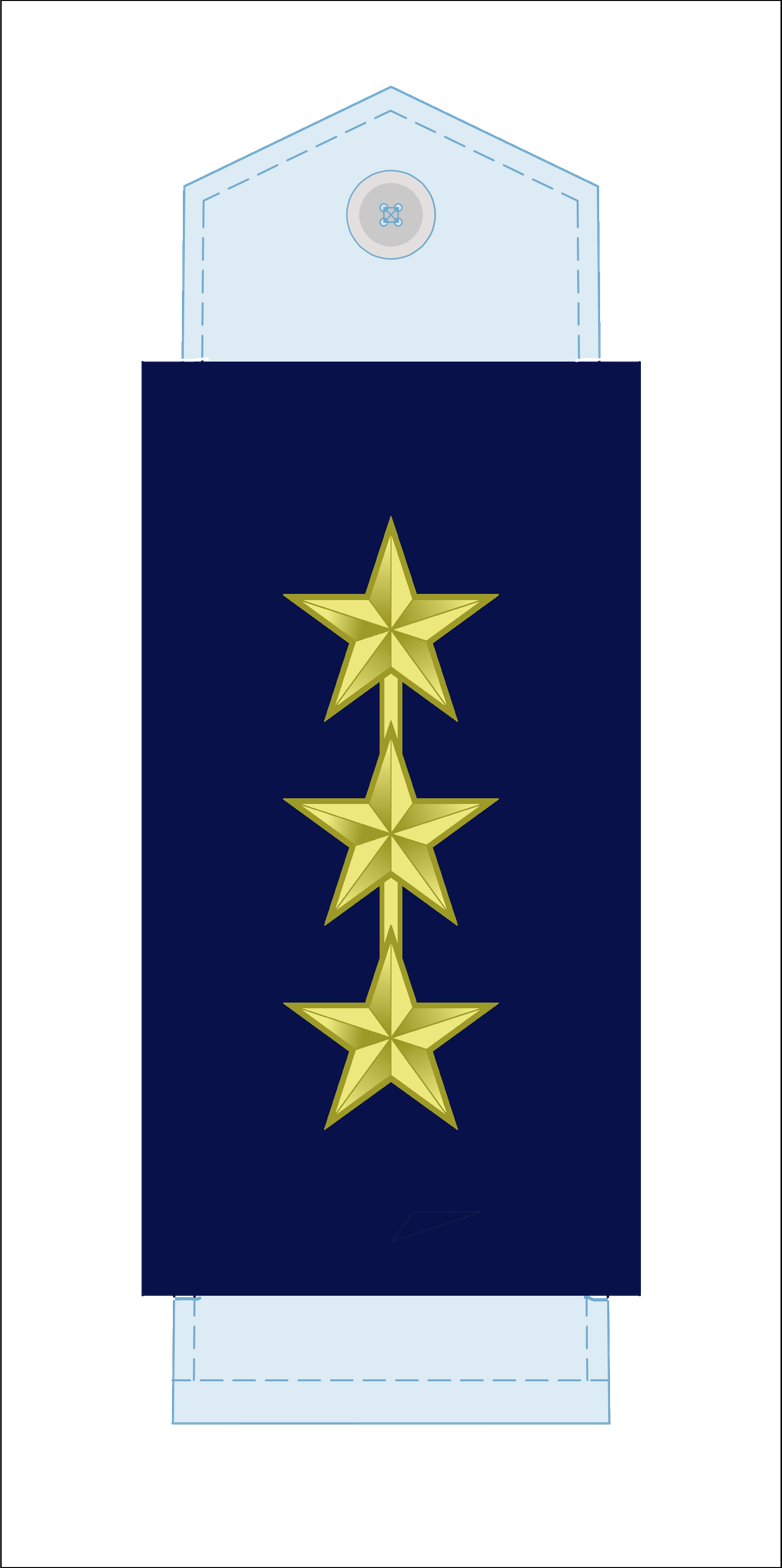
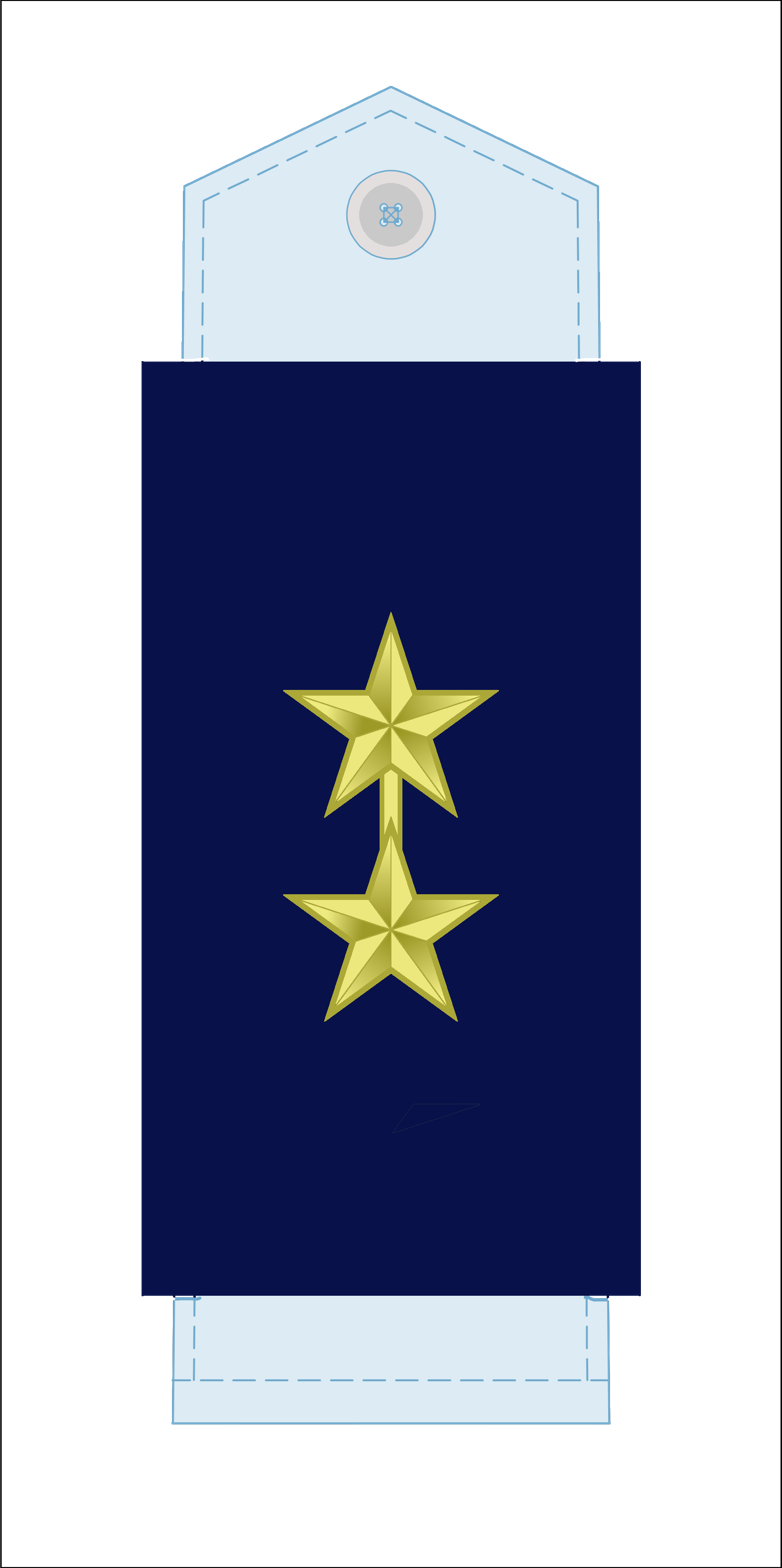
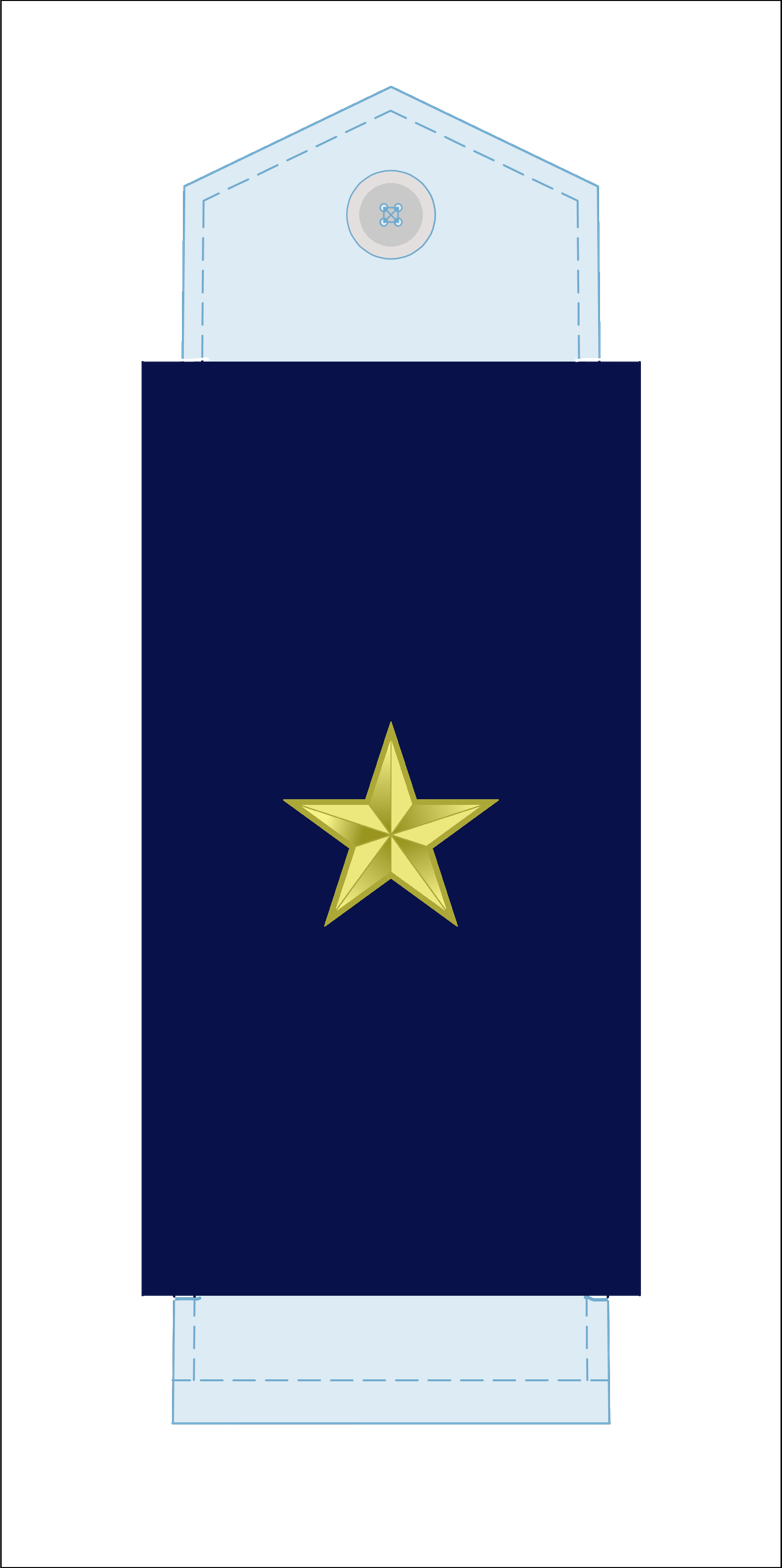
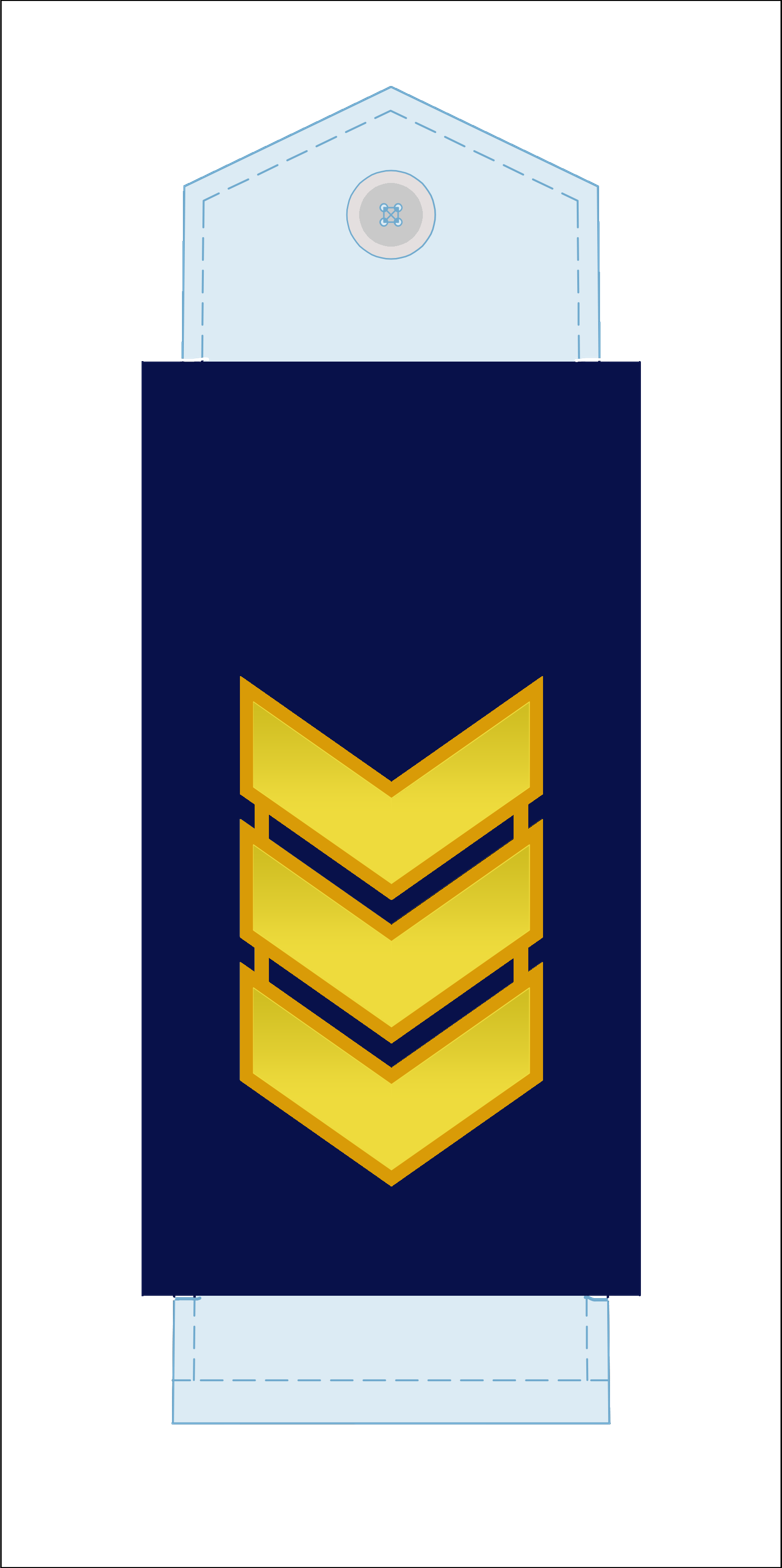
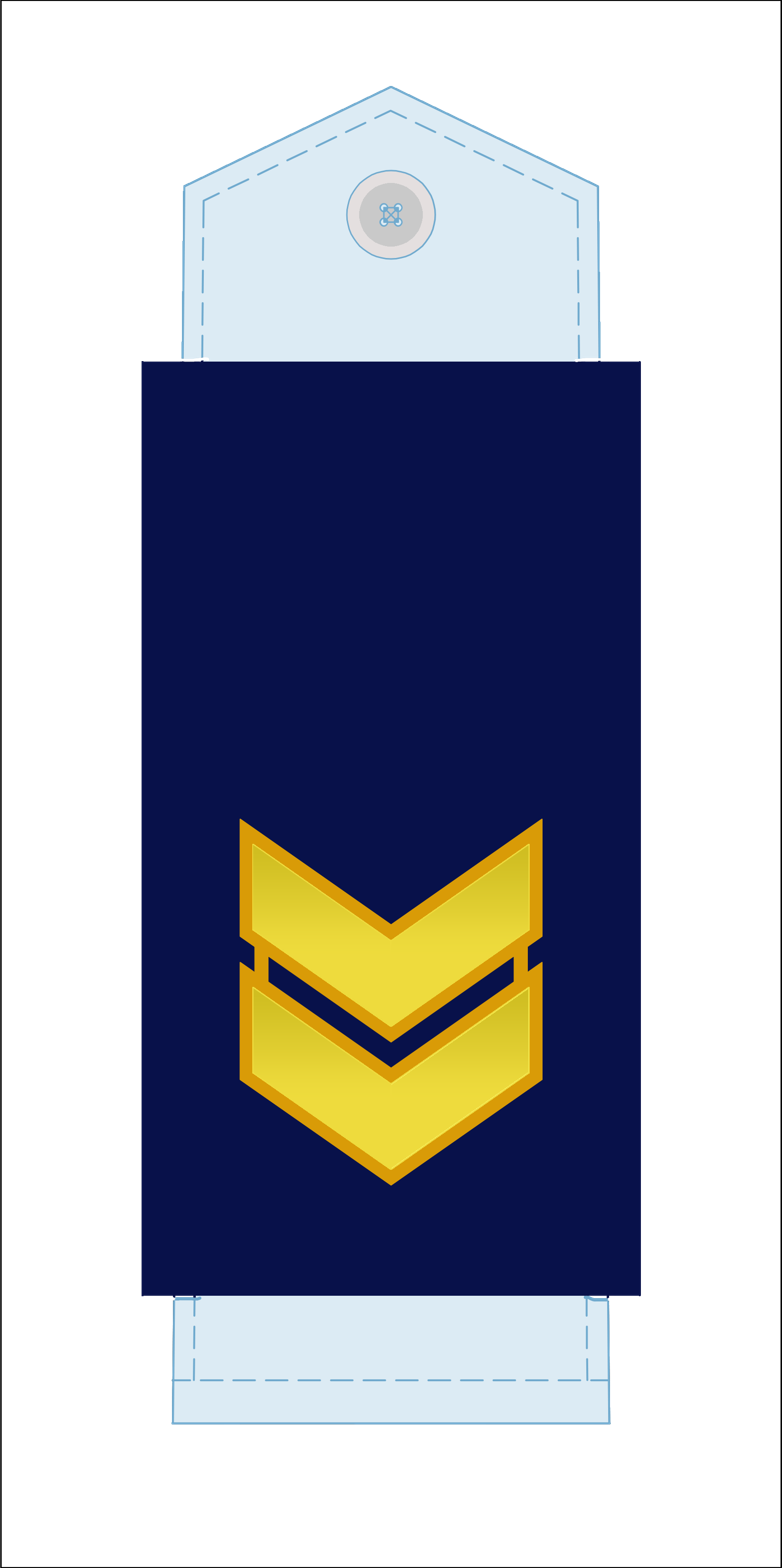
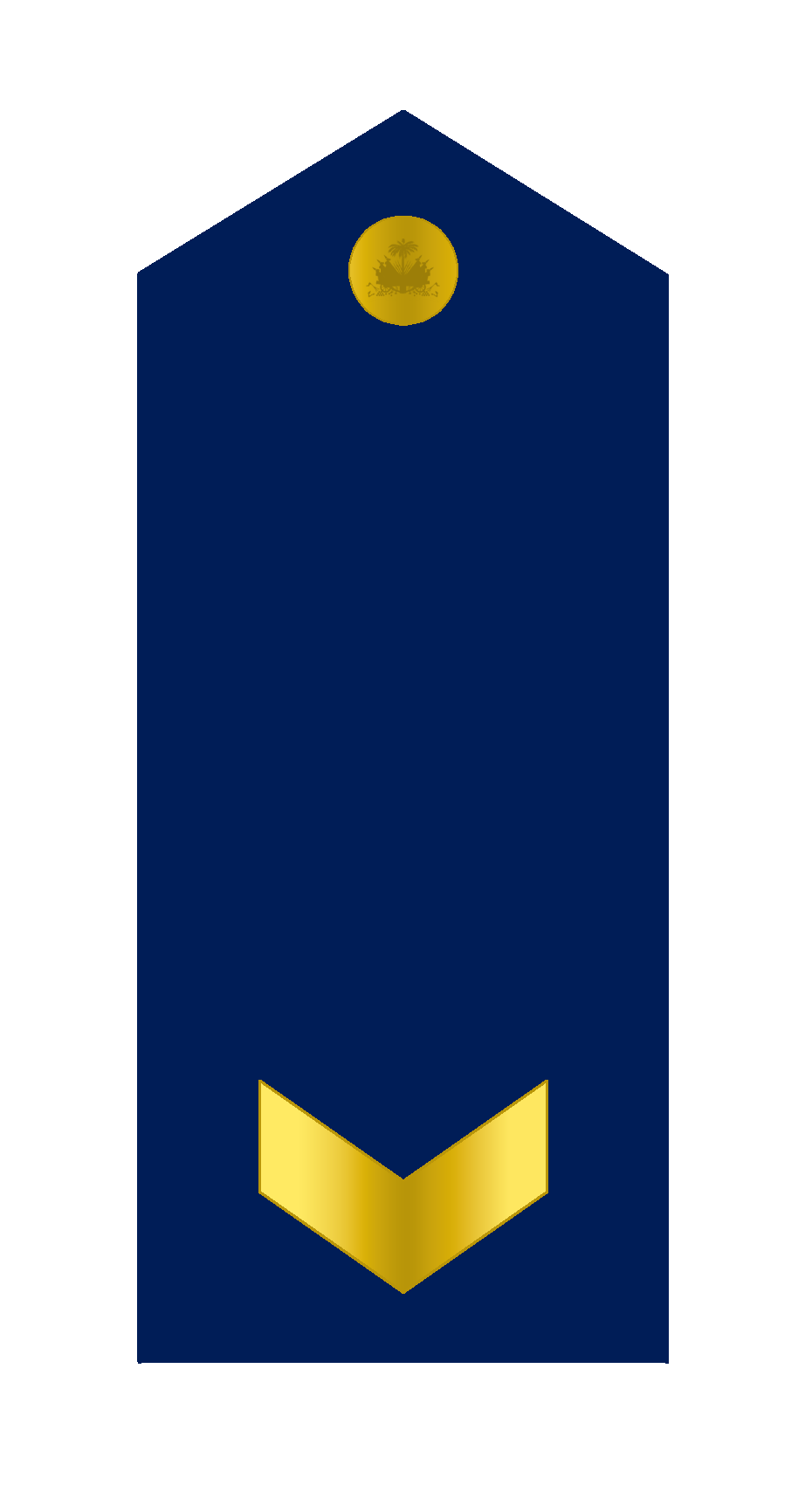
Rank group	General / flag officers			Senior officers			Junior officers
Haitian Army
Haitian Army	Lieutenant général	Major général	Général de brigade	Colonel	Lieutenant-colonel	Major	Capitaine	Lieutenant	Sous-lieutenant	Adjutant
Haitian Army	Lyetnan jeneral	Majò jeneral	Jeneral brigad	Kolonèl	Lyetnan kolonèl	Majò	Kapitèn	Lyetnan	Soulyetnan	Adjitan
Haitian Aviation Corps
Haitian Aviation Corps	Lieutenant général	Major général	Général de brigade	Colonel	Lieutenant-colonel	Major	Capitaine	Lieutenant		Sous-lieutenant
Haitian Aviation Corps	Lyetnan jeneral	Majò jeneral	Jeneral brigad	Kolonèl	Lyetnan kolonèl	Majò	Kapitèn	Lyetnan		Soulyetnan
Haitian Navy
Rank group	General/flag officers			Senior officers			Junior officers

=== Other ranks ===
The rank insignia of non-commissioned officers and enlisted personnel.

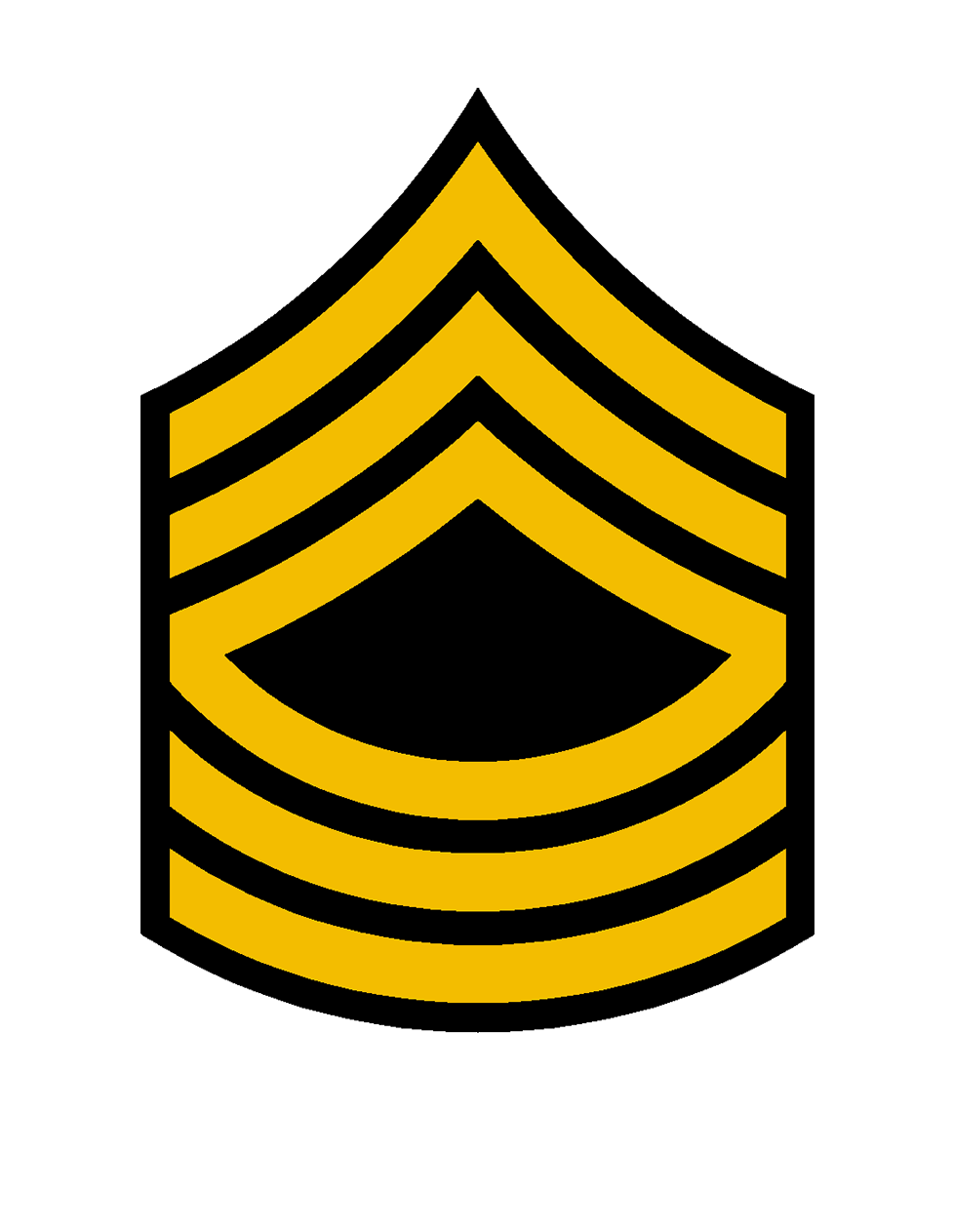
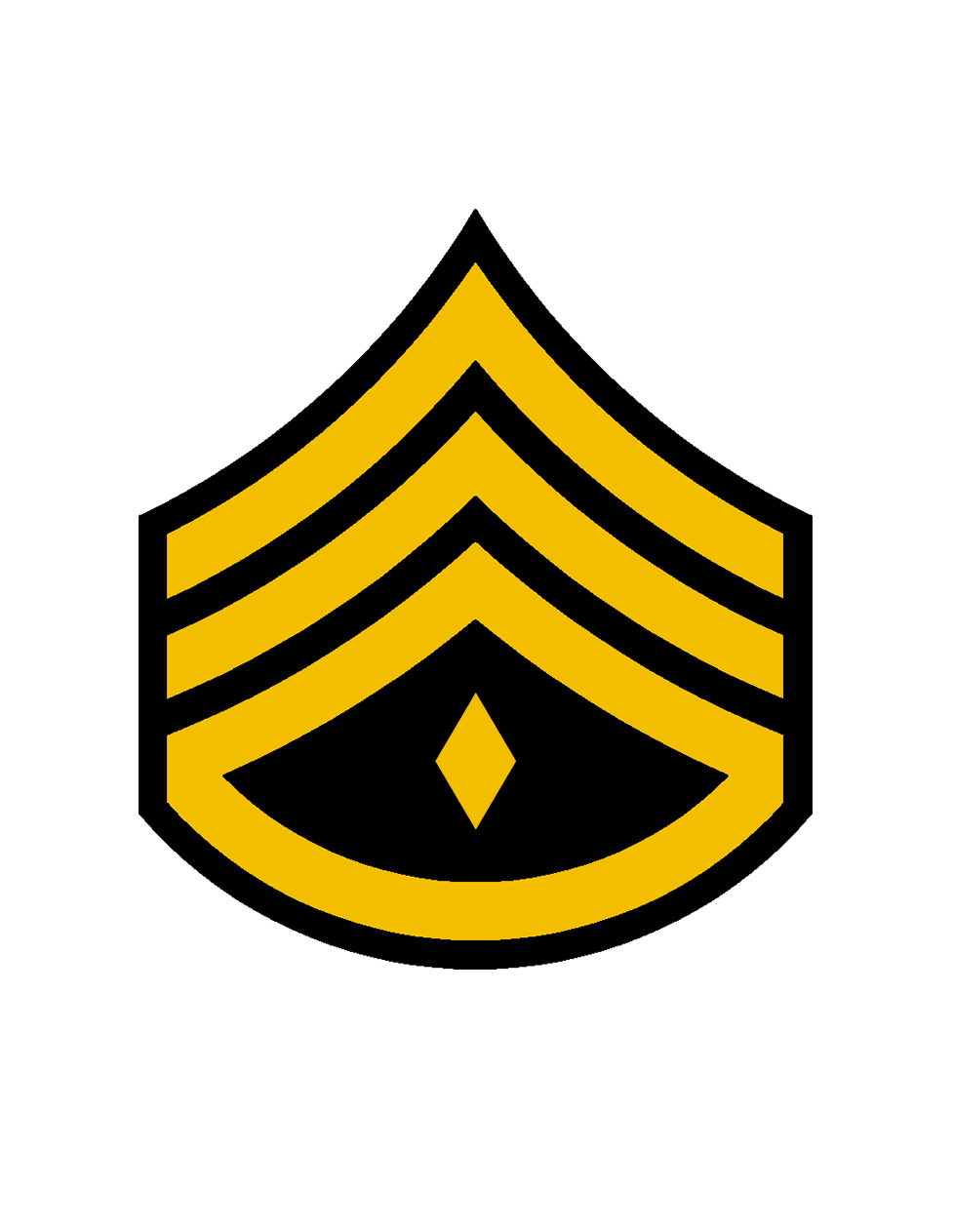
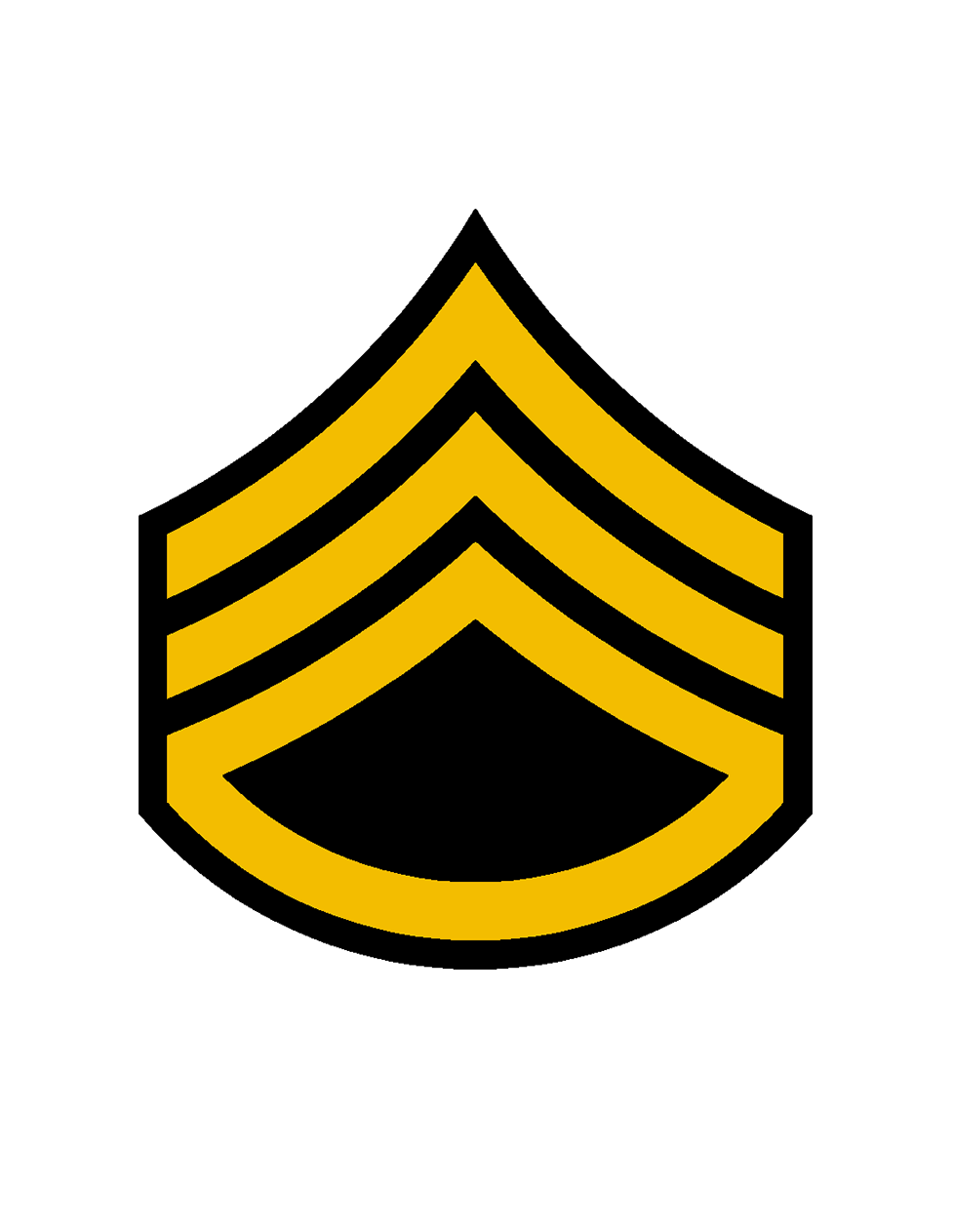
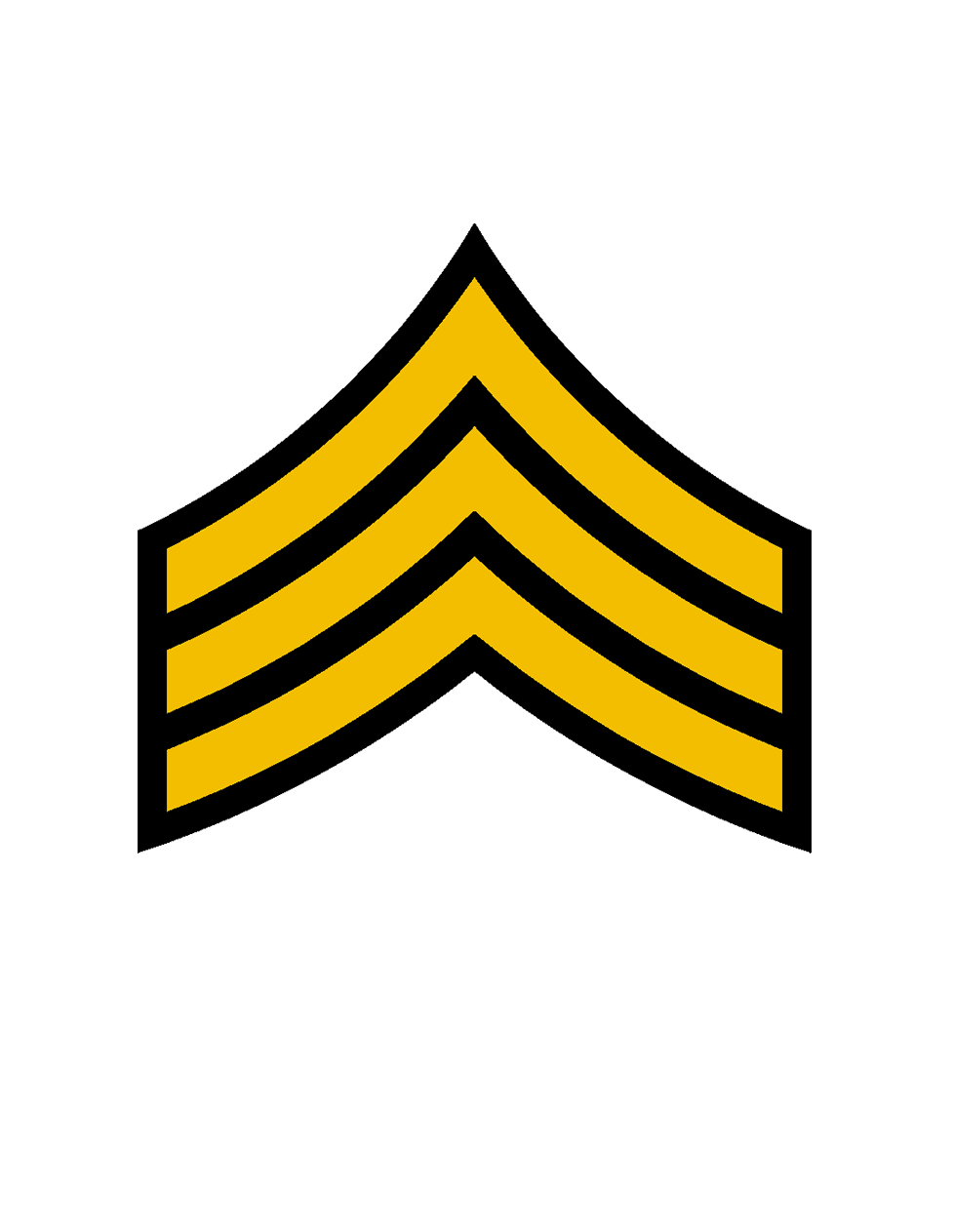
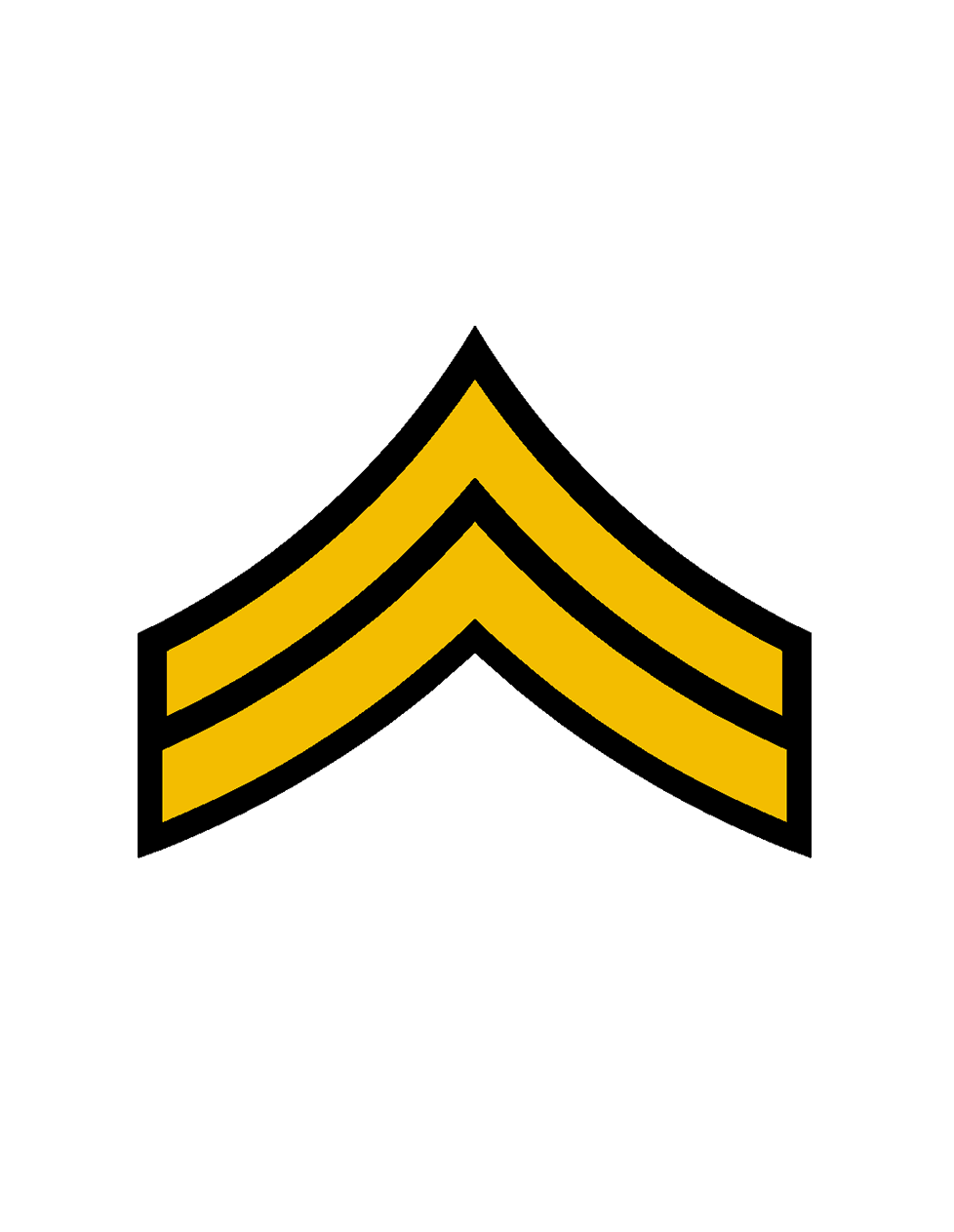
Rank group	Senior NCOs				Junior NCOs	Enlisted
Haitian Army							No insignia
Haitian Army	Sergent major	Premier sergent	Sergent-fourrier	Sergent	Caporal	Soldat de première classe	Soldat
Haitian Army	Sèjan majò	Premye sèjan	Sèjan-fourye	Sèjan	Kaporal	Sòlda premye klas	Sòlda
Haitian Aviation Corps
Haitian Navy
Rank group	Senior NCOs				Junior NCOs	Enlisted

== Historic ranks ==
The historic ranks used by the Armed Forces of Haiti, used until 1995.

=== Commissioned officer ranks ===
The rank insignia of commissioned officers.

Rank group	General/flag officers		Senior officers			Junior officers
Haitian Army (c. 1940)
Haitian Army (c. 1940)		Colonel commandant	Colonel	Lieutenant colonel	Major	Capitáne	Lieutenant	Sous-lieutenant
Haitian Army (pre-1994)
Haitian Army (pre-1994)	Major général	General de brigade	Colonel	Lieutenant colonel	Major	Capitáne	Lieutenant	Sous-lieutenant
Haitian Navy (pre-1994)
Haitian Navy (pre-1994)			Capitaine de vaisseau	Commandant	Lieutenant-commandant	Lieutenant de vaisseau	Sous-lieutenant de vaisseau	Enseigne de vaisseau
Rank group	General/flag officers		Senior officers			Junior officers

=== Other ranks ===
The rank insignia of non-commissioned officers and enlisted personnel.

Rank group	Senior NCOs					Junior NCOs	Enlisted
Haitian Army (pre-1994)								No insignia
Haitian Army (pre-1994)	Adjudant	Sergent-major	Sergent-premièr	Sergent-fourrier	Sergent	Caporal	Soldat de première classe	Soldat
Rank group	Senior NCOs					Junior NCOs	Enlisted
