= Radio Télévision Nationale d'Haïti =

Public broadcaster of Haiti

Télévision Nationale d'Haïti
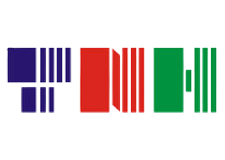
- Country: Haiti
- Headquarters: Port-au-Prince, Haiti

Programming
- Languages: French, Haitian Creole
- Picture format: 720p HDTV (downscaled to 480i for SDTV feed)

Ownership
- Owner: Government of Haiti

History
- Launched: December 23, 1979; 46 years ago

Links
- Website: www.rtnh.ht

Availability

Terrestrial
- VHF 8

Télévision Nationale d'Haïti (French pronunciation: [ʁadjo televizjɔ̃ nɑsjɔnal daiti]; TNH) is the state television broadcaster of Haiti. Founded December 23, 1979, under the Ministry of Information and Coordination, it was Haiti's second television station after Télé Haïti (Channels 2 and 4 with the latter in English).

In 1987, it was merged with the state-run Radio Nationale into a network called RTNH (Radio Télévision Nationale d'Haïti) and in 1995, was taken over by the Ministry of Culture.

== See also ==
- Television in Haiti
- Media of Haiti
