= .ht =

Country code top-level domain for Haiti

- Introduced: 6 March 1997
- TLD type: Country code top-level domain
- Status: Active
- Registry: Réseau de Développement Durable d'Haïti
- Sponsor: Consortium FDS/RDDH
- Intended use: Entities connected with Haiti
- Actual use: Gets some use in Haiti
- Registered domains: 3,371 (2022-10-31)
- Registration restrictions: None
- Structure: Registrations are available directly at second level
- Documents: Documents (in French); Naming Charter
- Registry website: nic.ht

.ht is the Internet country code top-level domain (ccTLD) for Haiti. It was introduced in 1997 and is managed Réseau de Développement Durable d'Haïti (RDDH) with assistance from the State University of Haiti.

Although it was originally intended for Haitian people and businesses, per NIC Haïti, anyone in the world can register a .ht domain name.

== See also ==
- Internet in Haiti
