= Television in Haiti =

Television in Haiti includes several stations including Christian live streaming channels.

== TV Stations ==
Provider	Years	Free or pay	No. broadcast channels	Households	Transmission	On demand	HD	Notes
NAGO TV								
Tidy TV Network								
4VTNH-TV								
Télévision Nationale d'Haïti	1979-Present							
TQ								

== See also ==
- Media of Haiti
