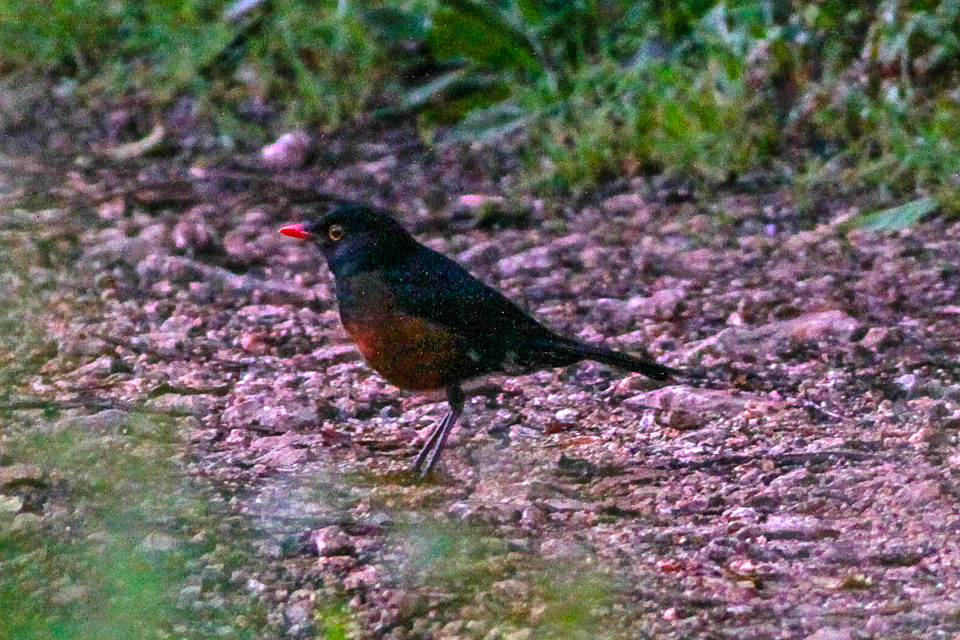

Conservation status
- Vulnerable (IUCN 3.1)

Scientific classification
- Kingdom: Animalia
- Phylum: Chordata
- Class: Aves
- Order: Passeriformes
- Family: Turdidae
- Genus: Turdus
- Species: T. swalesi

Binomial name
- Turdus swalesi (Wetmore, 1927)

= La Selle thrush =

Species of bird endemic to Hispaniola

The La Selle thrush (Turdus swalesi) is a Vulnerable species of bird in the family Turdidae, the thrushes and allies. It is endemic to the Caribbean island of Hispaniola that is shared by the Dominican Republic and Haiti.

== Taxonomy and systematics ==
The La Selle thrush was originally described by Alexander Wetmore in 1927 as Haplocichla swalesi. Wetmore chose the specific epithet swalesi to commemorate Bradshaw Hall Swales, an honorary curator at the National Museum of Natural History. The species' English name derives from the Chaîne de la Selle where the type specimen was collected.

The La Selle thrush has two subspecies, the nominate T. s. swalesi (Wetmore, 1927) and T. s. dodae (Graves, GR & Olson, 1986).

== Description ==
The La Selle thrush is 26 to 27 cm (10 to 11 in) long and weighs 88 to 110 g (3.1 to 3.9 oz). The sexes have the same plumage. Adults of the nominate subspecies have a mostly slate-black head with a bright yellow to orange eye-ring and a few white streaks on the ear coverts and throat. Their upperparts, wings, tail, and upper breast are slate-black. Their upper flanks are rusty red, their lower breast and sides rich rufous, and their belly and undertail coverts white. Adults of subspecies T. s. dodae have an olivaceous-brown back but are otherwise like the nominate. Both subspecies have a dark iris, a yellow to orange bill with a dark base, and dark gray to black legs and feet.

== Distribution and habitat ==
The La Selle thrush has a disjunct distribution. The nominate subspecies is found in southeastern Haiti's Chaîne de la Selle and east into the Baoruco Mountain Range in southwestern Dominican Republic. Subspecies T. s. dodae is found only in the Dominican Republic. There it is in the Sierra de Neiba and Cordillera Central. The species inhabits the understory of wet montane broadleaf evergreen forest and, at higher elevations, pine forest. In elevation it mostly ranges between 1,300 and 2,100 m (4,300 and 6,900 ft).

== Behavior ==
=== Movement ===
The La Selle thrush is a year-round resident and is believed to be sedentary.

=== Feeding ===
The La Selle thrush feeds on fruit, insects, and other invertebrates like earthworms. It forages mostly on the ground and sometimes does so in cultivated gardens near the edge of forest.

=== Breeding ===
The La Selle thrush's breeding season has not been defined but spans at least from May to July. It builds a bulky cup nest from twigs, grass, and mud covered with moss and placed in an understory shrub. The clutch is two or three eggs that are greenish blue with gray-brown and lavender-gray spots. The incubation period and time to fledging are not known. Both parents are assumed to care for nestlings.

=== Vocalization ===
The La Selle thrush's song is a series of "deliberate tu-re-oo and cho-ho-cho calls continued indefinitely", and it also makes "loud wheury-wheury-wheury and gurling notes".

== Status ==
The IUCN originally in 1994 assessed the La Selle thrush as Vulnerable, then in 2000 as Endangered, and since 2018 again as Vulnerable. It has a limited range and its estimated population of between 490 and 7630 mature individuals is believed to be decreasing. "There has been massive habitat loss in Hispaniola, and remaining patches are severely threatened by ongoing deforestation for agriculture and timber." Overall it is considered locally common in Haiti and rare and local in the Dominican Republic. It is found fairly regularly in the Baoruco Range though the area is threatened by illegal logging. It is found only in remote parts of the Cordillera Central and very small patches in the Sierra de Neiba. In Haiti its principal remaining habitat is in La Visite National Park.
