= Administrative divisions of Haiti =

Departments of Haiti

The administrative divisions of Haiti (Haitian Creole: divizyon administratif Ayiti) are concerned with the institutional and territorial organization of Haitian territory. There are many administrative divisions which may have political (local government), electoral (districts), or administrative (decentralized services of the state) objectives.

== Administrative divisions ==
As of 22 July 2015, Haiti comprises the following:

- 4 regions: North, Centre, West, and South.
- 10 departments, with the possibility to go up to 16. As numbered on the map, the departmental names (in French) are:
  - 1: Nord-Ouest
  - 2: Nord
  - 3: Nord-Est
  - 4: L'Artibonite
  - 5: Centre
  - 6: Ouest
  - 7: Grand' Anse
  - 8: Nippes
  - 9: Sud
  - 10: Sud-Est
- The departments are subdivided into a total of 42 arrondissements.
- The arrondissements are subdivided into 144 communes.
- The communes are subdivided into 65 quarters.
- The quarters are subdivided into 571 communal sections.

Geographically, the departments are the largest territorial divisions, regrouping into arrondissements (districts) and communes (municipalities). Each arrondissement encompasses a number of communes. While the Commune is composed of the city, neighborhoods and communal sections are basic territorial subdivisions. Quarters are neighborhoods whose status remain vague, and an ill-defined territory.
