= Enriquillo wetlands =

Ecoregion on Hispaniola

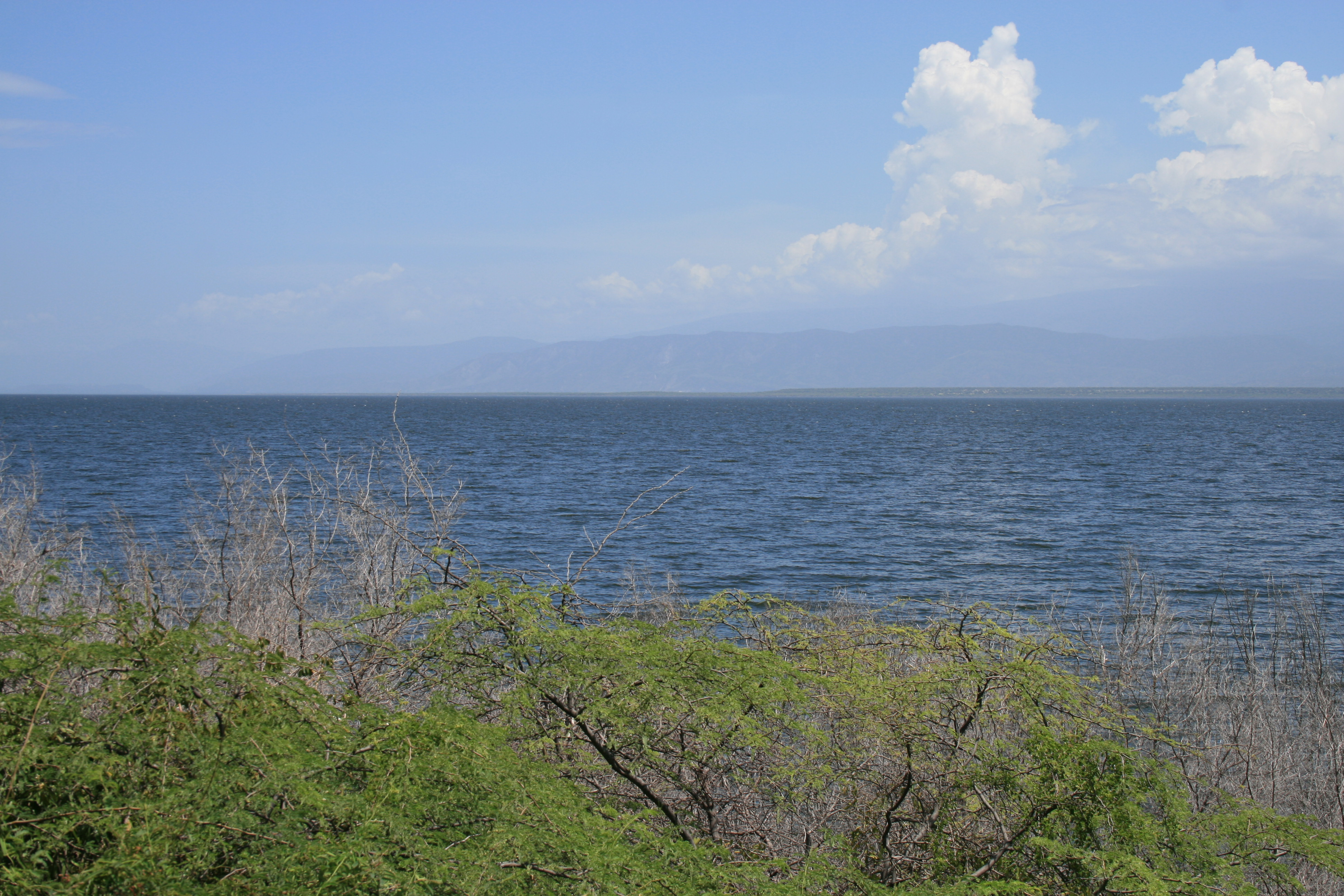
- Lake Enriquillo

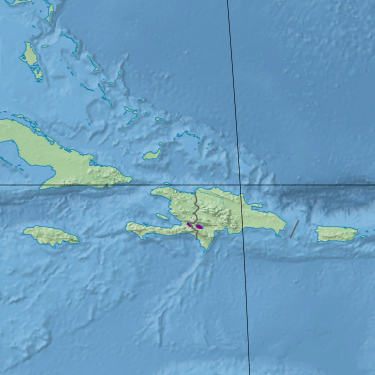
- Ecoregion territory (in purple, lower center of island)

Ecology
- Realm: Neotropical
- Biome: flooded grasslands and savannas
- Borders: Hispaniolan dry forests

Geography
- Area: 628 km^{2} (242 sq mi)
- Countries: Dominican Republic; Haiti

Conservation
- Conservation status: Vulnerable
- Protected: 397 km^{2} (63%)

The Enriquillo wetlands are a flooded grasslands and savannas ecoregion on the island of Hispaniola. They cover about 628 km^{2} (242 sq mi) around several low-lying lakes in southwestern Hispaniola in both the Dominican Republic and Haiti.

== Geography ==
The Enriquillo wetlands occupy a depression in the southwestern portion of the island, surrounding several lakes. The largest of the lakes is hyper-saline Lake Enriquillo in the Dominican Republic. The surface of Lake Enriquillo is about 44 meters below sea level. Other lakes include freshwater Rincón Lake in the Dominican Republic, and saltwater Etang Saumâtre and freshwater Trou Caïman in Haiti.

== Flora ==
Principal wetland plants around Lake Enriquillo are the buttonwood mangrove (Conocarpus erectus), cattails (Typha domingensis), saltwort (Batis maritima), and the purslane Sesuvium portulacastrum.

Dry scrublands surround the wetlands, part of the Hispaniolan dry forests ecoregion.

== Fauna ==
The wetlands are an important resting, feeding, and breeding location for migratory and resident birds, including the American flamingo (Phoenicopterus ruber) and roseate spoonbill (Platalea ajaja).

The wetlands are home to the island's largest population of American crocodile (Crocodylus acutus). Two Hispaniolan endemic iguanas, the rhinoceros iguana (Cyclura cornuta) and Ricord's iguana (C. ricordii), live in drier areas bordering the lake. Lake Rincón is important habitat for the Hispaniolan slider (Trachemys decorata) a species of turtle endemic to the island.

== Protected areas ==
397 km^{2}, or 63%, of the ecoregion is in protected areas.
