= Geography of Haiti =

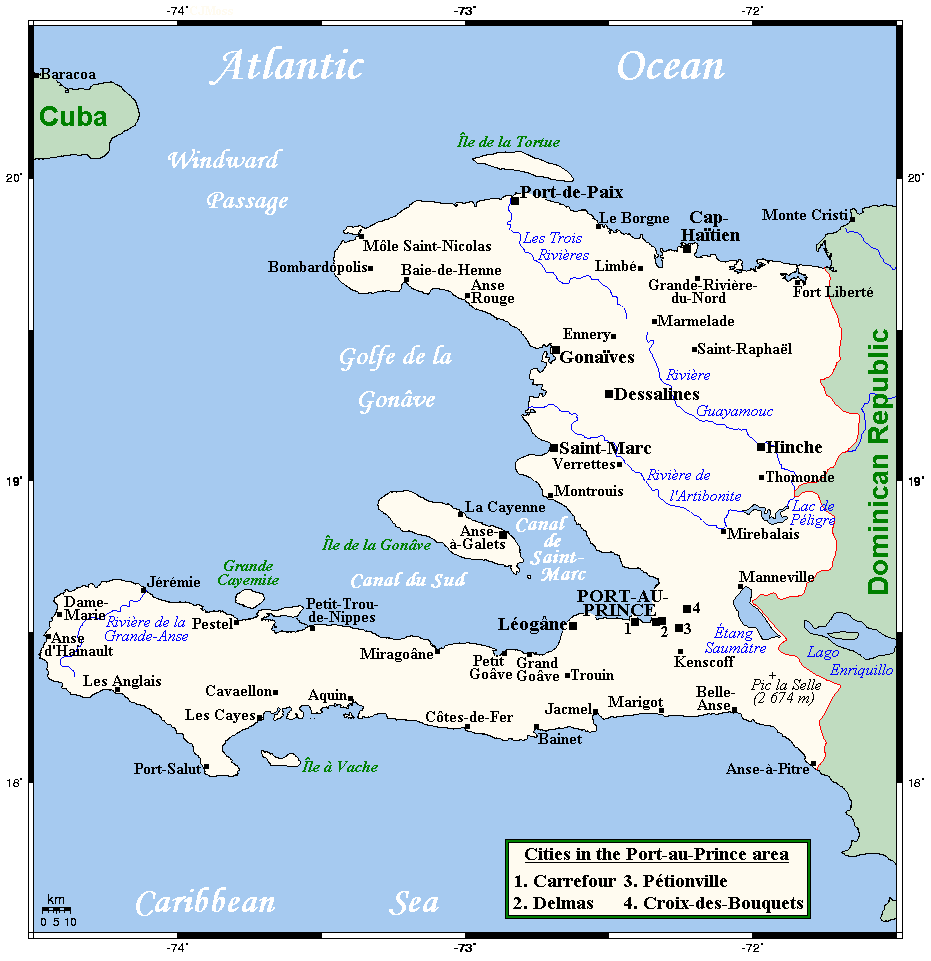
- Cities and rivers of Haiti

- Continent: Americas
- Region: Caribbean; Greater Antilles
- Coordinates: 19°00′N 72°25′W
- Area: Ranked 147th
  - Total: 27,750 km^{2} (10,710 sq mi)
- Coastline: 1,771 km (1,100 mi)
- Borders: Total land borders: 388 km
- Highest point: Pic la Selle; 2,680 m
- Lowest point: Caribbean Sea; 0 m
- Longest river: Artibonite River
- Largest lake: Étang Saumâtre
- Exclusive economic zone: 126,760 km^{2} (48,940 mi^{2})

The Republic of Haiti comprises the western three-eighths of the island of Hispaniola, west of the Dominican Republic. Haiti is positioned east of the neighboring island of Cuba, between the Caribbean Sea and the North Atlantic Ocean.

Haiti's total area is 27,750 square kilometres (10,714 sq mi), of which 27,560 square kilometres (10,641 sq mi) is land and 190 square kilometres (73 sq mi) is water. Haiti has 1,771 km (1,100 mi) of coastline and a 360 kilometres (224 mi)-border with the Dominican Republic.

== Climate ==
Köppen climate types of Haiti

The climate is tropical with some variation depending on altitude. Port-au-Prince ranges in January from an average minimum of 23 °C (73.4 °F) to an average maximum of 31 °C (87.8 °F); in July, from 25–35 °C (77–95 °F). The rainfall pattern is varied, with rain heavier in some of the lowlands and on the northern and eastern slopes of the mountains.

Port-au-Prince receives an average annual rainfall of 1,370 mm (53.9 in). There are two rainy seasons, April–June and October–November. Haiti is subject to periodic droughts and floods, made more severe by deforestation. Atlantic hurricanes are also a menace. For example, Hurricane Matthew caused large amounts of damage when it hit Haiti in 2016.

Climate data for Port-au-Prince
Month	Jan	Feb	Mar	Apr	May	Jun	Jul	Aug	Sep	Oct	Nov	Dec	Year
Mean daily maximum °C (°F)	31 (88)	31 (88)	32 (90)	32 (90)	33 (91)	35 (95)	35 (95)	35 (95)	34 (93)	33 (91)	32 (90)	31 (88)	33 (91)
Daily mean °C (°F)	27 (81)	26.5 (79.7)	27 (81)	28 (82)	28 (82)	30 (86)	30 (86)	29.5 (85.1)	28 (82)	28 (82)	27 (81)	26.5 (79.7)	28.0 (82.3)
Mean daily minimum °C (°F)	23 (73)	22 (72)	22 (72)	23 (73)	23 (73)	24 (75)	25 (77)	24 (75)	24 (75)	24 (75)	23 (73)	22 (72)	23 (74)
Average rainfall mm (inches)	33 (1.3)	58 (2.3)	86 (3.4)	160 (6.3)	231 (9.1)	102 (4.0)	74 (2.9)	145 (5.7)	175 (6.9)	170 (6.7)	86 (3.4)	33 (1.3)	1,353 (53.3)
Average rainy days (≥ 1 mm)	3	5	7	11	13	8	7	11	12	12	7	3	99
Mean monthly sunshine hours	279.0	254.2	279.0	273.0	251.1	237.0	279.0	282.1	246.0	251.1	240.0	244.9	3,116.4
Source: Climate & Temperature

== Physical geography ==
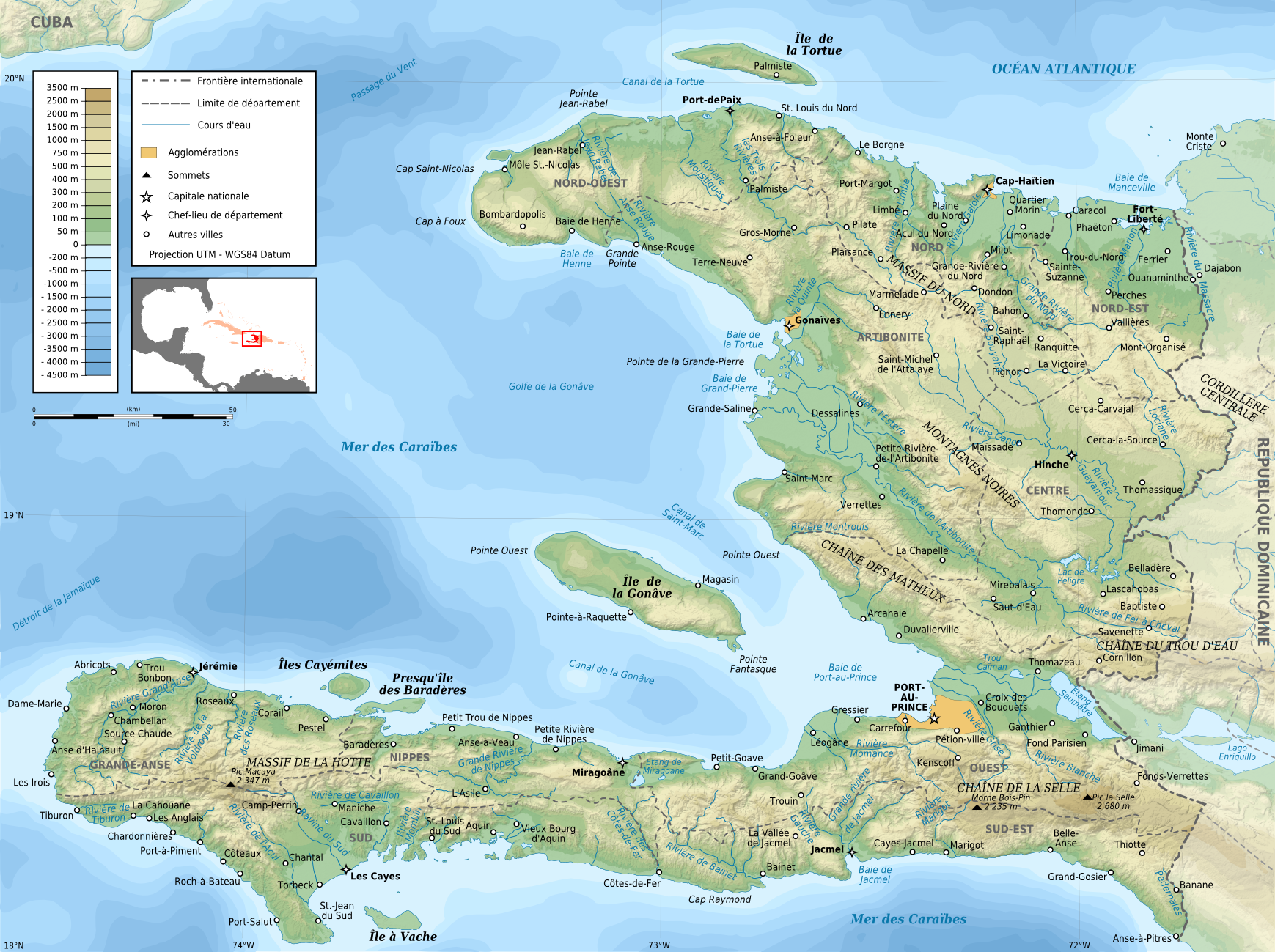
Topographic map of Haiti with labels

Haiti's terrain varies, with more than three fourths of the territory above 700 feet (210 m). Its climate is predominantly tropical, with some smaller areas of semi-arid, subtropical, and oceanic climate. Fertile valleys are interspersed between the mountain ranges forming vast areas of contrast between elevations in many areas throughout the territory. Haiti (and Hispaniola) are separated from Cuba by way of the Windward Passage, a 45 nmi (83 km; 52 mi) wide strait that passes between the two countries.

Haiti's lowest elevation is reported by one source to be sea level (the Caribbean Sea), by another source to be below sea level (Gheskio clinic, Port-au-Prince or in Gonaïves, <-1m), while its highest point is Pic la Selle at 2,680 m (8,793 ft).

- Haiti's most important valley in terms of crops is the Plaine de l'Artibonite, which is oriented south of the Montagnes Noires. This region supports the country's (also Hispaniola's) longest river, the Fleuve Artibonite whose watershed begins in the western region of the Dominican Republic and continues most of its length through central Haiti and onward where it empties into the Gulf of Gonâve. The river is navigable for a distance by barge. The eastern and central region of the island is a large elevated plateau.
- The northern region consists of the Massif du Nord (Northern Massif) and the Plaine du Nord (Northern Plain). The Massif du Nord is an extension of the Cordillera Central in the Dominican Republic. It begins at Haiti's eastern border, north of the Guayamouc River, and extends to the northwest through the northern peninsula. The Plateau Central (Central Plateau) extends along both sides of the Guayamouc River, south of the Massif du Nord. It runs from the southeast to the northwest. To the southwest of the Plateau Central are the Montagnes Noires, whose most northwestern part merges with the Massif du Nord.
- The southern region consists of the Plaine du Cul-de-Sac (the southeast) and the mountainous southern peninsula (also known as the Tiburon Peninsula). The Plaine du Cul-de-Sac is a natural depression which harbors the country's saline lakes, such as Trou Caïman and Haiti's largest lake Lac Azuei (also known as Étang Saumâtre). The Chaîne de la Selle mountain range, an extension of the southern mountain chain of the Dominican Republic (the Sierra de Baoruco), extends from the Massif de la Selle in the east to the Massif de la Hotte in the west. This mountain range harbors Pic la Selle, the highest point in Haiti at 2,680 metres (8,793 ft).

== Islands ==
Numerous smaller islands make up a part of Haiti's total territory. The most notable islands are:

1. Île de la Gonâve, the largest offshore island of mainland Hispaniola, is located to the west-northwest of Port-au-Prince in Haiti's Gulf of Gonâve, in the Caribbean Sea (the largest gulf of the Antilles). It has an area of 743 km^{2}. Its Taíno name was Guanabo. La Gonâve was once a pirate base.
2. Tortuga (Turtle), is the second largest offshore island of the mainland, located off the northwest coast of Hispaniola. It has an area of 180 km^{2}. The island was a major center of Caribbean piracy during the 17th century and has become famous in many works of literature and film. The island's name derives from the turtle-like shape of the island.
3. Île à Vache (Cow Island) is a small and lush Caribbean island located off southwestern of Haiti with a total area of 52 km^{2}.
4. Les Cayemites, a pair of islands located in the Gulf of Gonâve off the coast of southwest Hispaniola. It has a combined area of 45 km^{2}.
5. La Navasse, is a rocky outcropping that has been subject to an ongoing territorial dispute with the United States. The island is located 40 nautical miles (46 mi; 74 km) west of Jérémie on the south west peninsula of Haiti, and measures 2 square miles (5.2 km^{2}).

Haiti also has several lakes. The largest lake in Haiti, and the second largest lake of the island of Hispaniola and the West Indies, is Lake Azuei. It is located in the Cul-de-Sac Depression with an area of 170 km^{2}. It is a saline lake with a higher concentration of salt than the sea water and harbors numerous fauna such as American crocodiles and American flamingos.

Lake Péligre is an artificial lake created by the construction of the Péligre Hydroelectric Dam.

Trou Caïman is a saltwater lake with a total area of 16.2 km^{2}. Lake Miragoâne is one of the largest natural freshwater lakes in the Caribbean, with an area of 25 km^{2}.

== Statistics ==
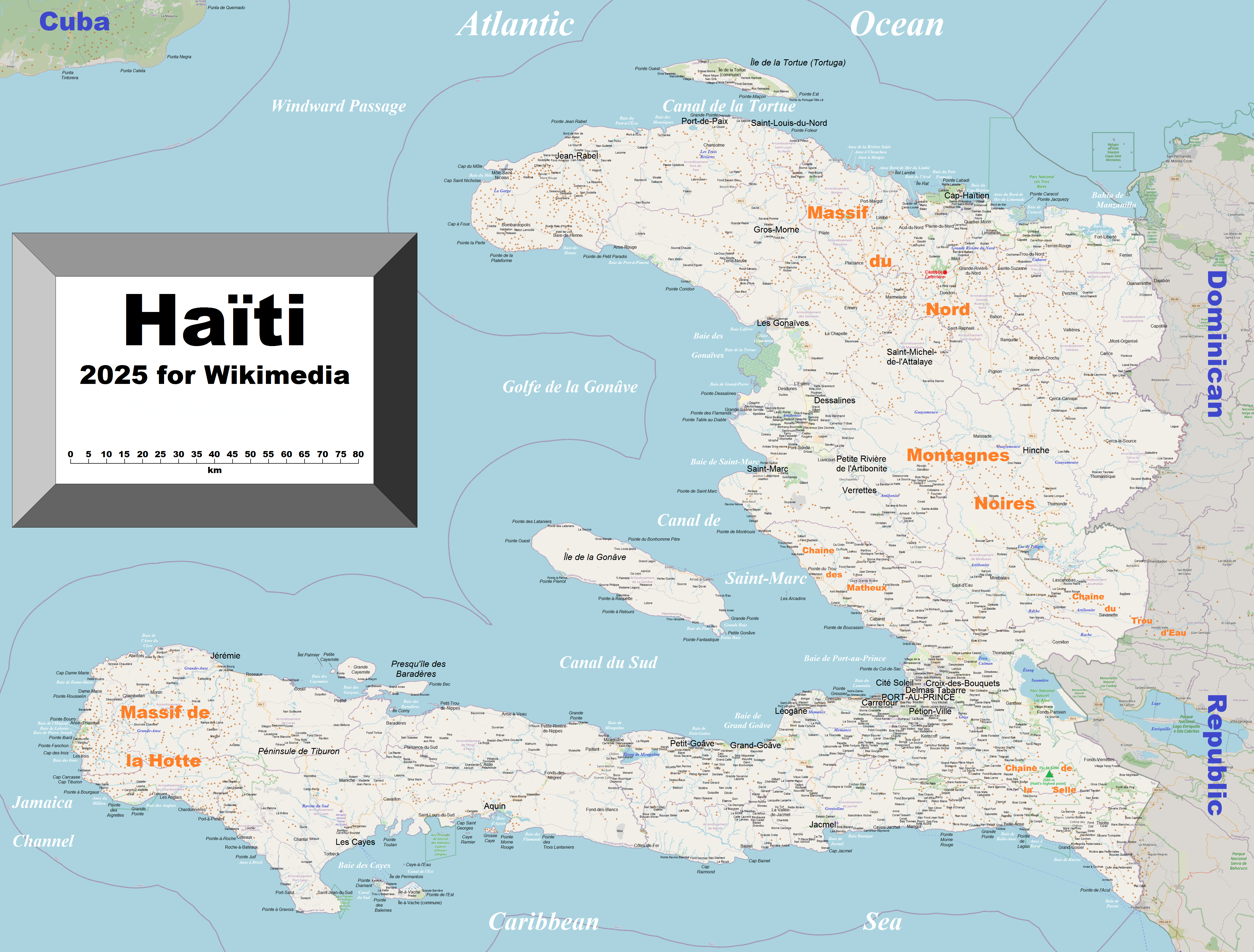
Detailed map of Haiti

Maritime claims
- Territorial sea: 12 nmi (22.2 km; 13.8 mi)
- Contiguous zone: 24 nmi (44.4 km; 27.6 mi)
- Exclusive economic zone: 126,760 km^{2} (48,940 mi^{2}) and 200 nmi (370.4 km; 230.2 mi)
- Continental shelf: to depth of exploitation

Climate
Tropical; semiarid where mountains in east cut off trade winds
Terrain
Mostly rough and mountainous

Natural resources
Bauxite, copper, calcium carbonate, gold, marble, hydropower, arable land
Land use
- Arable land: 36.28%
- Permanent crops: 10.16%
- Other: 53.56% (2012 est.)
Irrigated land
970 km^{3}
Total renewable water resources
14.03 km^{3} (2011)
Freshwater withdrawal (domestic/industrial/agricultural)
- Total: 1.2 km^{3}/yr (17%/3%/80%)
- Per capita: 134.3 m^{3}/yr (2009)
Natural hazards
Lies in the middle of the hurricane belt and subject to severe storms from June to October; occasional flooding and earthquakes; periodic droughts
Extreme points
- Northernmost point – Pointe Tete de Chien, Tortuga Island, Nord-Ouest Department
- Southernmost point – south of Torbeck, Les Cayes Arrondissement
- Westernmost point – cape near Anse d'Hainault, Grand'Anse
- Easternmost point – border with Dominican Republic, Centre Department
- Highest point – Pic la Selle: 2680 m
- Lowest point – Caribbean Sea: 0 m
Environment—current issues
Extensive deforestation (much of the remaining forested land is being cleared for agriculture and used as fuel); soil erosion; inadequate supplies of potable water
Environment—international agreements
- Party to: Biodiversity, Climate Change, Desertification, Law of the Sea, Marine Dumping, Marine Life Conservation, Ozone Layer Protection
- Signed, but not ratified: Hazardous Wastes

== See also ==
- Environment of Haiti
