= Rivière Blanche (Ouest) =

Coordinates: 18°36′27″N 72°03′20″W

Location
- Country: Haiti

Physical characteristics
- Length: 100 km (62 mi)

Rivière Blanche (French pronunciation: [ʁivjɛʁ blɑ̃ʃ], lit. 'White River') is a river in Haiti in the Ouest department. Downstream, one arm is channeled towards the Étang Saumâtre, another joined the Canal Boucanbrou and the Trou Caïman.

== Geography ==
Rivière Blanche has its source around the Pic la Selle, which rises to 2,680 meters above sea level, overlooking the mountains of peak. This river forms several arms when it arrives in the Plain of the Cul-de-Sac.

In the past, the Rivière Blanche flowed into lakes whose arms are channeled either to the northeast of the Étang Saumâtre, or to the northwest of the Trou Caïman. The former name for this was called the Rivière du Boucan Brou, however today, these arms are channeled under the name Boucanbrou or the Canal Boucambrou.

During the rainy season, the Rivière Blanche becomes impetuous and overflows its banks, especially because the Canal Boucanbrou is not curetted and clear of the mud that reduces the flow of water. It floods partly in the Plaine of the Cul-de-Sac in the east of the agglomeration of Port-au-Prince.

== Canalization of the river ==
In 1954, Hurricane Hazel moved large sedimentary land in the valley of the Rivière Blanche, forming a sediment dam spanning 192 km^{2} and diverting the course of the Rivière Blanche from its natural bed. Its waters found an outlet downstream in the flowing direction of the Étang Saumâtre. In January 2014, a Memorandum of Understanding between the Ministry of Agriculture and the National Association of Agricultural Producers was signed, to correct the alignment of the Rivière Blanche to re-groove its original channel over a length of 5.5 km long, and by harnessing to strengthen this part of the river course weak.

A warning system in case of floods, was set up in the town of Croix-des-Bouquets, to prevent the risk of flooding.
