= Jimaní =

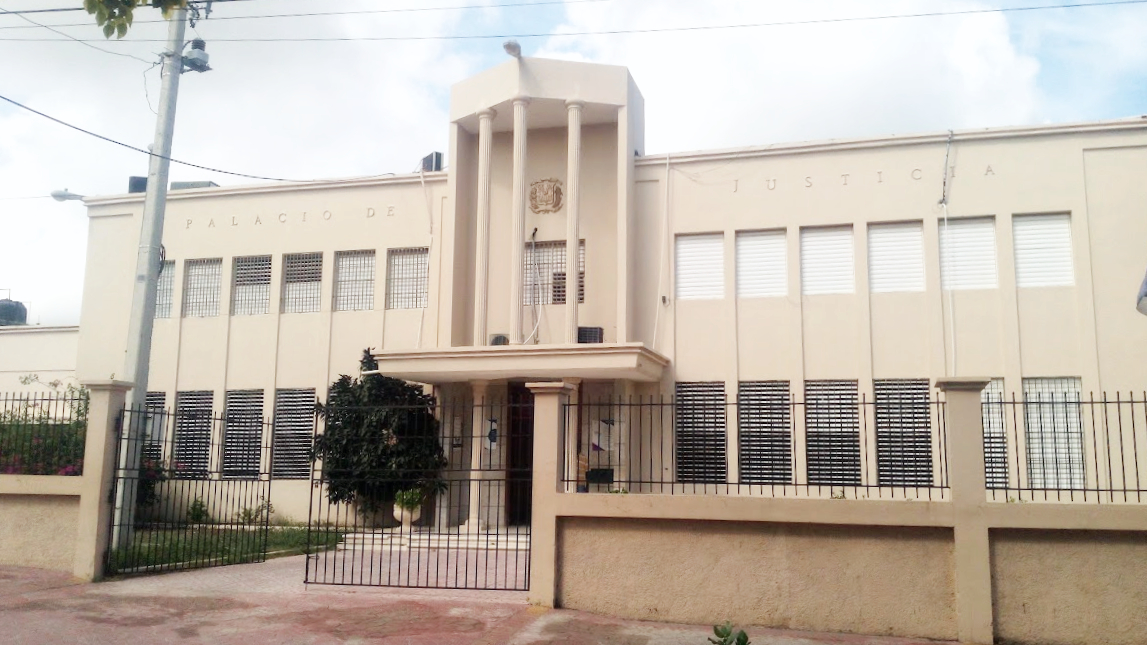

- Location within the Dominican Republic
- Coordinates: 18°29′24″N 71°51′0″W
- Country: Dominican Republic
- Province: Independencia
- Municipality since: 1945

Area
  - Total: 472.5 km^{2} (182.4 sq mi)
- Elevation: 31 m (102 ft)

Population (2012)
  - Total: 13,752
  - Density: 29.10/km^{2} (75.38/sq mi)
  - Urban: 7,155
- Distance to – Santo Domingo: 280 km
- Municipal Districts: 2
- Climate: BSh

Jimaní is the capital and the second largest city of the Independencia Province of the Dominican Republic. It serves as one of the two main border crossings to Haiti (with Dajabón), with a duty-free open-air marketplace operating on the border with Haiti. The town suffered damages in the flash flood of May 25, 2004, which killed many citizens during the night and washed away hundreds of homes.

== History ==
The name "Ximani" is of native Taíno origin. Historian Rafael Leonidas Pérez y Pérez in his book "Annotations on the history of Jimaní", says that Ximani was a Cacique of the chieftainship of Xaragua who had control of the town that lied in the middle of the two lakes, Lake Enriquillo and Lake Azuei, as well as the pass that leads to Pic la Selle making it a strategical and important part of the island. The name "Ximaní" is recognized when the Spaniards signed a peace agreement with the natives through Enriquillo at "the Lagoon of Ximaní" in 1536.

Another version claims the name belongs to a French Count (Count of Jimaní). General Paul Decayette, the Conde de Jimani and member of the Court of Faustin Soulouque, invades through the north. He is confronted and beaten by the Dominican army in Sabana Larga near the town of Dajabón. The exact date was January 24, 1856. With this victory the Dominicans put an end to the 12 years Dominican-Haitian War, one of the longest wars of independence in the Western Hemisphere (though with intermissions). Pérez y Pérez clarifies however that this official, was called "of Jimani" because of him having owned that land, which was awarded to him during the expansion of the French occupation. The historian argues that the French did not occupy the west side of the island, particularly that territory, until the mid 18th century.

By the time of the Dominican War of Independence, Jimani was practically deserted with most of the fighting taking place in Neiba. After the independence of 1844 the earliest inhabitants of Jimaní came from various communities of the southwest, such as Neiba, Duvergé, El Estero, Las Salinas, Azua de Compostela, Santa Cruz de Barahona, and Haitian immigrants from the mountains that married or had common-law marriages with Dominicans, forming families in the most populous neighborhood of the community, known as Jimaní Viejo. By the 1930s Jimaní belonged to Neiba and in 1938 it became part of the commune of La Descubierta, forming a part of the Province of Baoruco.

On the 18 of March 1943, by means of the law number 229, Jimani was elevated to municipal district. On December 29, 1948, the province of Baoruco was split into two provinces, the west side receiving the name of Independence Province. On January 1, 1950, Jimani officially became the Capital of the new province Independencia.

== Climate ==
Lying in a valley in the rain shadow of the northeast trade winds, Jimaní has a hot semi-arid climate with relatively constant temperatures throughout the course of the year. Annual rainfall is bimodal, peaking in May and October; the dry season occurs from December through February.

Climate data for Jimaní (1991–2020)
Month	Jan	Feb	Mar	Apr	May	Jun	Jul	Aug	Sep	Oct	Nov	Dec	Year
Mean daily maximum °C (°F)	32.4 (90.3)	33.0 (91.4)	33.5 (92.3)	34.3 (93.7)	34.0 (93.2)	35.1 (95.2)	36.1 (97.0)	36.3 (97.3)	35.5 (95.9)	34.4 (93.9)	33.2 (91.8)	32.6 (90.7)	34.2 (93.6)
Daily mean °C (°F)	26.8 (80.2)	27.3 (81.1)	27.9 (82.2)	28.8 (83.8)	29.0 (84.2)	30.0 (86.0)	30.7 (87.3)	30.8 (87.4)	30.1 (86.2)	29.2 (84.6)	28.1 (82.6)	27.1 (80.8)	28.8 (83.8)
Mean daily minimum °C (°F)	21.1 (70.0)	21.6 (70.9)	22.2 (72.0)	23.3 (73.9)	24.0 (75.2)	24.9 (76.8)	25.2 (77.4)	25.3 (77.5)	24.6 (76.3)	24.1 (75.4)	22.9 (73.2)	21.6 (70.9)	23.4 (74.1)
Average precipitation mm (inches)	13.5 (0.53)	26.4 (1.04)	59.4 (2.34)	82.6 (3.25)	118.0 (4.65)	40.5 (1.59)	34.6 (1.36)	60.1 (2.37)	83.9 (3.30)	116.2 (4.57)	63.8 (2.51)	21.3 (0.84)	720.1 (28.35)
Source: NOAA

Climate data for Jimaní (1971-2000)
Month	Jan	Feb	Mar	Apr	May	Jun	Jul	Aug	Sep	Oct	Nov	Dec	Year
Record high °C (°F)	35.6 (96.1)	36.0 (96.8)	38.0 (100.4)	37.6 (99.7)	38.4 (101.1)	39.2 (102.6)	39.4 (102.9)	39.8 (103.6)	40.2 (104.4)	38.4 (101.1)	37.5 (99.5)	35.0 (95.0)	40.2 (104.4)
Mean daily maximum °C (°F)	32.0 (89.6)	32.4 (90.3)	33.1 (91.6)	33.7 (92.7)	33.7 (92.7)	34.5 (94.1)	35.5 (95.9)	35.4 (95.7)	34.9 (94.8)	34.0 (93.2)	32.9 (91.2)	32.1 (89.8)	33.7 (92.6)
Daily mean °C (°F)	26.1 (79.0)	26.4 (79.5)	27.2 (81.0)	27.9 (82.2)	28.3 (82.9)	29.2 (84.6)	29.8 (85.6)	29.7 (85.5)	29.2 (84.6)	28.5 (83.3)	27.4 (81.3)	26.2 (79.2)	28.0 (82.4)
Mean daily minimum °C (°F)	20.1 (68.2)	20.5 (68.9)	21.3 (70.3)	22.2 (72.0)	22.9 (73.2)	23.9 (75.0)	24.0 (75.2)	24.0 (75.2)	23.6 (74.5)	23.0 (73.4)	21.9 (71.4)	20.4 (68.7)	22.3 (72.2)
Record low °C (°F)	13.8 (56.8)	15.3 (59.5)	16.8 (62.2)	17.5 (63.5)	18.6 (65.5)	19.2 (66.6)	19.2 (66.6)	19.5 (67.1)	19.0 (66.2)	18.5 (65.3)	15.6 (60.1)	12.0 (53.6)	12.0 (53.6)
Average rainfall mm (inches)	16.7 (0.66)	31.3 (1.23)	54.1 (2.13)	83.1 (3.27)	128.5 (5.06)	42.7 (1.68)	24.2 (0.95)	57.0 (2.24)	93.1 (3.67)	95.1 (3.74)	57.9 (2.28)	16.2 (0.64)	699.9 (27.55)
Average rainy days (≥ 1.0 mm)	2.0	3.2	5.1	6.7	8.6	3.9	3.2	4.8	6.8	8.1	4.8	1.6	58.8
Average relative humidity (%)	64.0	62.6	61.8	62.5	66.2	63.0	59.8	61.2	64.3	66.9	67.9	65.1	63.8
Mean monthly sunshine hours	222.9	217.0	239.6	232.7	222.9	234.2	240.2	241.2	209.3	223.2	216.5	229.1	2,728.8
Source: ONAMET

Climate data for Jimaní (1961-1990)
Month	Jan	Feb	Mar	Apr	May	Jun	Jul	Aug	Sep	Oct	Nov	Dec	Year
Record high °C (°F)	37.0 (98.6)	37.0 (98.6)	38.0 (100.4)	38.0 (100.4)	38.0 (100.4)	39.2 (102.6)	39.5 (103.1)	39.3 (102.7)	39.8 (103.6)	38.2 (100.8)	37.5 (99.5)	36.0 (96.8)	39.8 (103.6)
Mean daily maximum °C (°F)	32.0 (89.6)	32.5 (90.5)	33.4 (92.1)	33.8 (92.8)	33.7 (92.7)	34.2 (93.6)	35.3 (95.5)	35.2 (95.4)	34.9 (94.8)	33.9 (93.0)	33.0 (91.4)	32.2 (90.0)	33.7 (92.7)
Daily mean °C (°F)	26.0 (78.8)	26.4 (79.5)	27.3 (81.1)	27.9 (82.2)	28.1 (82.6)	28.9 (84.0)	29.6 (85.3)	29.4 (84.9)	29.1 (84.4)	28.3 (82.9)	27.3 (81.1)	26.2 (79.2)	27.9 (82.2)
Mean daily minimum °C (°F)	20.0 (68.0)	20.4 (68.7)	21.1 (70.0)	22.0 (71.6)	22.7 (72.9)	23.6 (74.5)	23.8 (74.8)	23.6 (74.5)	23.3 (73.9)	22.8 (73.0)	21.7 (71.1)	20.2 (68.4)	22.1 (71.8)
Record low °C (°F)	15.0 (59.0)	15.3 (59.5)	16.8 (62.2)	17.0 (62.6)	18.6 (65.5)	19.2 (66.6)	18.0 (64.4)	19.5 (67.1)	19.0 (66.2)	18.5 (65.3)	15.6 (60.1)	12.0 (53.6)	12.0 (53.6)
Average rainfall mm (inches)	18.3 (0.72)	23.4 (0.92)	41.2 (1.62)	86.9 (3.42)	141.7 (5.58)	45.0 (1.77)	23.6 (0.93)	61.3 (2.41)	94.0 (3.70)	122.8 (4.83)	52.1 (2.05)	18.6 (0.73)	728.9 (28.70)
Average rainy days (≥ 1.0 mm)	2.0	2.5	4.1	7.0	8.9	4.5	2.9	4.6	6.6	8.7	4.5	1.5	57.8
Average relative humidity (%)	63.6	61.9	60.3	62.1	65.9	63.6	60.3	61.4	64.0	66.4	67.1	64.1	63.4
Mean monthly sunshine hours	239	233	257	251	239	254	259	262	226	242	231	246	2,936
Source 1: NOAA
Source 2: Acqweather (sun)

== Economy ==
Agriculture and commerce with Haiti represent the main economic activities of this municipality. In agriculture the main products are cassava, batata, melon, peppers, cilantro and tomatoes.

Jimaní has a popular duty-free open-air marketplace with Haiti that is also visited by people from adjoining towns and even from distant regions of the country. In this market, basic food products are sold, as well as foreign beverages, clothes, shoes, and new and used electrical appliances.

The customs zone of the border is called "The Door" and it is visited by foreign tourists that come to observe the dynamics of the business and intercultural and interracial relation between Dominicans and Haitians.

The municipal City Hall receives monthly RD$1,000,000 as mandated by the General Law of Budget, through the Dominican Municipal League. The authorities of the City Hall estimate the internal tax collection to be about $15,000 monthly.

The municipal districts El Limón and Boca de Cachón receive monthly $500,000 each one, from the transfer ordered by the law through the Dominican Municipal League.

There are two financial institutions in Jimaní. A branch office of the Reserve Bank and a branch office of the Cooperative of Savings and Credit of Neiba (Coopacrene).

== Education ==
There are six basic schools with two daily schedules and four public high schools, three of them for adults.

== Health ==
The municipality has a municipal hospital and four rural clinics or hospitals. The majority of the Jimanisenses prefer to seek medical attention in the Regional University Hospital Jaime Mota of Barahona.

== Culture and religion ==
Jimaní is mostly Catholic. Local holidays are celebrated March 19, in honor of their Saint San José. A carnival is being added to the Patronal Feast, to expand the celebration. Also being instituted is the celebration of a Cultural Week each year, in memory of the flood that destroyed a big part of the population in May 2004.

As a historic-cultural monument, Jimaní conserves intact and conditioned the "Mansion of Trujillo", one of many the dictator built in the border region, although he never spent the night in this particular one.

== Public works ==
Local governments have carried out different works for the community, such as the reconstruction and restructuring of the municipal cemetery, the reconstruction of street gutters, rehabilitation of electric lighting in the urban area and in the sector of Tierra Nueva. There are also ongoing projects to enlarge the aqueduct network for the neighborhoods of La Cu and El Cerro.

== Organizations ==
In Jimaní there are several community associations. For example, in each of the towns that conform the municipality there is an Association of Farmers as well as an Association of Mothers.

There is also a Lions Club, the Association of Minibuses Jimaní-Barahona, a committee that represents the Association of "Jimanisenses" in Massachusetts, US, a technical team of World Vision, Fundasur (Foundation of the South) and Conani (the National Council for Childhood and Adolescence).
