= Lake Enriquillo =

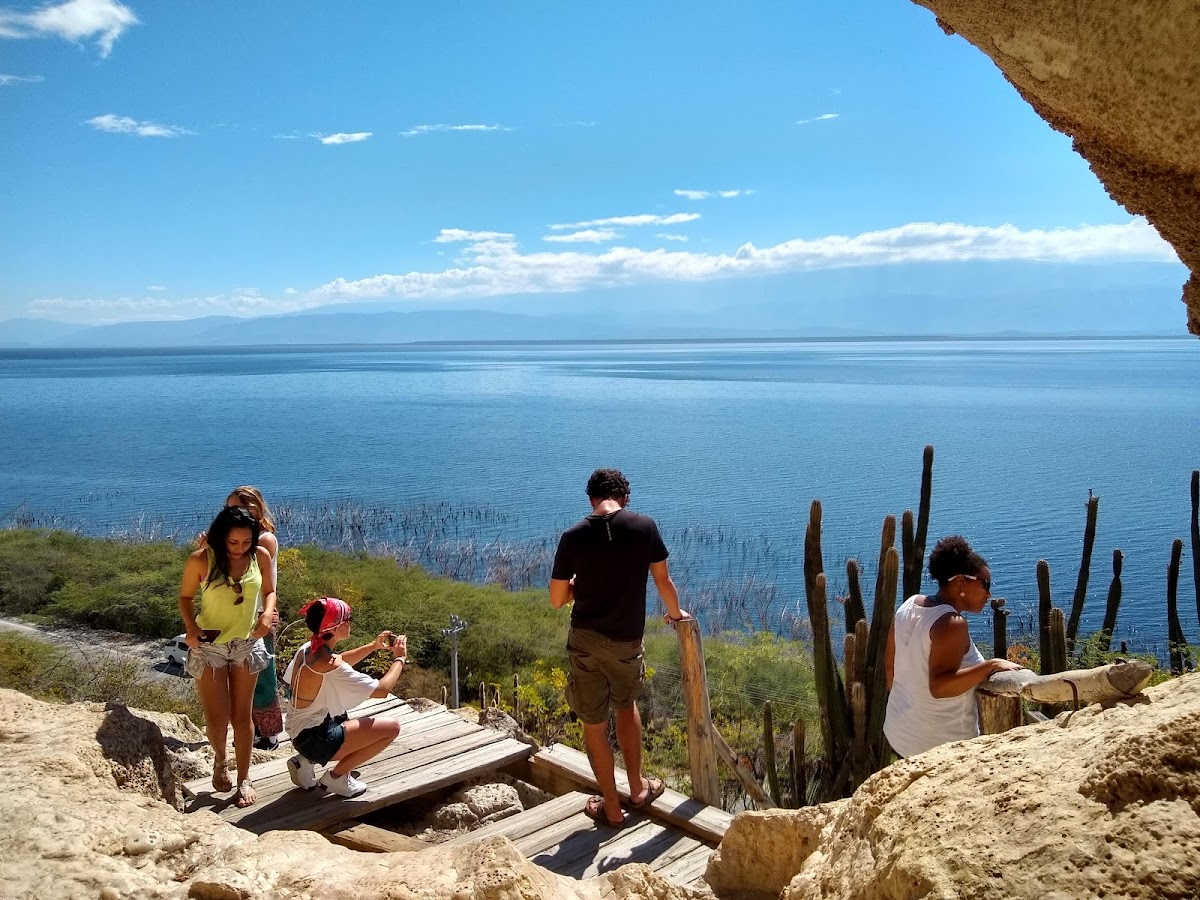
- View of Lake Enriquillo from Las Caritas

- Location within the Dominican Republic

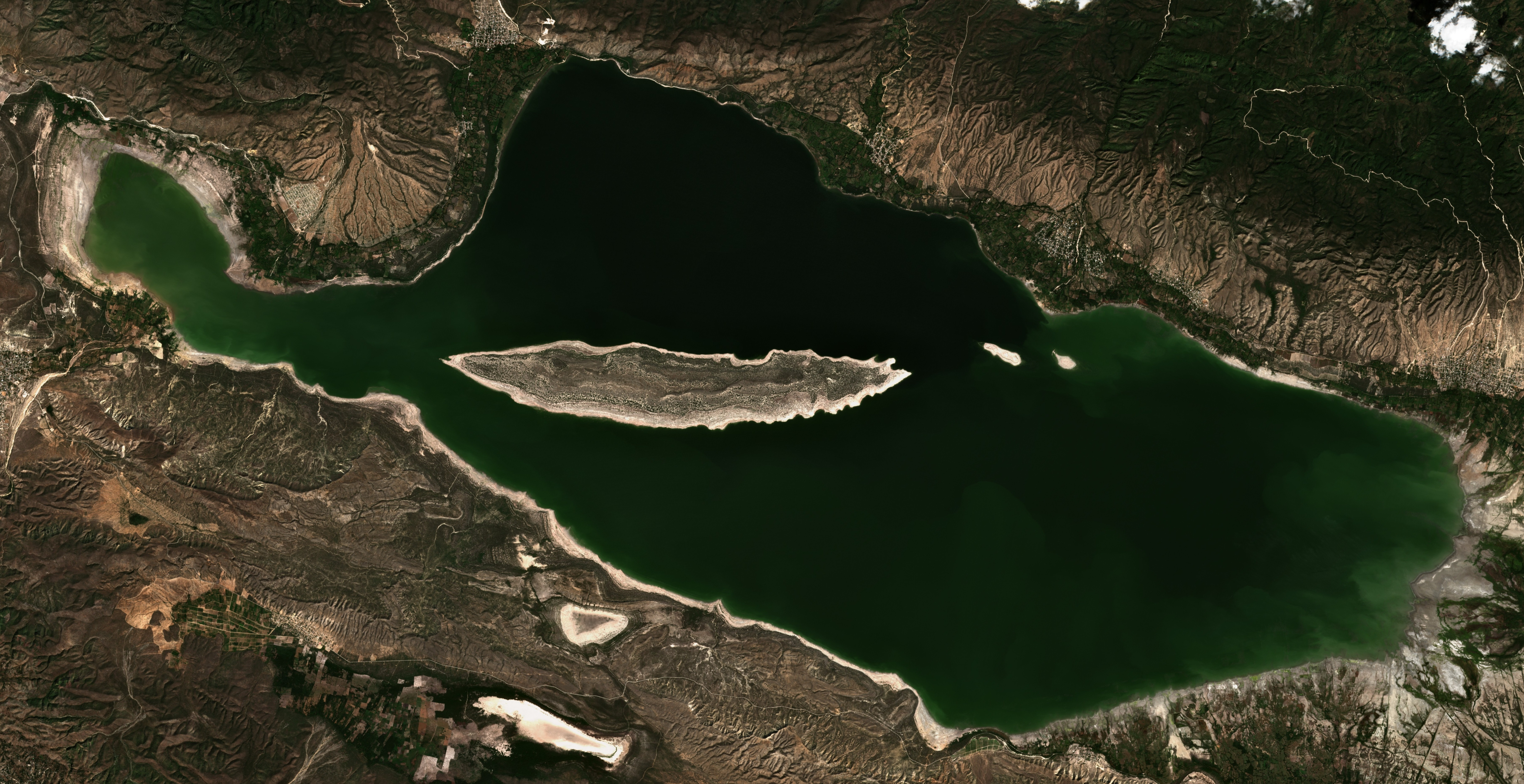
- A satellite image of the lake (February 2023)
- Location: Hoya de Enriquillo
- Coordinates: 18°30′N 71°35′W
- Lake type: saline lake
- Primary inflows: Yaque del Sur
- Primary outflows: evaporation
- Basin countries: Dominican Republic
- Surface area: 375 km^{2} (145 sq mi)
- Max. depth: 52 m (171 ft)
- Surface elevation: −46 m (−151 ft)
- Islands: Isla Cabritos (Two former islands submerged by December 2011)
- Settlements: Boca de Cachón, La Descubierta, Postrer Río, Neyba, Duvergé, Jimaní

Ramsar Wetland
- Official name: Lago Enriquillo
- Designated: 15 May 2002
- Reference no.: 1179

Lake Enriquillo (Spanish: Lago Enriquillo) is a hypersaline lake in the Dominican Republic located in the southwestern region of the country. Its waters are shared between the provinces of Bahoruco and Independencia, the latter of which borders Haiti. Lake Enriquillo is the largest lake in both the Dominican Republic and Hispaniola, as well as the entire Caribbean. It is also the lowest point for an island country.

== Hydrology ==
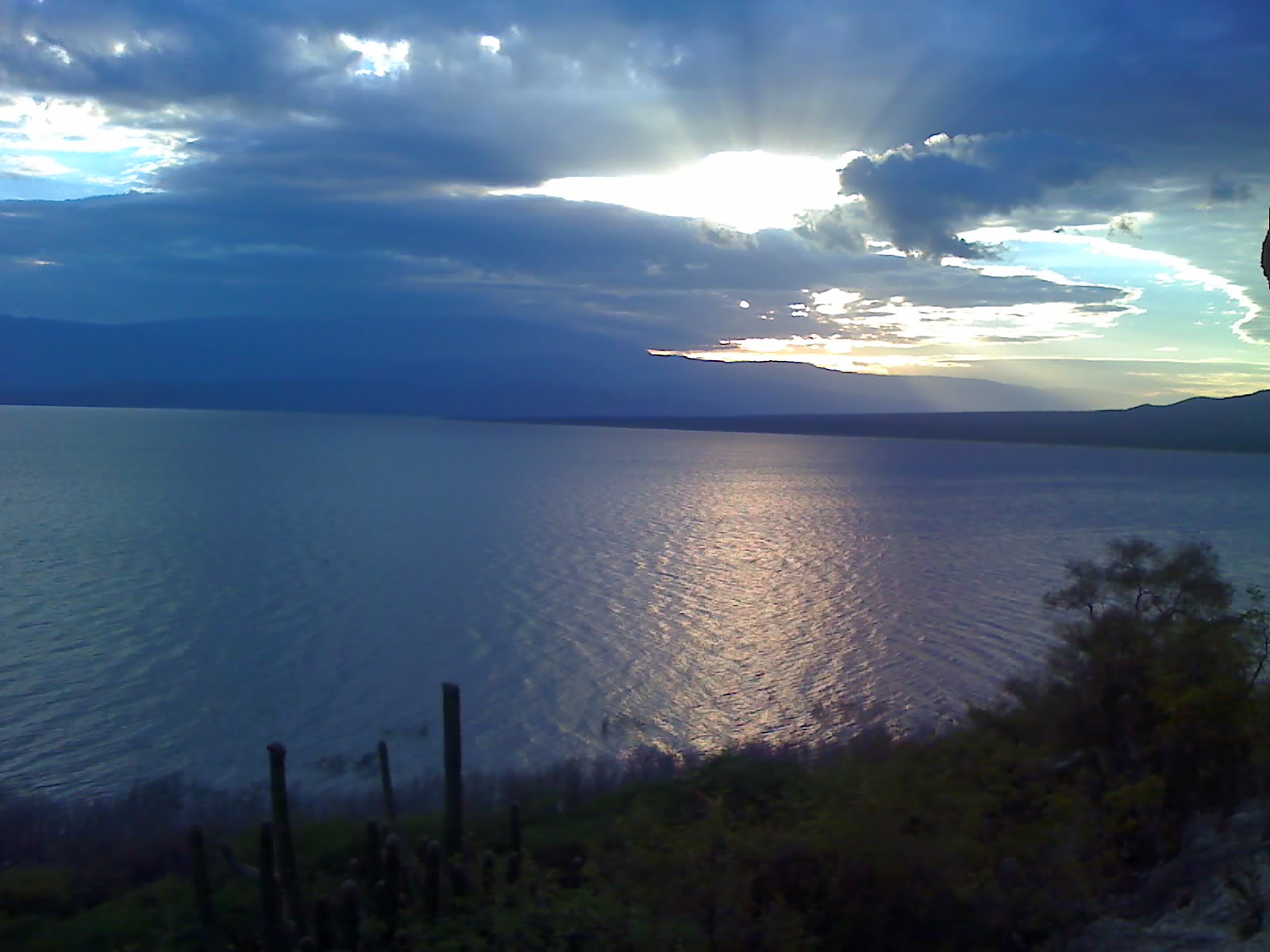
Lake Enriquillo seen from Las Caritas National Park, near La Descubierta

Lake Enriquillo covers an area of 380 km^{2} (150 sq mi), and is the lowest point for an island country, falling 46 m (151 ft) below sea level. Its drainage basin includes ten minor river systems. The rivers that rise in the Neiba Mountains to the north (lower center and lower right of the image) are perennial. Those rivers that rise in the Baoruco Mountains to the south are intermittent. Lake Enriquillo has no outlet, making it an example of an endorheic lake. The lake's water level varies because of a combination of storm-driven precipitation events and the region's high evaporation rate. Salinity in the lake can vary between 33 parts per thousand (comparable to seawater) and over 100 parts per thousand (hypersaline).

The region has a hot, semiarid climate. Annual rainfall is not evenly distributed, with peak precipitation occurring in May and October. The dry season is December through April when rainfall may be less than 20 mm (0.79 in). Due to the length of the lake, annual rainfall averages also vary at the eastern and western ends: 729 mm (28.7 in) on the northwest shore, and 508 mm (20.0 in) in the southeast.

=== Flooding trend ===
Between 2004 and 2009, the lake doubled its surface area. Records for 2004 show the lake to be 164 km^{2} (63 sq mi); measurements from 2011 put the area at 350 km^{2} (140 sq mi). (Note: In 2003 the lake was at its lowest level in more than 20 years.)

Reasons for the flooding are being debated, but may be a combination of several, including increases in rainfall in the region in recent years, increase of sediments going into the lake from run-off due to deforestation that are contributing to raising the lakebed, and milder temperatures, which are reducing the surface evaporation rate.

== Geography ==
The lake lies in a valley that stretches from near Port-au-Prince in Haiti to Bahia de Neiba in the Dominican Republic. The valley is known as the Hoya de Enriquillo in the Dominican Republic and as the Plain du Cul-de-Sac in Haiti. Parts of the depression are below sea level and are covered by large salt lakes, including Lake Enriquillo and Étang Saumâtre, Hispaniola's second largest lake (as well as Haiti's largest).

There historically were three islands in the lake: Barbarita, Islita, and Isla Cabritos. Once, when water levels dropped during dry spells, the islands were linked to one another by sandbars. As of December 2011, only Isla Cabritos remains; the other two islands were submerged by the rising levels of the lake.

== Geology ==
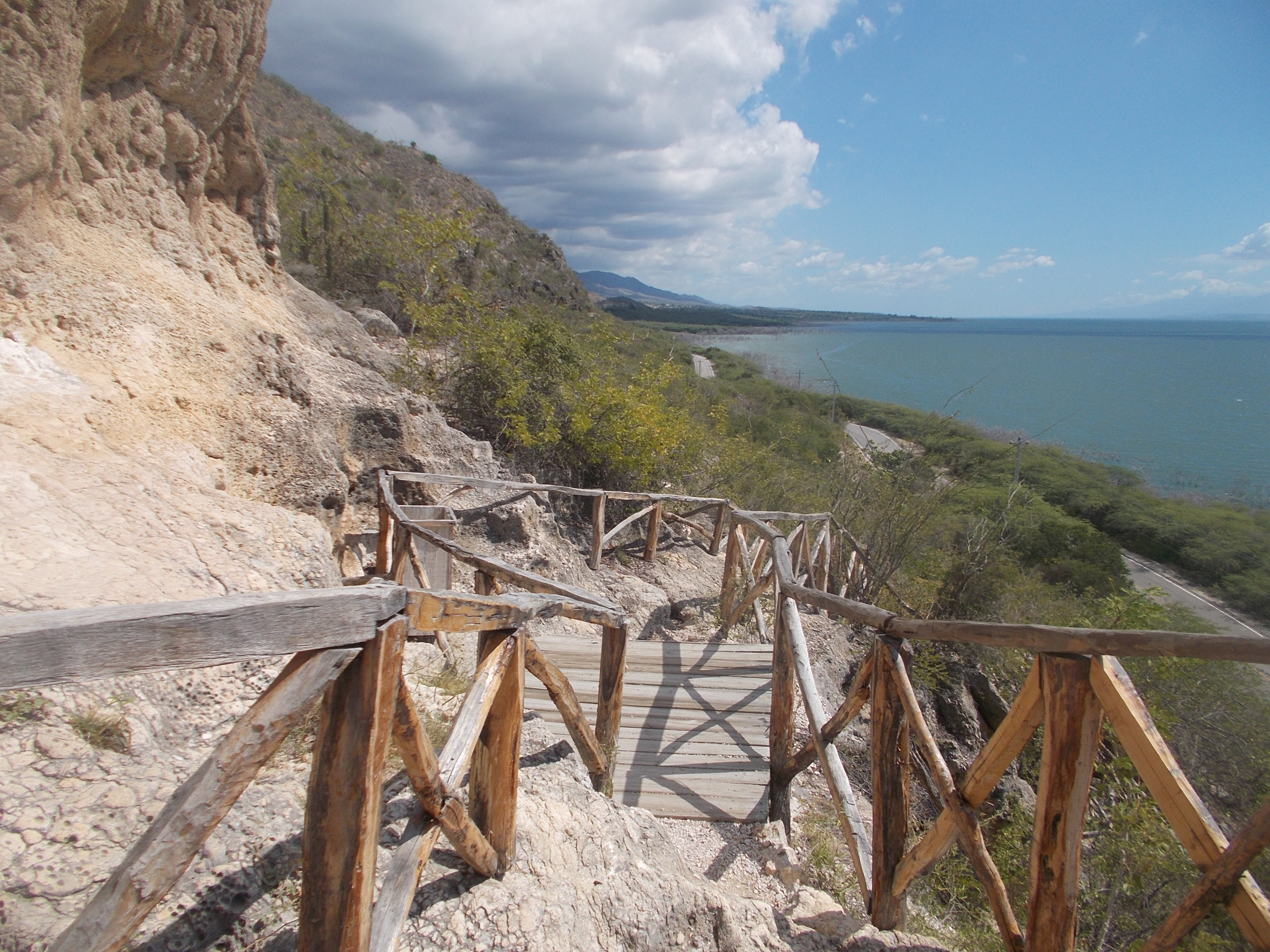
Las Caritas.

Lake Enriquillo is located within a linear depression that formed as a ramp basin between the Haiti fold and thrust belt to the north and the uplifted oceanic crust of the Massif de la Selle and Sierra de Bahoruco mountain ranges to the south. The Enriquillo-Plantain Garden fault is a later strike-slip fault, cutting across the depression, which extends from Jamaica in the west to near Neiba in the Dominican Republic in the east. (Note: This fault was responsible for the catastrophic 2010 Haiti earthquake.) The valley, a former marine strait, was created around one million years ago when the water level fell and the strait was filled in by sediments of the Yaque del Sur River. Due to this, tremors in the region are common.

== Ecology ==
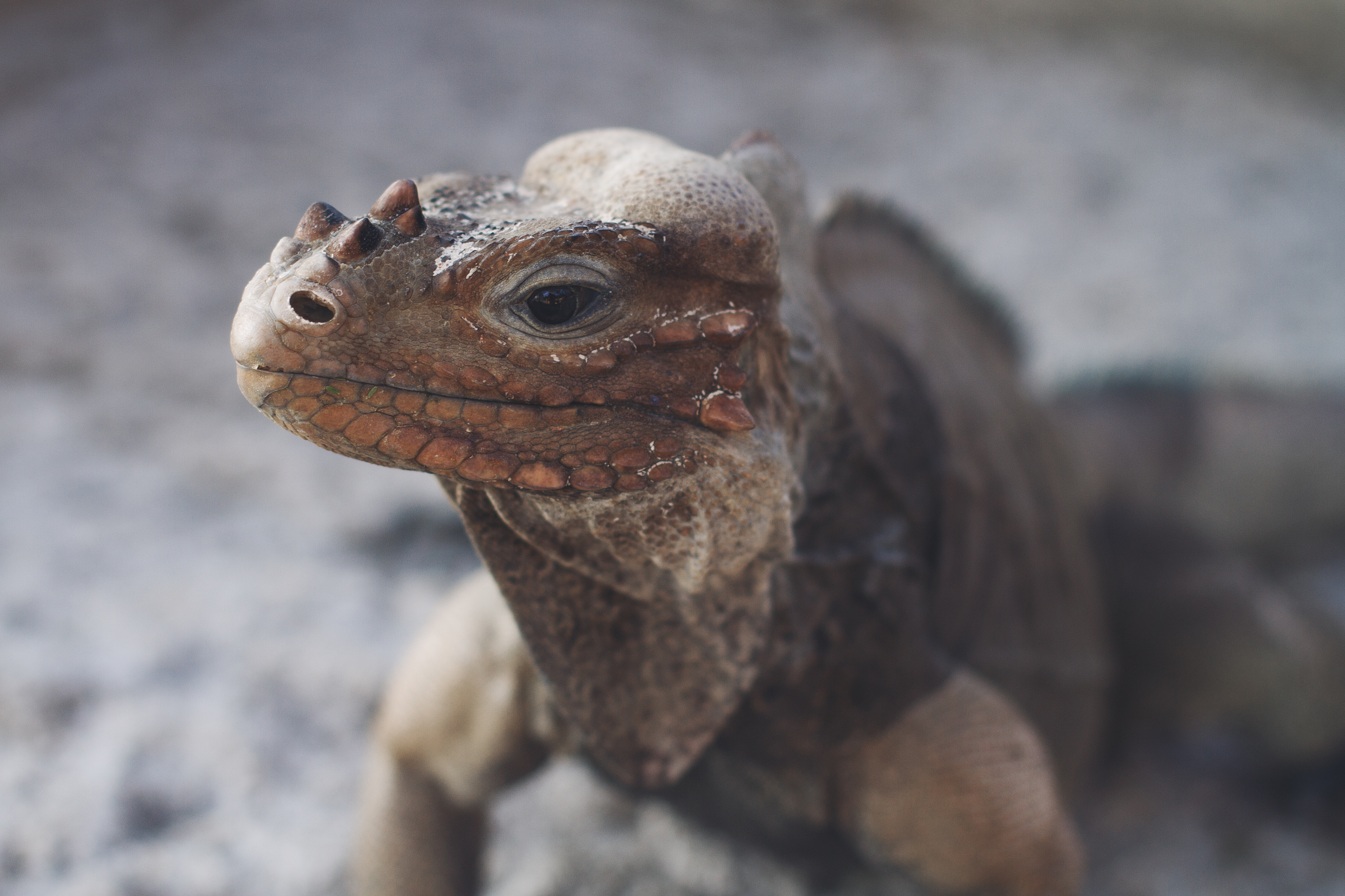
Rhinoceros iguana in Lake Enriquillo.

Lake Enriquillo is home to the largest population of American crocodiles (Crocodylus acutus) in the Caribbean. Three species of native fish inhabit the lake: the blackbanded limia (Limia melanonotata), the Hispaniolan gambusia (Gambusia hispaniolae), and the Hispaniola pupfish (Cyprinodon bondi). Two endangered iguanas endemic to Hispaniola live sympatrically on around the lake, as well as on Isla Cabritos: the Ricord's iguana (Cyclura ricordii), and the rhinoceros iguana (Cyclura cornuta). The endemic Hispaniola racer (Haitiophis anomalus), a snake, is also native to the area. Among the numerous bird species found at the lake, American flamingos (Phoenicopterus ruber) are prominent; flocks of flamingos are especially concentrated on Isla Cabritos and near the eastern end of the lake.

Plants that thrive in arid places, such as cacti (especially the endemic Melocactus lemairei), can be found here.

A national park was established in 1974 to preserve the area; in 2002 it was combined with two other parks to form the Jaragua-Bahoruco-Enriquillo Biosphere Reserve.

== History ==
The lake is named after Enriquillo, a cacique of the indigenous Taíno, who rebelled against the Spaniards in the early 16th century, and hid in the mountains south of the lake. It was previously called Lake Xaragua, after the Taino chiefdom in which it was located.

== Economy ==
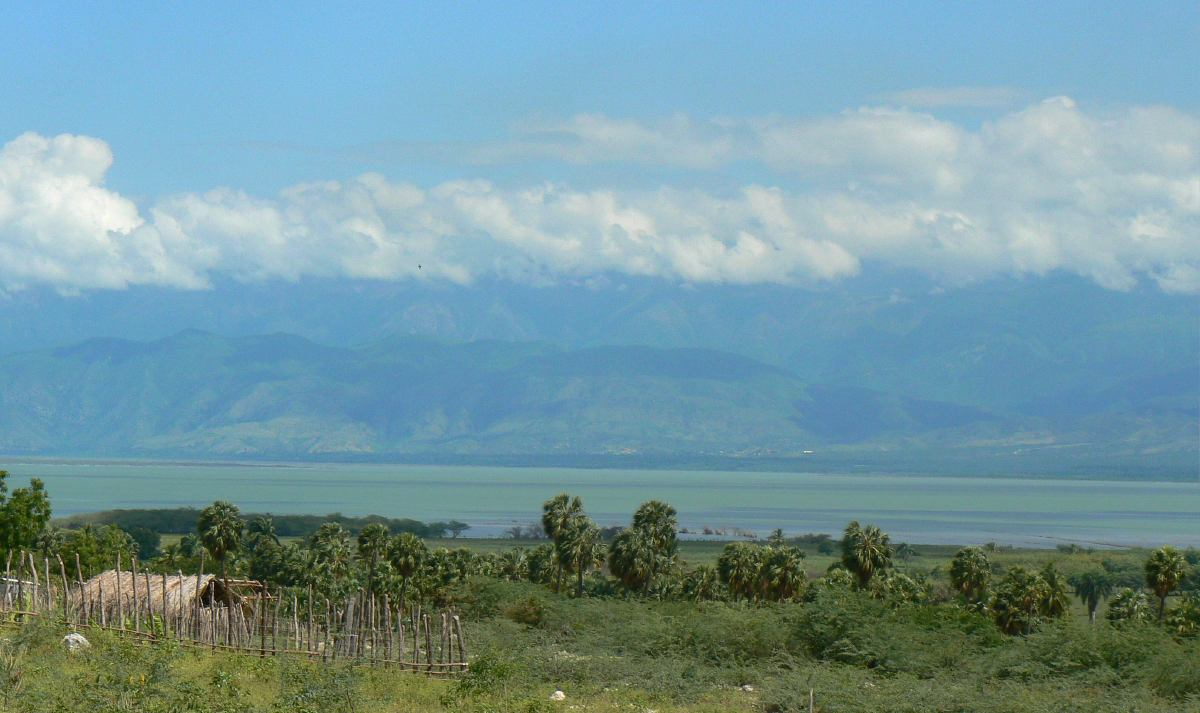
South shore of Lake Enriquillo, looking northward to the Sierra de Neiba mountains; Independencia Province, Dominican Republic

Land near Lake Enriquillo has long been used for agriculture, with crops such as bananas, sweet potatoes, and yuca being grown there, as well as pasture for cattle. The rising water levels have affected hundreds of nearby residents in townships bordering the lake, with abundant loss of agricultural land. (Note: A 2014 article cites a government estimate of 40,000 acres (16,000 ha) of agricultural land lost.)

Important towns near the shores of Enriquillo include Neiba, the capital of Baoruco Province, on the northeast, and Jimaní, the capital of Independencia Province, at the western end of the lake near the border with Haiti. La Descubierta is the town nearest to the entrance of Lago Enriquillo and Isla Cabritos National Park. The community of Boca de Cachon, near the lake and severely affected by the rising waters, has been the subject of government relocation efforts, including the construction of a new town further from the shores of Enriquillo.

Lake Enriquillo has become an important tourist destination, both for national and foreign tourism. There is a group of possibly pre-Taino indigenous petroglyphs (locally named "las caritas", "the faces"), from where there is a view of the lake. There are several small hotels in the nearby towns, usually used by travelers linked to commerce, and which are also used by tourists to see the attractions of the area. A transportation system with buses also links this community with Santo Domingo and other communities between them.
