= Trou Caïman =

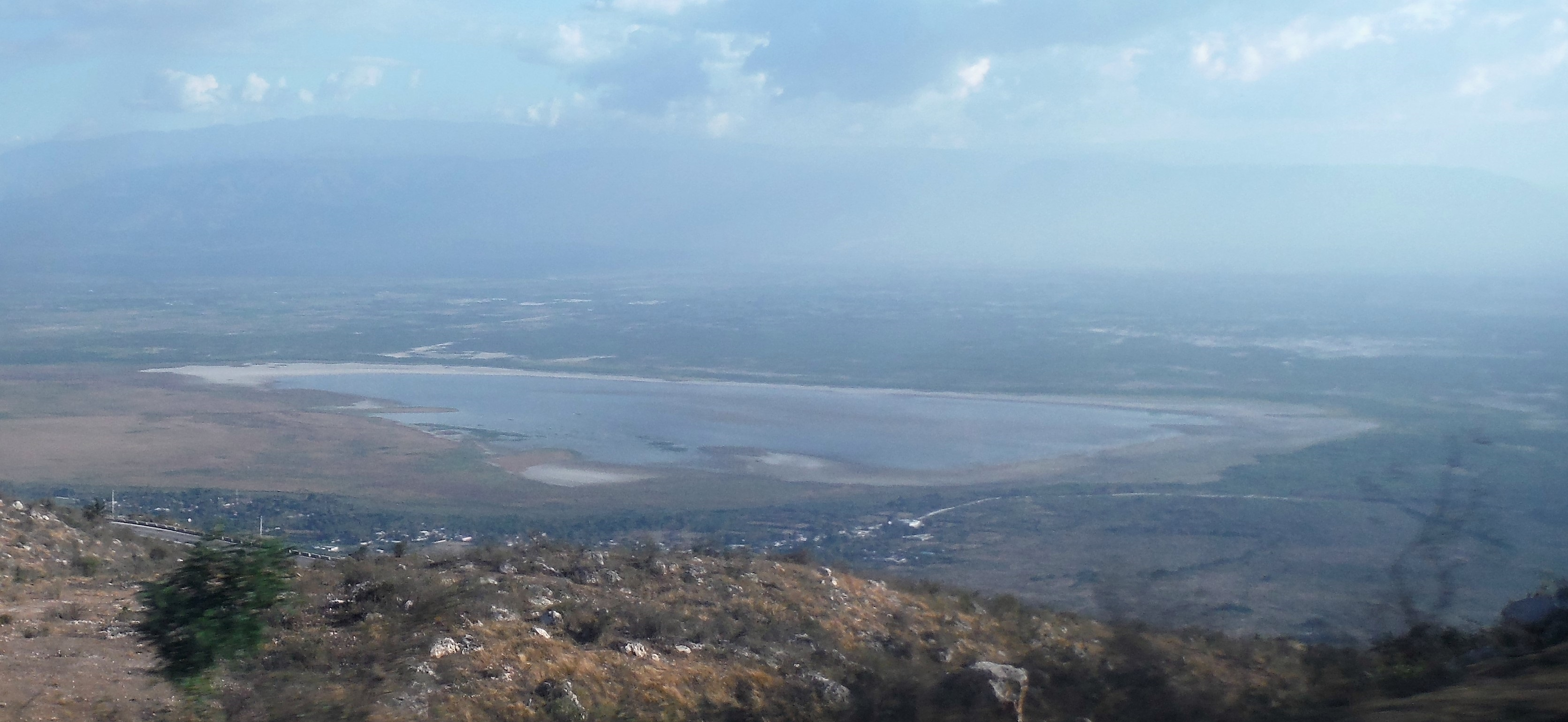

- Location within Haiti
- Location: Plaine du Cul-de-Sac
- Coordinates: 18°39′N 72°08′W
- Type: Saline lake
- Basin countries: Haiti
- Max. length: 9 km (5.6 mi)
- Max. width: 3 km (1.9 mi)
- Surface area: 16 km^{2} (6.2 sq mi)

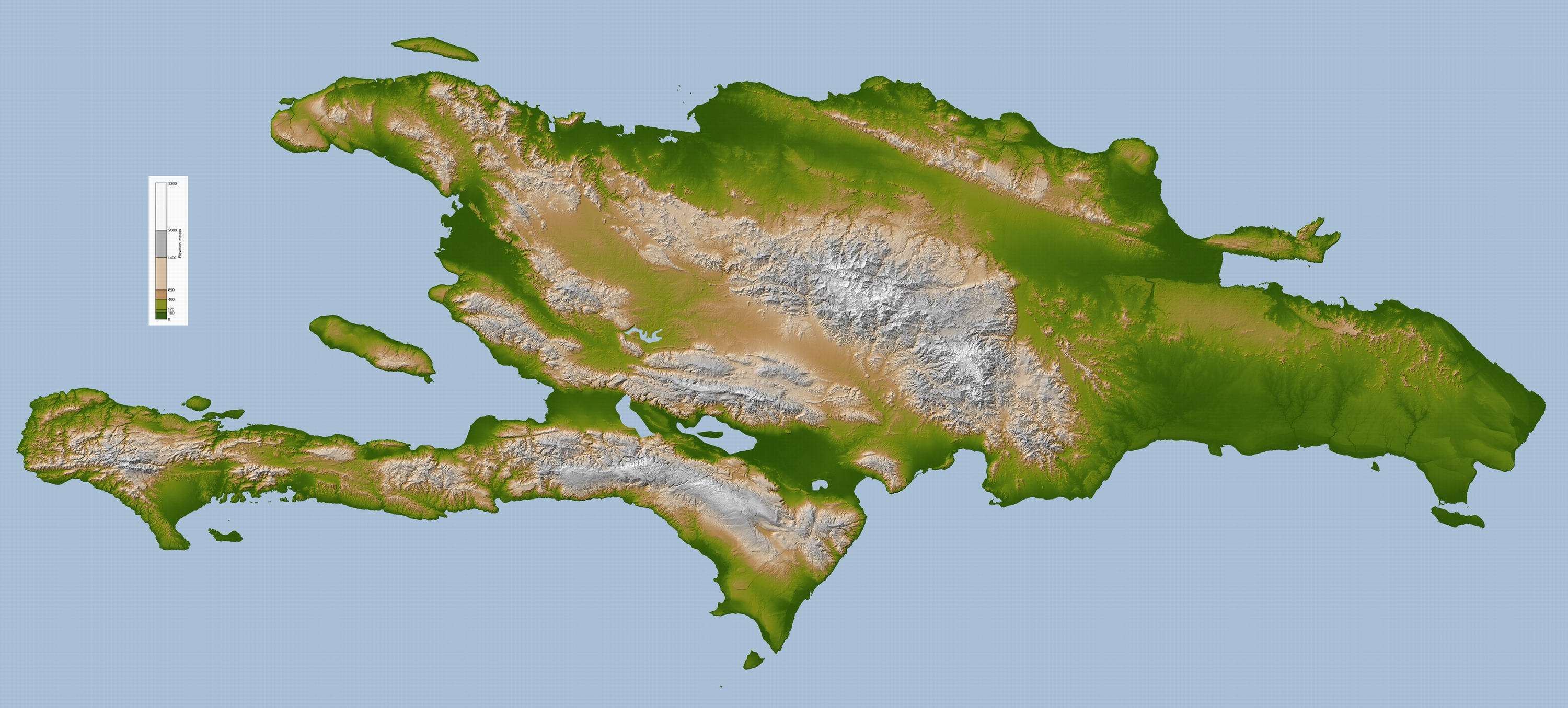
Topographic map of Hispaniola; the Trou Caïman is immediately west of the westernmost main lake

Trou Caïman (literally "Caiman's Hole" in French), sometimes called Eau Gallée by locals, is a saltwater lake in Haiti known for its excellent birdwatching opportunities.

== Description ==
The lake is 9 km (5.6 mi) long, 3 km (1.9 mi) wide, and approximately 16 km^{2} (6.2 sq mi) in area. It is located northeast of Croix-des-Bouquets in the Ouest department in the Plaine du Cul-de-Sac rift valley nearby much larger saline lakes, chiefly Lake Azuéi in Haiti east of which is Lake Enriquillo in the Dominican Republic.

The predominant headwater of the lake is at low level 10 kilometres (6.2 mi) east within the neater suburbs of Port-au-Prince, the country's capital. The lake is semi-endorheic as seasonally it overflows into a straightened channel which is shallow to the east into endorheic (with no outflow to the sea) Lake Azuéi.
