= Plain of the Cul-de-Sac =

Coordinates: 18°36′0″N 72°10′0″W

Location of Plain of the Cul-de-Sac

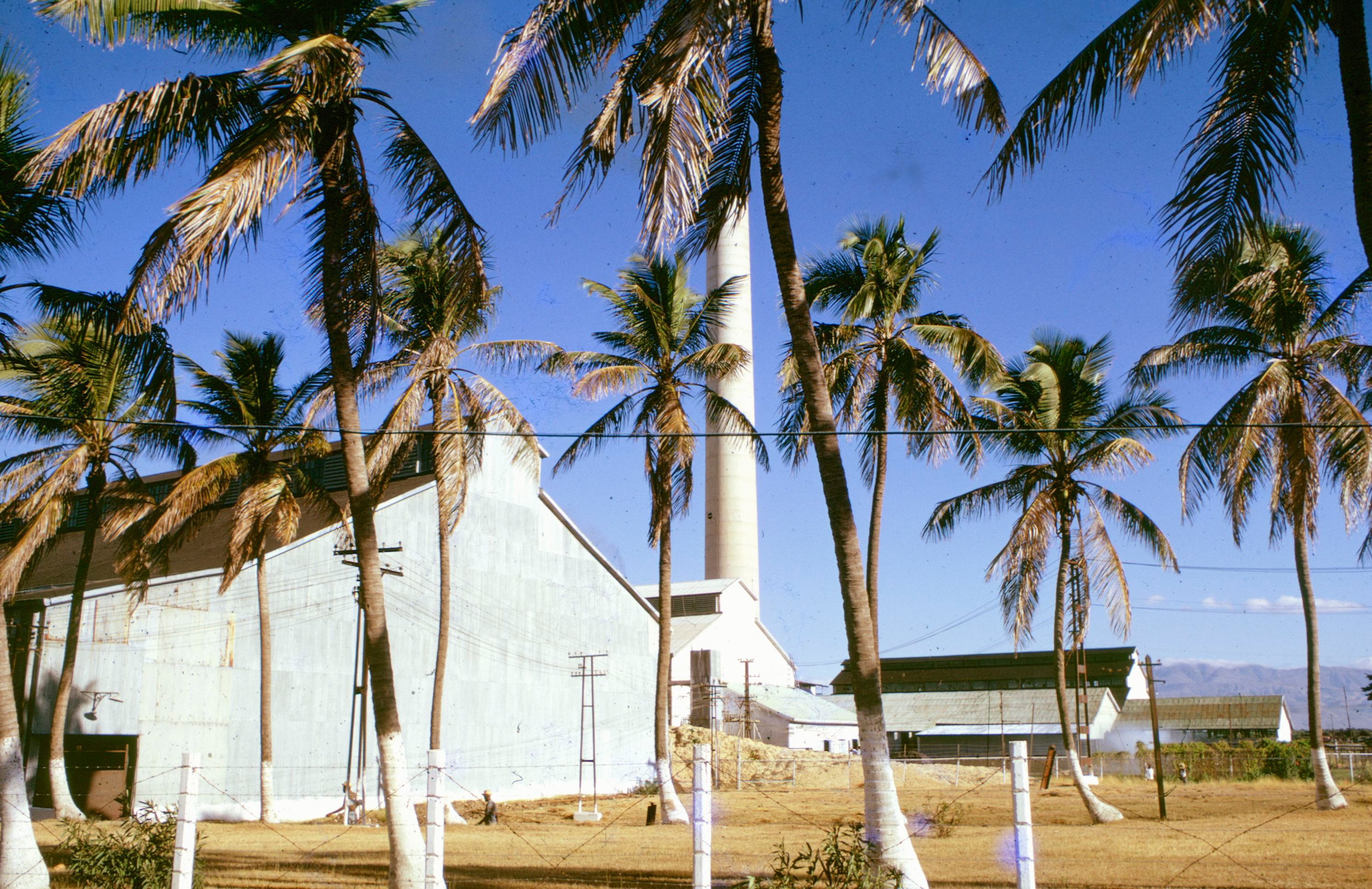
Port-au-Prince HASCO sugar refinery in the Cul-de-Sac Plain (1974)

Plain of the Cul-de-Sac (French: Plaine du Cul-de-Sac, also known as the Cul-de-Sac Plain, or the Cul-de-Sac Depression) is a fertile lowland on the island of Hispaniola. It extends from southeastern Haiti into the southwestern Dominican Republic, where it is known as the Hoya de Enriquillo.

== Geography ==
Covering an area of 20000 km^{2} around with a length of 130 km long, the Plain of the Cul-de-Sac is bounded to the north and south by high mountains and to the west by the Gulf of Gonâve on the edges of which is the Haitian capital of Port-au-Prince and to the Plaine de l'Arcahaie that extends to the west. The Plain of the Cul-de-Sac extends eastward into the Dominican Republic.

This valley was once an arm of the sea and upon withdrawal of the latter during the uprising Oligocene Miocene, salt water was trapped in the lowest points of depression resulting in two grand lakes; Etang Saumâtre (also called "Lake Azuéi") on the Haiti-Dominican Republic border, a small saltwater lake called Trou Caïman in Haiti, and Lake Enriquillo in the Dominican Republic.

The plain has always been a farming region. In the colonial era, indigo was cultivated there. Over the decades, this production lost its momentum, giving way to fields of sugar cane. The Rivière Blanche (Ouest), through its irrigation system and channeling of part of its journey to the Canal Boucanbrou, trickles down this vast plain. In its southern part, the Plain of Cul-de-Sac is crossed by the Rivière Grise.
