= La Descubierta =

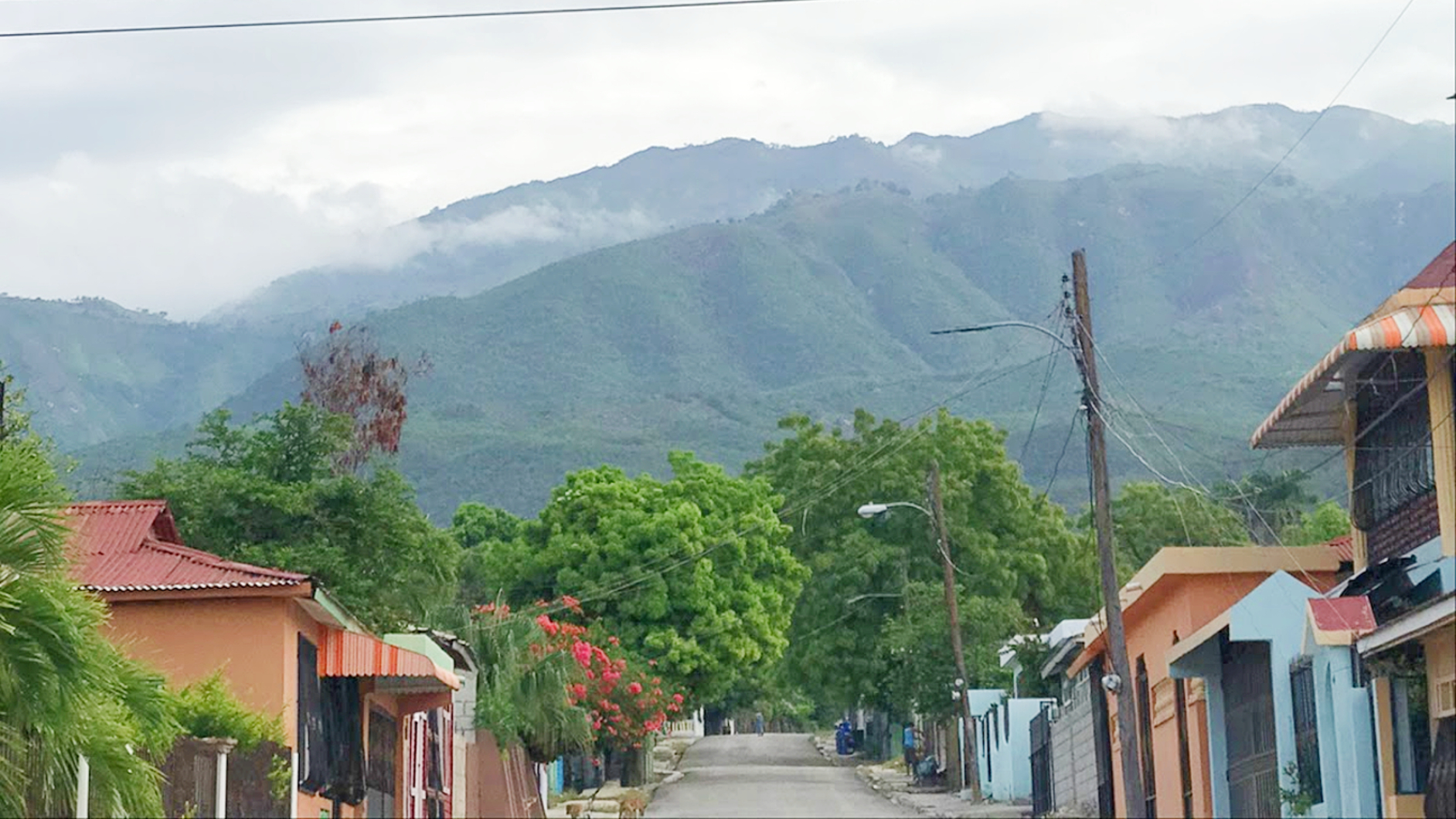
- Town of La Descubierta

- Location within the Dominican Republic
- Coordinates: 18°34′12″N 71°43′48″W
- Country: Dominican Republic
- Province: Independencia

Area
  - Total: 206.85 km^{2} (79.87 sq mi)

Population (2012)
  - Total: 6,990
  - Density: 33.8/km^{2} (87.5/sq mi)
- Climate: Aw

La Descubierta is a town in the Independencia province of the Dominican Republic.

== Climate ==
Climate data for La Descubierta (1961–1990)
Month	Jan	Feb	Mar	Apr	May	Jun	Jul	Aug	Sep	Oct	Nov	Dec	Year
Record high °C (°F)	36.0 (96.8)	37.0 (98.6)	37.5 (99.5)	39.4 (102.9)	39.0 (102.2)	38.0 (100.4)	39.0 (102.2)	40.5 (104.9)	39.0 (102.2)	38.5 (101.3)	38.0 (100.4)	35.5 (95.9)	40.5 (104.9)
Mean daily maximum °C (°F)	31.8 (89.2)	32.4 (90.3)	33.2 (91.8)	33.8 (92.8)	33.8 (92.8)	34.0 (93.2)	34.7 (94.5)	34.8 (94.6)	34.7 (94.5)	33.9 (93.0)	33.0 (91.4)	32.1 (89.8)	33.5 (92.3)
Mean daily minimum °C (°F)	21.0 (69.8)	21.5 (70.7)	22.2 (72.0)	22.8 (73.0)	23.5 (74.3)	24.0 (75.2)	24.2 (75.6)	24.0 (75.2)	23.7 (74.7)	23.3 (73.9)	22.5 (72.5)	21.3 (70.3)	22.8 (73.0)
Record low °C (°F)	15.5 (59.9)	14.5 (58.1)	17.5 (63.5)	19.0 (66.2)	20.0 (68.0)	20.0 (68.0)	20.5 (68.9)	17.0 (62.6)	20.0 (68.0)	17.0 (62.6)	12.0 (53.6)	14.0 (57.2)	12.0 (53.6)
Average rainfall mm (inches)	16.0 (0.63)	14.6 (0.57)	32.6 (1.28)	65.5 (2.58)	112.2 (4.42)	36.2 (1.43)	37.1 (1.46)	69.7 (2.74)	80.5 (3.17)	113.7 (4.48)	52.0 (2.05)	19.1 (0.75)	649.2 (25.56)
Average rainy days (≥ 1.0 mm)	1.9	2.4	3.4	7.0	9.0	4.9	4.4	6.1	7.1	8.4	4.7	2.3	61.6
Source: NOAA

== Sources ==
- – World-Gazetteer.com
