= Étang Saumâtre =

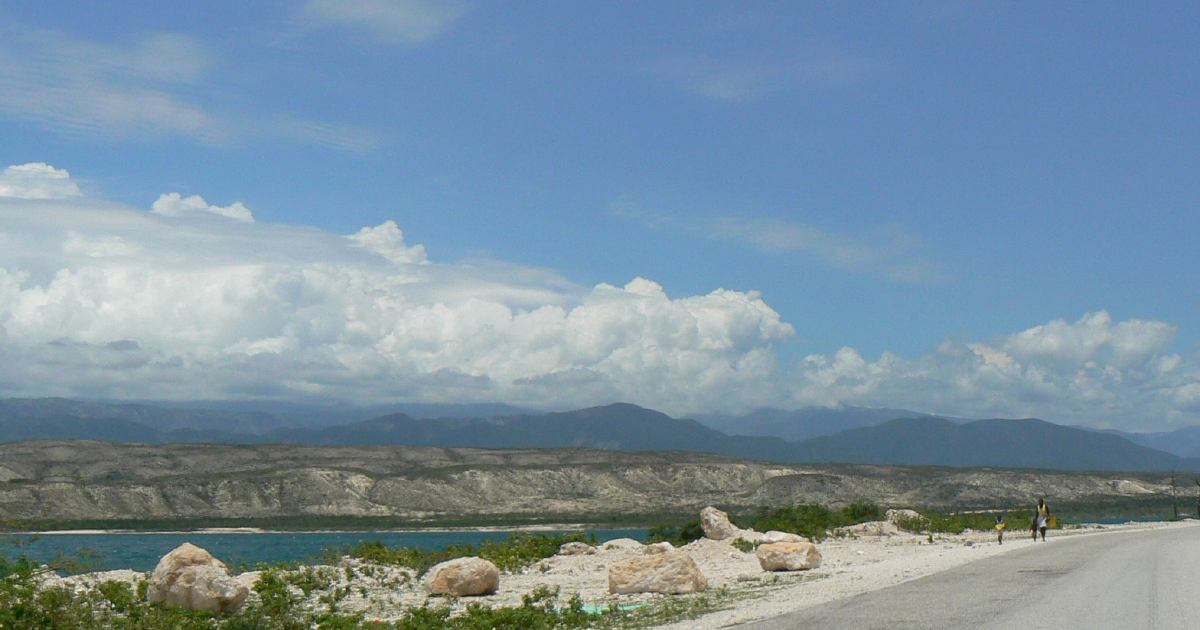
- Étang Saumâtre; Lac Azuéi

- Location within Haiti

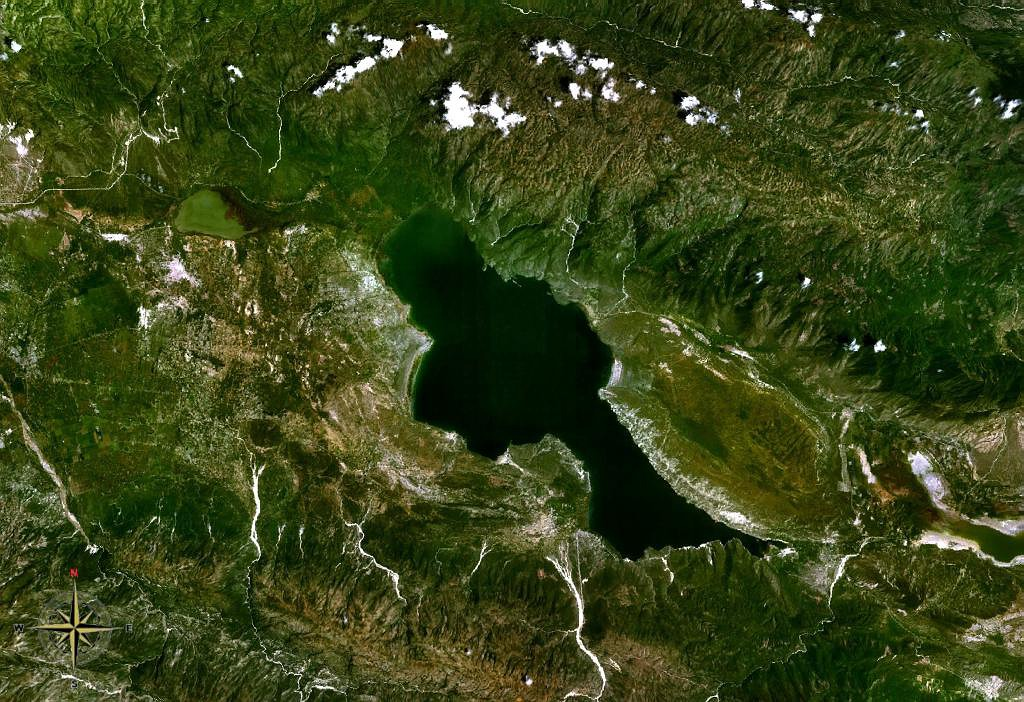
- View from space
- Location: Plaine du Cul-de-Sac
- Coordinates: 18°35′51″N 72°00′53″W
- Lake type: Salt lake
- Primary inflows: Small streams
- Primary outflows: Land locked
- Basin countries: Haiti, Dominican Republic
- Max. length: 22 km (14 mi)
- Max. width: 12 km (7.5 mi)
- Surface area: 170 km^{2} (66 sq mi)
- Surface elevation: 15 m (49 ft)
- Settlements: Jimaní

Étang Saumâtre (Spanish: Laguna del Fondo), (English: brackish pond) is the largest lake in Haiti, and lies along part of the border with the Dominican Republic. It is also known as Lake Azuéi (Lac Azuéi); its Taíno name was Yainagua.

Unlike its hypersaline neighbor, Étang Saumâtre is a brackish water lake. It lies 22 kilometres (14 mi) east of Port-au-Prince on the fertile Plaine du Cul-de-Sac. The lake supports over 100 species of waterfowl, American flamingos (Phoenicopterus ruber), American crocodiles (Crocodylus acutus), and several other fauna found nowhere else in Haiti. The color of the lake is an intense shade of blue, and it is skirted by brush and cacti.

== Geography ==
Étang Saumâtre is located on the arid part of the valley Cul-de-Sac, 29 kilometres (18 mi) east of Port-au-Prince in the Ouest department. Its eastern side is part of the border between Haiti and the Dominican Republic; the Dominican city of Jimaní is less than 1 km from the southeast end of the lake.

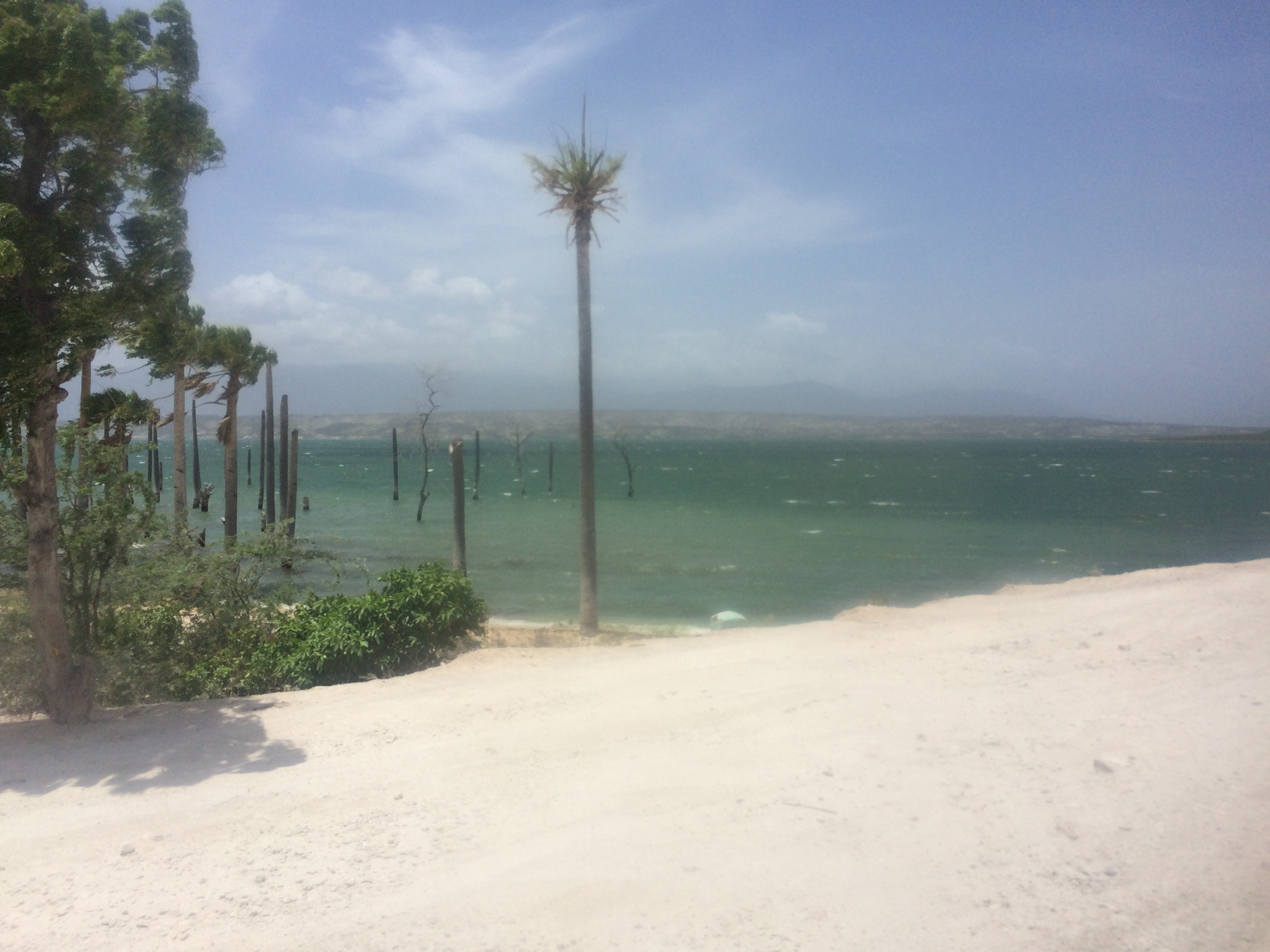
Beach view of Étang Saumâtre

The lake itself is part of a chain of nearby saline lakes that lie within the rift valley known as the Cul-de-Sac Depression in Haiti and the Hoya de Enriquillo in the Dominican Republic. Because the region was a former marine strait, several areas of the valley are below sea level. It is a tectonic lake formed by movement in the Enriquillo–Plantain Garden fault zone, with a depression of16 kilometres (9.9 mi) long and 4 kilometres (2.5 mi) wide.

Étang Saumâtre is landlocked, as it has no surface outlet. It is fed by springs emanating from calcareous rocks. The western part of the lake has slightly saline water, while the eastern part has fresh water.

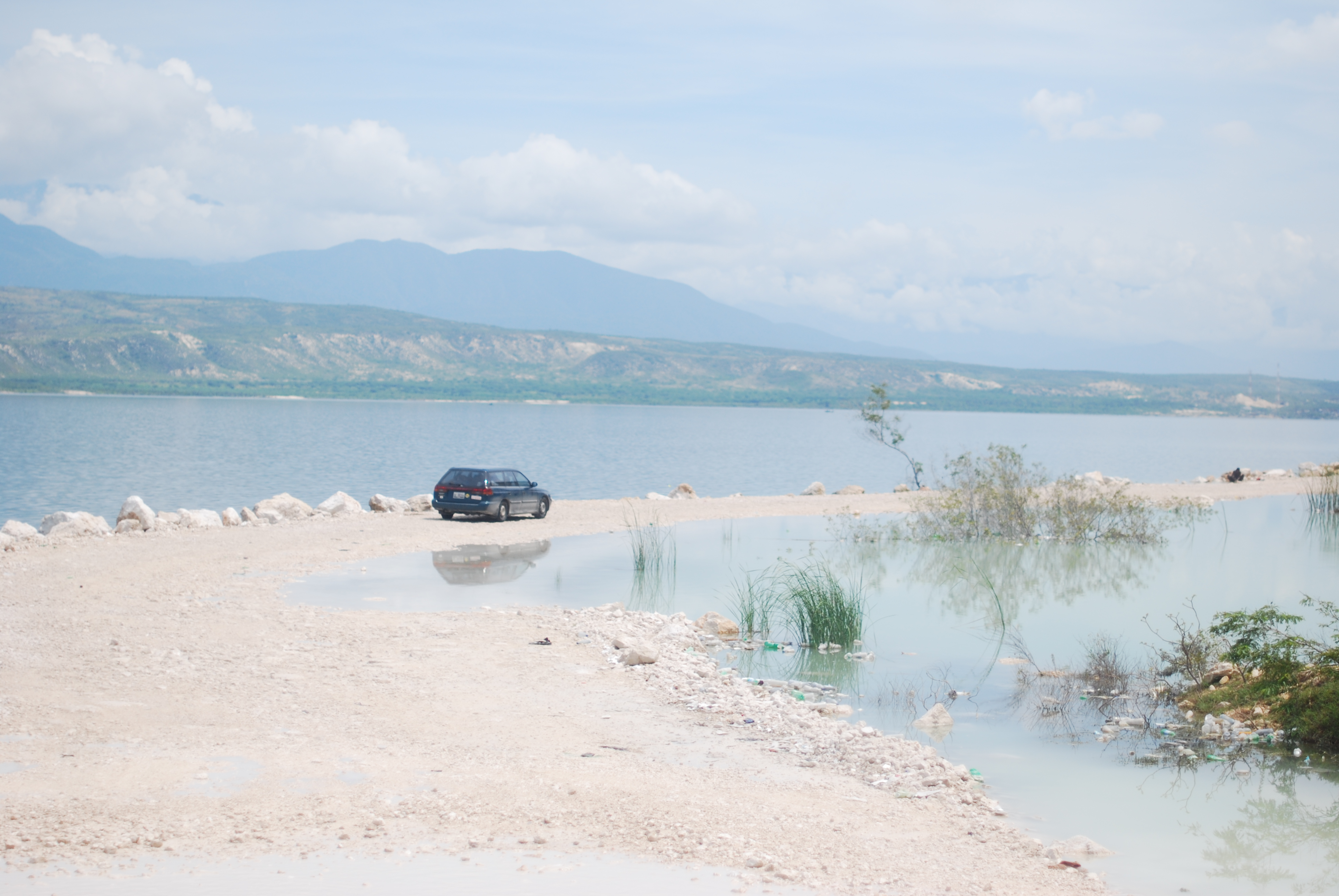
Hispaniola border road

The lake has a length, from northwest to southeast, of 22 kilometres (14 mi); its maximum width is 12 kilometres (7.5 mi). The total area is 170 km^{2} (66 mi^{2}). The lake water has an elevation of 15 metres (49 ft) with maximum water depth being 30 metres (98 ft). A sandy shore, shallow lagoons and mudflats form the eastern shore line, while the western shores have small fresh water springs and marshes. The eastern shore is state-owned, but parts of the western side of the lake are privately owned. Salinity of the lake water is now reported as 15‰ (parts per thousand). Lake water fluctuations are minimal, at about 50 centimetres (20 in), except during the drought period, when the water level could go down by 2 metres (6.6 ft). Conversely, the water level rises about 2 metres (6.6 ft) above the average during heavy rainfall years. The present assessment is that the level of the lake has been rising in recent years, forcing Haitians who live in plantation residential areas ("bateyes") around the edge of the lake to seek higher ground.

The two largest lakes of the region, Azuéi and Enriquillo, have the same tectonic origin and are considered "twins," but have many dissimilarities. Azuéi has a stable shore line, its waters are azure blue in colour, salinity level is low (11‰) and its surface area is relatively stable. Meanwhile, Enriquillo's water looks white-greyish in colour, its salinity levels are very high (they have risen from 36‰ to 110‰) and current water surface area (160 km^{2} (62 mi^{2}) compares to 280 km^{2} (110 mi^{2}) in 1968. The climatic conditions for both lakes are similar (low rainfall in the range of 500–1,000 millimetres (20–39 in)), within similar geological setting.

Azuéi's salinity is about one fifth (1/5) the salinity of sea water. A few small rivers flow into the lake.

== Fauna and flora ==
The lake and its surrounding land are habitat for flora and fauna of several endemic species, including invertebrates, fishes and reptiles. This endemism is also common to the twin lakes, due to proximity and common history.

=== Fauna ===
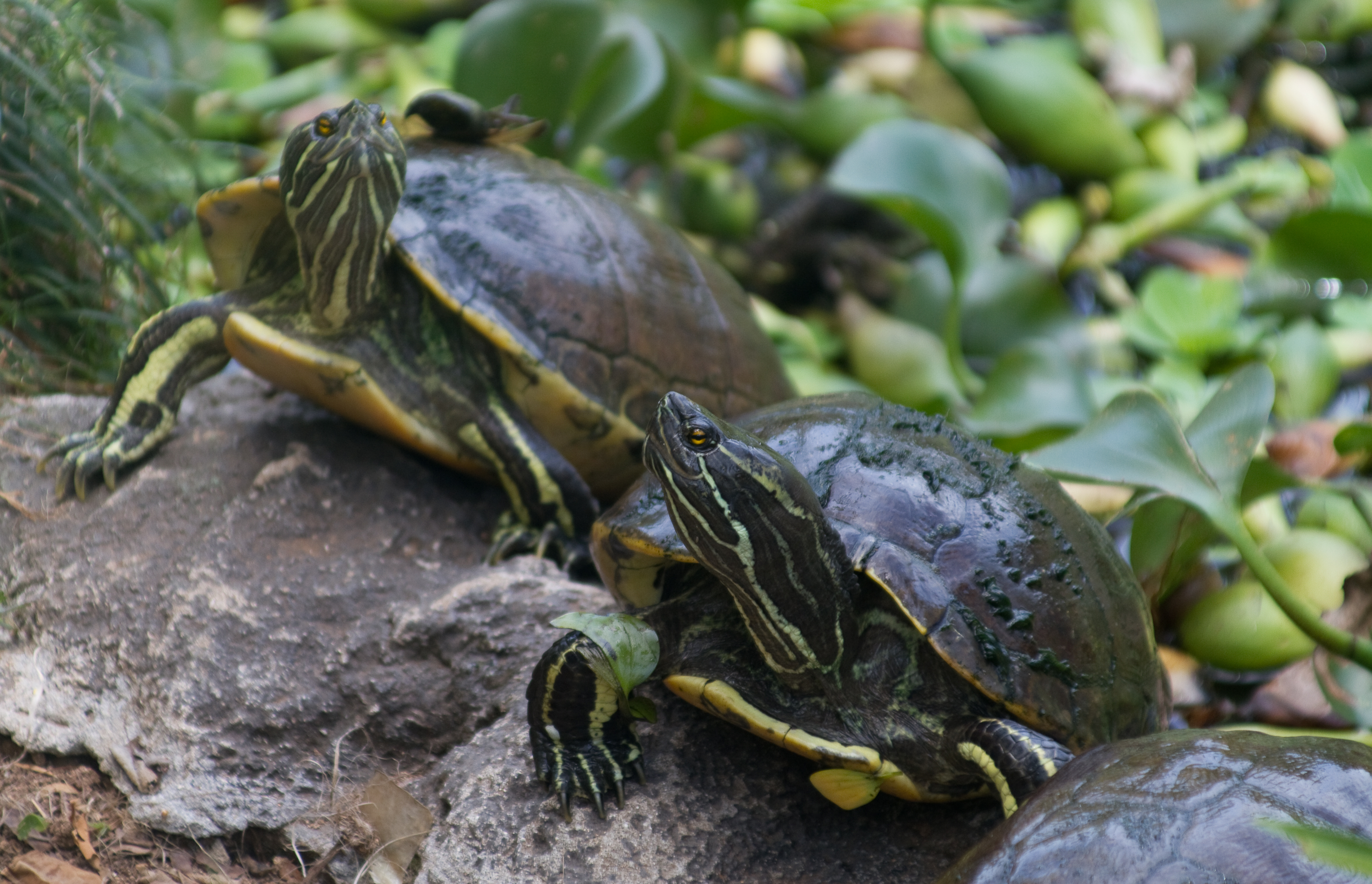
Hispaniolan slider

The lake supports over 100 species of waterfowl (including flamingos), as well as American crocodiles; freshwater species of turtle, including the Hispaniolan slider (Trachemys decorata) and other reptiles, such as the rhinoceros iguana (Cyclura cornuta). Some fishes, such as tilapia, are also found. Its recognized importance is as a breeding, passage and wintering area for numerous bird species: as many as 300–400 breeding pairs of wading birds in the Ciconiiformes can be found in the eastern zone of the lagoon. Important avian raptor species of the lake include the osprey (Pandion haliaetus).

==== American crocodiles ====
American crocodiles are found in the lake, and have instilled fear among the local community. It is one factor responsible for the poor development of the lake as an ecotourism project. Extensive studies have been reported on this species of crocodile, as opposed to the Central American Crocodylus moreletii and the South American Crocodylus intermedius.

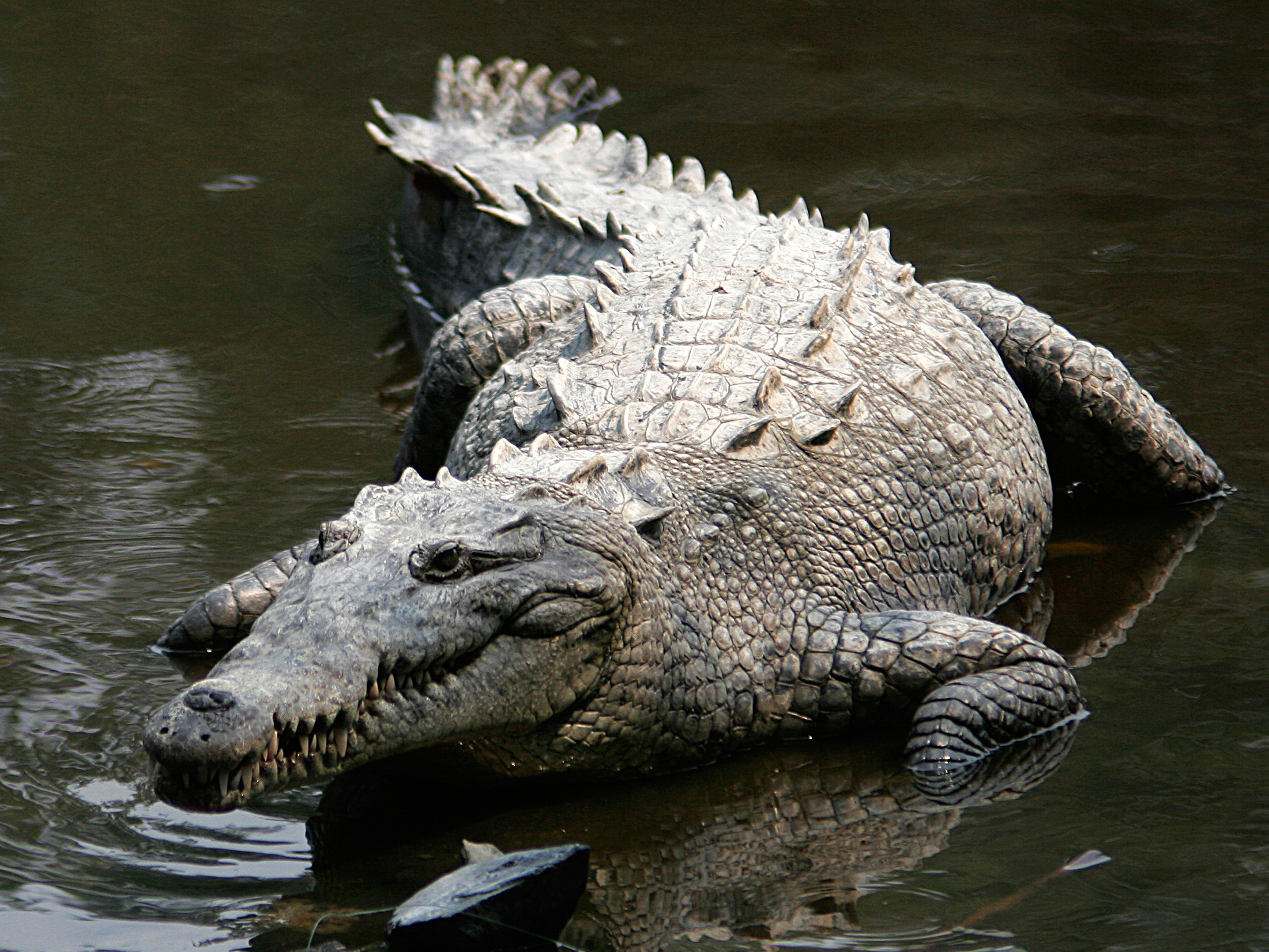
American crocodile

C. acutus is widely distributed in the coastal regions of the Neotropics; however, it is assumed to be surviving on the island of Hispaniola only in the saltwater lakes of Étang Saumâtre and Enriquillo. In 1984, there were estimated to be more than 400 individuals in and around Étang Saumâtre. It is also reported that this population is nearing extirpation, due to excessive hunting and poaching.

American crocodiles generally achieve a length of 4 metres (13 ft), though 6.25 metres (20.5 ft) long or 7 metres (23 ft) long specimens have been reported in Étang Saumâtre. The lake is known for the high concentration of crocodiles at 9.6/km in certain zones, with average density of 6.3/km for all crocodile size classes. The density varies in its habitat zones, over a distance of 1 kilometre (0.62 mi) and 1.5 kilometres (0.93 mi) length from the shore line. In the rocky shores, the density was reported to be 0.2/km. However, from 1 kilometre (0.62 mi) from the shore line called the conocarpus fringe, the density was recorded as 14.5/km. They grow in size up to the age of 2 years when their size is in the range of 0.9–1.8 metres (3.0–5.9 ft). They are found in shallow water zones also and feed on cichlids (Nandopsis haitiensis). They remain mostly at the bottom of the lake and during bird nesting season they are found around a heron rookery to catch falling eggs of birds. Their foraging techniques vary from an active to a passive mode, and they forage on non-aquatic invertebrates and also odonate larvae. Birds and fish (Cichilidae) are the common items of their diet. Adults also eat domestic animals such as dogs and goats, and turtles. They nest in a 6.6 kilometres (4.1 mi) stretch within a range of 7–47 metres (23–154 ft) from the shoreline, of the uninhabited eastern lake shore, near charcoal-making sites and in coralliferous limestone outcrops.

==== Aquatic fauna ====
Aquatic fauna of the lake consists of small Poeciliidae (such as Gambusia dominicensis, Limia melanonotata and Limia nigrofasciata) and cichlids (Nandopsis haitiensis). In the past, 17,000 mirror carp fingerlings and 50,000 Tilapia mossambica fingerlings (a figure of 6,000 is also mentioned) were reportedly introduced to the lake. Fish productivity figures of the lake are not available. However, the actual catches are reported to be small, as fishing is done only on a small scale. Boats do not ply the lagoon; fishing methods are primitive and no nets are used. Ducks are hunted for food as well.

=== Flora ===
The lake is in the region of dry subtropical forest and hence the vegetation around the lake is sparse, with cacti and scrub-type shrubs. Typical vegetation consists of dry-forest plants endemic to the island of Hispaniola. They include trees, shrubs and cacti: caguey (Leptocereus paniculatus), melon espinoso (Melocactus lemairei), palo blanco (Croton poitaei), pitahaya (Harrisia nashii) and oreganillo (Lantana cifferiana).

The lagoon itself has several species of algae. In the fringes of the lake, Conocarpus erectus are reported and Typha domingensis are seen in the marshy region and fresh water streams and canals that have inlet into the lake. The lake has halophytic algae laid out as mattresses growing on its lake bed. Buttonwood mangroves trees have large growth in the periphery of the lake. These are felled extensively to make charcoal.

== Threats to the lake ==
Deforestation and soil erosion have occurred and are occurring in the catchment of Lake Azuéi. Its water level has remained relatively stable. Increased levels of eutrophication in the form of increased growth of algae have been noted due to urban growth which is chiefly in Fonds Parisien. During heavy afternoon winds deposit periodically dropped or dumped plastics from the shore. Publicly taxed waste disposal and management rarely operate around the lake, an area which also has little law enforcement of minor littering.

== Conservation measures ==
Haiti and the Dominican Republic and many international agencies are aware of the status of the two water bodies and the catchments drained by them. While Lago Enriquillo in the Dominican Republic has become the first Dominican Ramsar Site and is also a national park since 1996, its twin lake, Etang Saumâtre has only been studied and is yet to receive the constructive attention for conservation of its American crocodiles and to promote ecotourism in general. However, a transboundary environmental program covering the watershed of the two lakes has been identified by the two governments to jointly initiate measures to improve the condition of the lakes and their respective catchments. This team, with professionals drawn from both countries, and with financial support from the European Union, could ensure that steps are taken to “create wise use practices for both lakes and their corresponding watersheds”.

== Sources ==
- "Saumâtre, Étang." The Columbia Gazetteer of North America. Columbia University Press: 2000.
