= Thony Belizaire =

Haitian photographer and photojournalist

Thony Belizaire (March 30, 1955 – July 21, 2013) was a Haitian photographer and photojournalist, who reported for Agence France Presse (AFP) in Haiti for more than twenty-five years, from May 1987 until his death in July 2013. Belizaire covered some of the most important stories in Haiti over the past three decades, including the 2010 Haiti earthquake. He earned numerous awards for journalism and photography.

Belizaire was born on March 30, 1955. A photographer, Belizaire joined the staff of AFP in May 1987 as a photojournalist. In 2013, Belizaire began work on photo essays that explored environment of Haiti, as well as photographs of potential development needed to improve the quality of life for the average Haitian.

In addition to his work with AFP, Belizaire founded the Union of Haitian Journalists and Photographers (UJPH). He was also a contributor to Radio Kiskeya.

Belizaire, who had fought oral cancer, died from complications of respiratory difficulties at the Canapé Vert hospital in Pétion-Ville, a suburb of Port-au-Prince, on July 21, 2013, at the age of 54. He had still been reporting as recently as July 19, when he covered a local protest against the legalization of same-sex marriage. He was survived by his wife, Marie-Florence, and three children – Jeremie, Jonathan and Jovanny.

Prime Minister of Haiti Laurent Lamothe called Belizaire an "outstanding professional" noting that "Mr. Belizaire devoted more than 30 years of his life to covering the major social, political and cultural events in the life of the Haitian people." The regional director of AFP for North America, David Millikin, also paid tribute to his life, "Thony was a gentle but very courageous man – not only for ignoring personal risk while covering the momentous events which marked Haiti's recent history, but also for pursuing his career with passion and diligence despite battling serious health issues in recent years."
