= Environmental issues in Haiti =

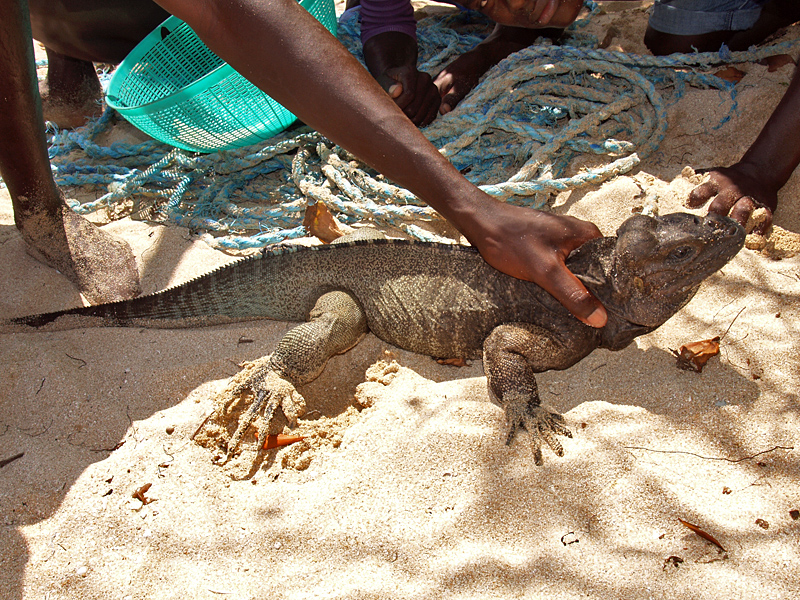
People capture a rhinoceros iguana on Limbe Island, Northern Haiti.

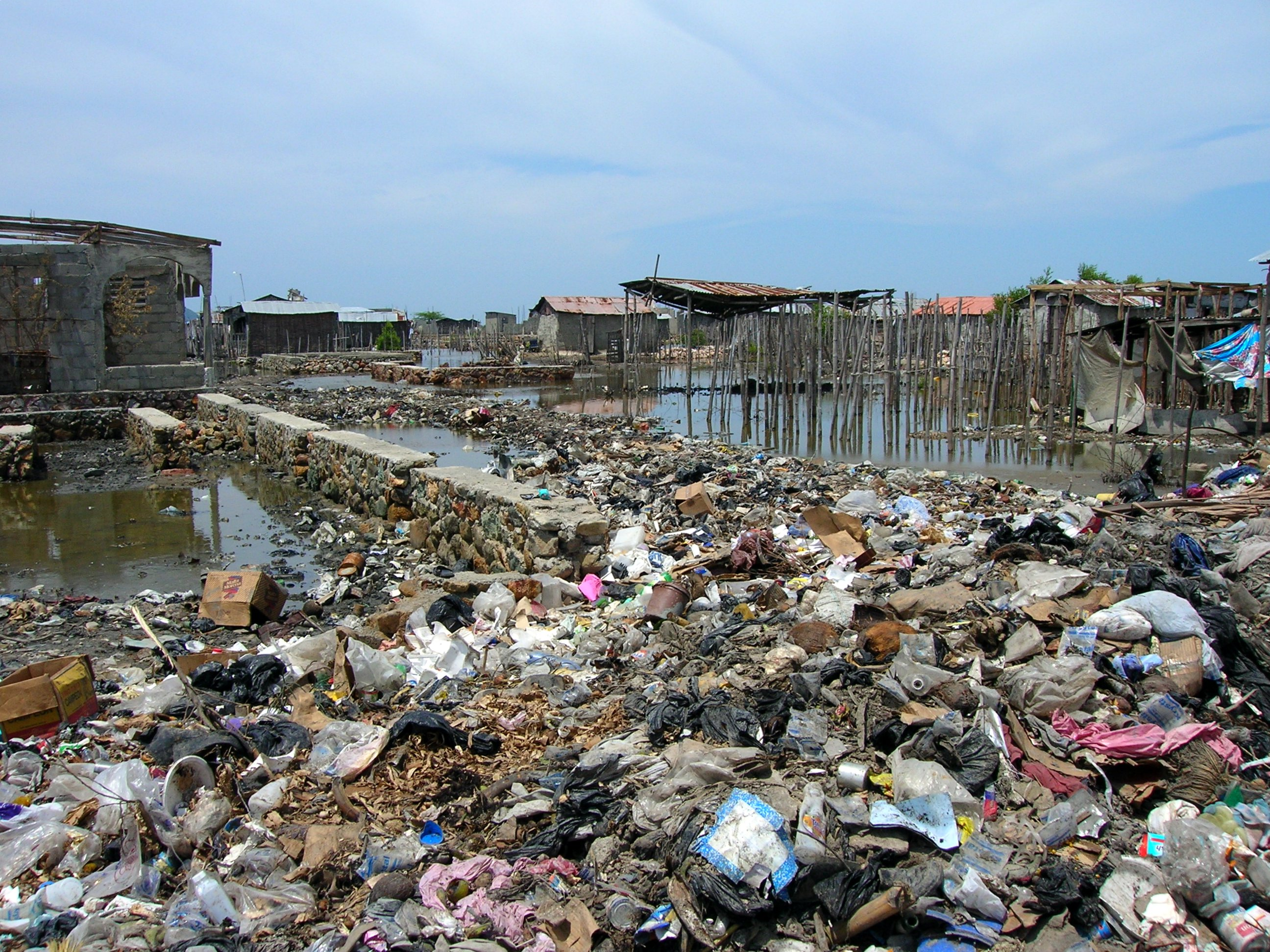
Household rubbish used to build a causeway in Cap-Haïtien.

Environmental issues in Haiti include a historical deforestation problem, overpopulation, a lack of sanitation, natural disasters, and food insecurity. The major reasons for these environmental issues are corruption, human exploitation, and the embezzlement of taxpayers' funds for personal gains. In addition, there is not sufficient protection or management of the country's natural resources. Other environmental issues, such as decreases in precipitation and more severe natural disasters, will likely arise in Haiti as a result of climate change. Experts agree that Haiti needs to adopt new policies to address both the issues that already exist and to prepare for the effects of climate change.

== Issues ==
=== Deforestation ===
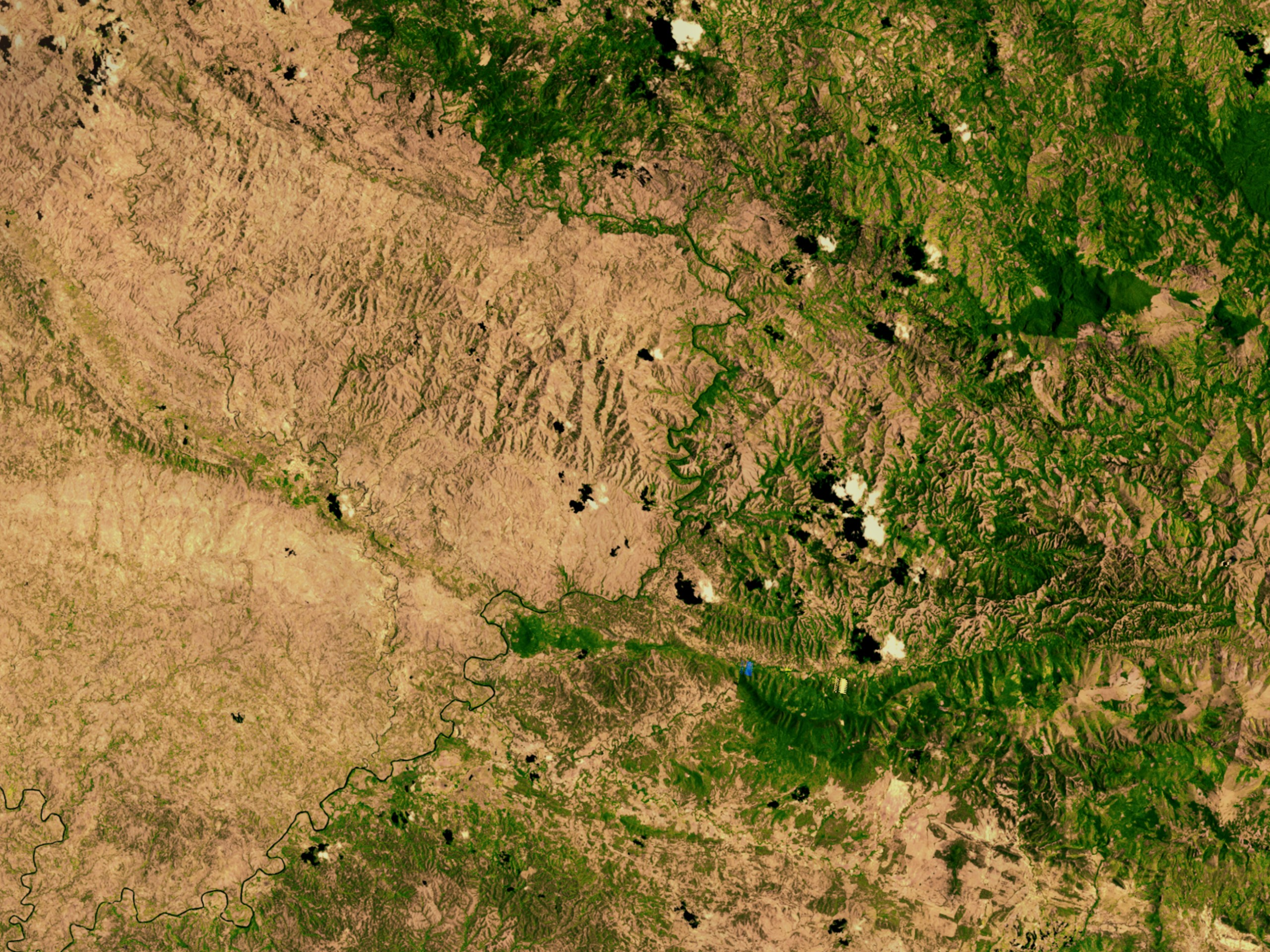
A satellite image of the border between the denuded landscape of Haiti (left) and the Dominican Republic (right).

Deforestation in Haiti occurred primarily during the colonial period, and later after the Haitian Revolution to pay a post-independence war indemnity to France. Deforestation has led to soil erosion by decreasing tree cover and leaving soil exposed. In the present era, arboreal fallow, or trees cleared for agricultural production, are then transformed into charcoal as a secondary agricultural by-product.

Today, 'primary' forest cover in Haiti is estimated at less than 1% of all land area. In an earlier study using the Food and Agricultural Organization (United Nations) global standard definition for 'forest', which includes areas that have been degraded by as much as 90% (10% canopy), approximately 30% of Haiti was estimated to be covered with trees and/or forests. However, because the United Nations definition does not distinguish between areas that have been previously deforested and those never deforested (primary forest), and the use of different canopy cover values can yield different per cent forest cover values, and because primary forest is the most important forest for the preservation of biodiversity, it is argued that only the value of <1% primary forest is relevant for environmental issues in Haiti because it addresses both deforestation and biodiversity.

Haiti had a 2018 Forest Landscape Integrity Index mean score of 4.01/10, ranking it 137th globally out of 172 countries.

==== Charcoal ====
Charcoal production and consumption in Haiti is a widely misunderstood phenomenon. Charcoal is the primary source of energy for Haitian residents. The UN reported that 92% of Haitian households rely on charcoal for cooking, and approximately 10,000 bags of charcoal are burned daily in Haiti.

Media has popularly portrayed Haitians as engaged in a widespread and lucrative illegal market for charcoal in the neighbouring Dominican Republic. Conservative estimates calculate the illegal movement of 115 tons of charcoal per week from the Dominican Republic to Haiti in 2014. Dominican officials estimate that at least 10 trucks per week are crossing the border loaded with charcoal. However new research and charcoal export data from the Dominican Republic indicate the flow of charcoal into Haiti has declined as Dominicans have found more lucrative charcoal markets in the United States and the Middle East.

==== Agriculture ====
It was once believed that Haiti's reliance on agriculture to support its economy is another primary reason for deforestation. 66.4% of the land in Haiti is used for agricultural purposes. Reallocating land for forest means a reduction in land available for cultivation of crops, and currently the land available is insufficient to keep pace with the growing population of Haiti. Additionally, insecure property rights discourage forest management; the possibility that tenants will reap the benefits of land conservation is reduced because it is possible that they may lose that property in the future. The Haitian government could encourage citizens to preserve forested land through the strengthening of property rights, as this would create greater responsibility of land use. Currently, there is a lack of off-farm opportunities; many rural residents depend on agriculture for their livelihood. An increase in off-farm employment could minimize deforestation, as this would potentially reduce the need for households to clear forest for crop.

=== Overpopulation ===
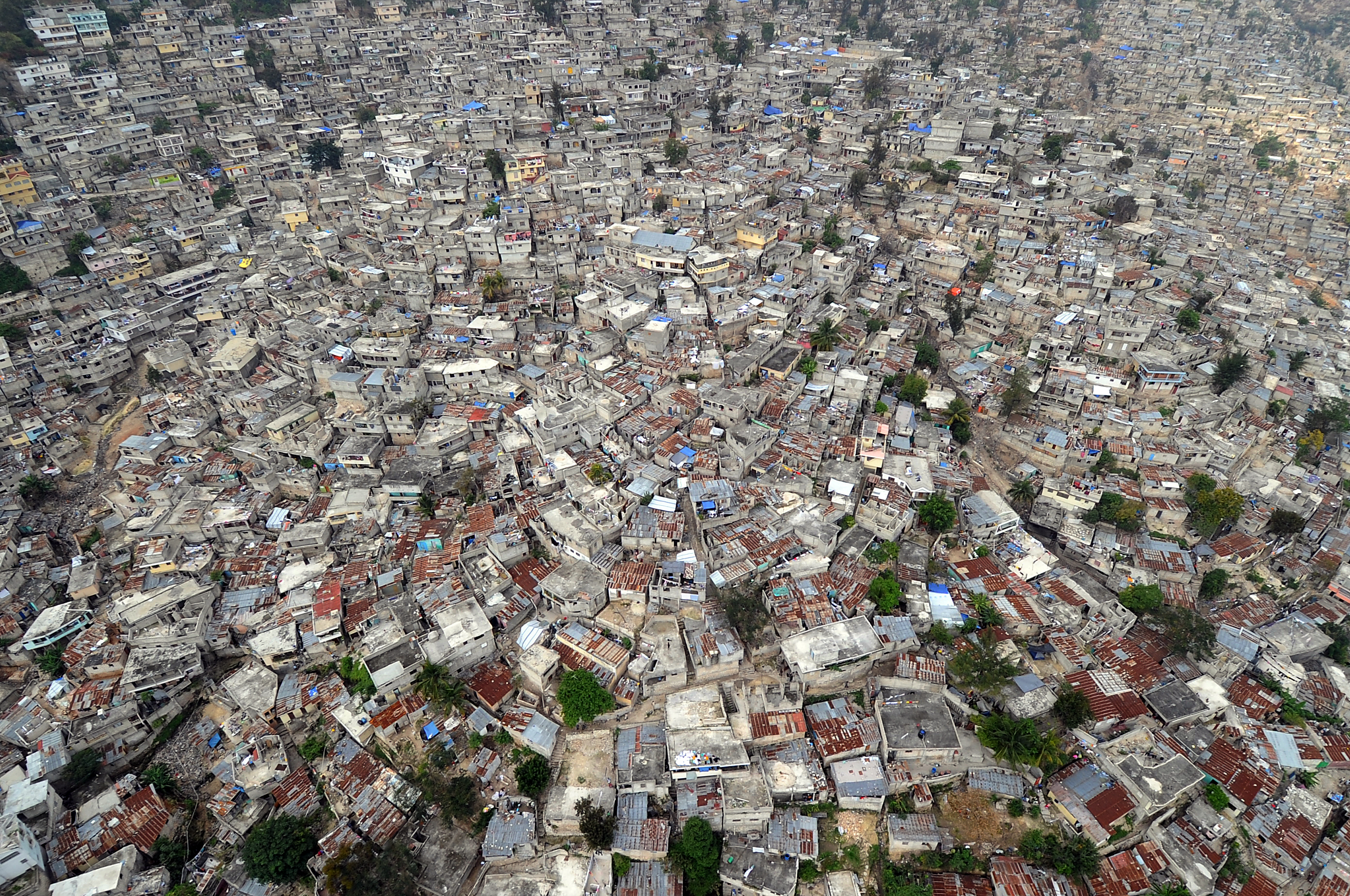
A dense slum in the capital Port-au-Prince.

Early researchers claimed that an increasing Haitian population contributed to the degradation of the environment. However, recent research places Haiti as the country with the lowest per capita ecological footprint in the world.

Haiti can be characterized as a low-income, high-density nation. As of 2012, Haiti's population count was at 10.6 million. The UN estimates that 52% of the population lived in urban areas in 2011, with an annual 3.9% annual increase in population in urban areas. Low-income individuals are largely concentrated in urban areas, especially Port-au-Prince, and are subject to poor environmental quality, human health, and quality of life. Port-au-Prince's urban environmental quality is further reduced by its poor infrastructure, lack of government management, and its subjectivity to natural disasters, as a result of being located on the coast. As the population of urban areas in Haiti grows it is hard to update the already poor infrastructure to meet the needs of so many people. When an abundance of people don't have an adequate waste management system, it can have devastating effects on the environment through air and water pollution. Studies show that more than 60% of Haitians live in low environmental quality urban areas near the coast, such as Port-au-Prince. Environmental quality can be measured by assessing the domestic environment, public environment, physical environment and atmosphere. The areas with the lowest environmental quality have the highest population density and are subject to pollution and an array of natural hazards, which can destroy natural resources and cause environmental degradation. These individuals face a situation of environmental injustice. In rural areas, overpopulation causes over-cultivation of land and therefore soil erosion, as nutrients are quickly depleted from the soil. Although many Haitian farmers are aware of the effects of their practices on the soil, they are often reluctant to change their practices because political and economic factors, such as insecure property rights and high prices of capital, prohibit them from adopting proper technologies.

=== Lack of sanitation ===
The lack of sanitation and sewerage treatment in Haiti has led to an inadequate supply of safe drinking water. City sewerage systems are insufficient, and many citizens have to use septic tanks. Local drainage systems primarily consist of open channels dug along the side of the road. The densely populated capital of Port-au-Prince is especially at risk for water-borne diseases, with many of its citizens residing on flood plains in poorly constructed housing and a generally under-developed waste management system. Only 46% of the urban population has access to safe water, and in 2012 only 55% of people in urban areas had "improved sanitation", which consisted of using a latrine. Natural disasters make water sanitation even worse, as latrines and channels on the side of the road often overflow with large amounts of rain. A 2012 study after hurricane season found that less than 10% of households were drinking treated water a week after a storm.

==== Cholera ====
Cholera has become one of the leading issues facing Haiti, and its recurrence is largely due to Haiti's poor sanitation system. A Cholera epidemic was reported in Haiti in October 2010 after the infection was brought to the country by peacekeeping troops providing aid after a devastating earthquake struck the region. Infections have continued to occur since the initial epidemic, which raises questions as to whether there is an established environmental reservoir of Cholera in Haiti. Environmental reservoirs are environmental sources where the bacterium can survive between outbreaks of the disease. There is evidence that conditions are appropriate for Cholera to establish environmental reservoirs in the water of Haiti. The establishment of environmental reservoirs would make it nearly impossible to eradicate the disease from Haiti, and increase the chance of transmission of the disease neighbouring countries. Both improving sanitation and monitoring potential environmental reservoirs are necessary to reduce the spread of Cholera throughout Haiti.

=== Effects of climate change ===
Haiti's position as a southern island nation makes it particularly susceptible to the effects of climate change. Factors that make Haiti more vulnerable than other Caribbean nations, such as the Dominican Republic, are its higher population density, extensive deforestation, extreme soil erosion, and high income-inequality. Several effects of increased intensity of tropical storms, depleted coral reefs, and desertification. Since 1960 the mean annual rainfall has decreased by 5mm per month per decade, and mean temperatures have increased by 0.45 °C. The combination of increased temperatures and decreased rainfall will likely lead to the intensification of drought conditions, especially in the centre of the country. According to the IPCC climate change predictions for 2050, more than 50% of Haiti will be in danger of desertification. The frequency of hot days and nights has increased, while the frequency of cold days and nights have steadily decreased. Sea-level rise is projected to rise between 0.13 and 0.56 m by 2090. The US Climate Change Science program estimates that with each 1 °C increase in temperature, hurricane rainfall will increase by 6–17% and hurricane wind speeds will increase by 1–8%.

==== Natural disasters ====
As a small Caribbean country, Haiti is often the victim of intense natural disasters such as hurricanes, tropical storms, and earthquakes, which have a large impact on both Haiti's environment and its citizens. The intensity of Atlantic hurricanes in Haiti has increased substantially since 1980. These storms frequently result in loss of human life, loss of livestock, destruction of agriculture, soil erosion, a spike in water-borne diseases, and decreased food security. Tropical storms often also lead to flooding, which is one of the leading causes of vulnerability in Haiti. Flooding often occurs in Haiti's most populous cities, which are located in valleys along the coast. Large amounts of rain, barren hills resulting from deforestation, and poor drainage infrastructure leave Haiti especially susceptible to flooding after tropical storms. Landslides also often result from the rain accompanying a tropical storm since much of the soil has eroded as a result of deforestation. From 1980 to 2009, Haiti had more deaths due to natural disasters than any other country in the insular Caribbean. The majority of deaths were caused by flooding or landslides, which resulted from the heavy rains of tropical storms combined with the unstable slopes left from deforestation. Poor infrastructure makes it difficult for people to cope with natural disasters on a basic level. A significant reason why other Caribbean countries experience lower death rates than Haiti is that their investment in physical infrastructure and human resources have led to risk reduction and successful disaster management. In Haiti, inability to evacuate leads to a much larger loss of life than a country with good public infrastructure and paved roads would experience in the same situation. Unfortunately, Haiti lacks both climate-resilient infrastructure and the funds to construct it.

==== Food insecurity ====
Roughly 40% of the total land in Haiti is farmed, with agriculture being the basis of the country's economy. Given agriculture's high dependence on natural ecosystem services, farming systems are at high risk to be negatively affected by climate change and climate-induced shocks. Food security is poor in the immediate aftermath of natural disasters, and more erratic and unpredictable rainfall will place strain on the agriculture industry in the future. Following the hurricanes of 2012, about 70% of Haitian residents reported suffering from moderate or severe hunger, and more than two-thirds of farmers reported having crops destroyed, losing materials to plant new crops, or losing farming equipment. A warning system to aid farmers in preparing for these natural disasters would be an efficient way to reduce the impact of storms on the agricultural system. The farming sector will also have to build resilience against drought and water scarcity as rainfall patterns change. Drought particularly affects the Northwest, Artibonite, and Centre departments of Haiti. Erratic rainfall patterns and poor water management infrastructure cause droughts, which destroy crops, reduce agricultural production, and decrease food security. Improved infrastructure could play a role in increasing food security, as Haiti largely relies on small rural farms and struggles to transport enough food from the countryside to village markets and urban centres. Specific improvements needed to aid the Haitian food system are improved public infrastructure and more paved roads.

== Bibliography ==
- Jared Diamond, Collapse: How Societies Choose to Fail or Succeed, Penguin Books, 2005 and 2011 (ISBN 9780241958681). See chapter 11 entitled "One Island, Two People, Two Histories: The Dominican Republic and Haiti".
