= Madan Sara =

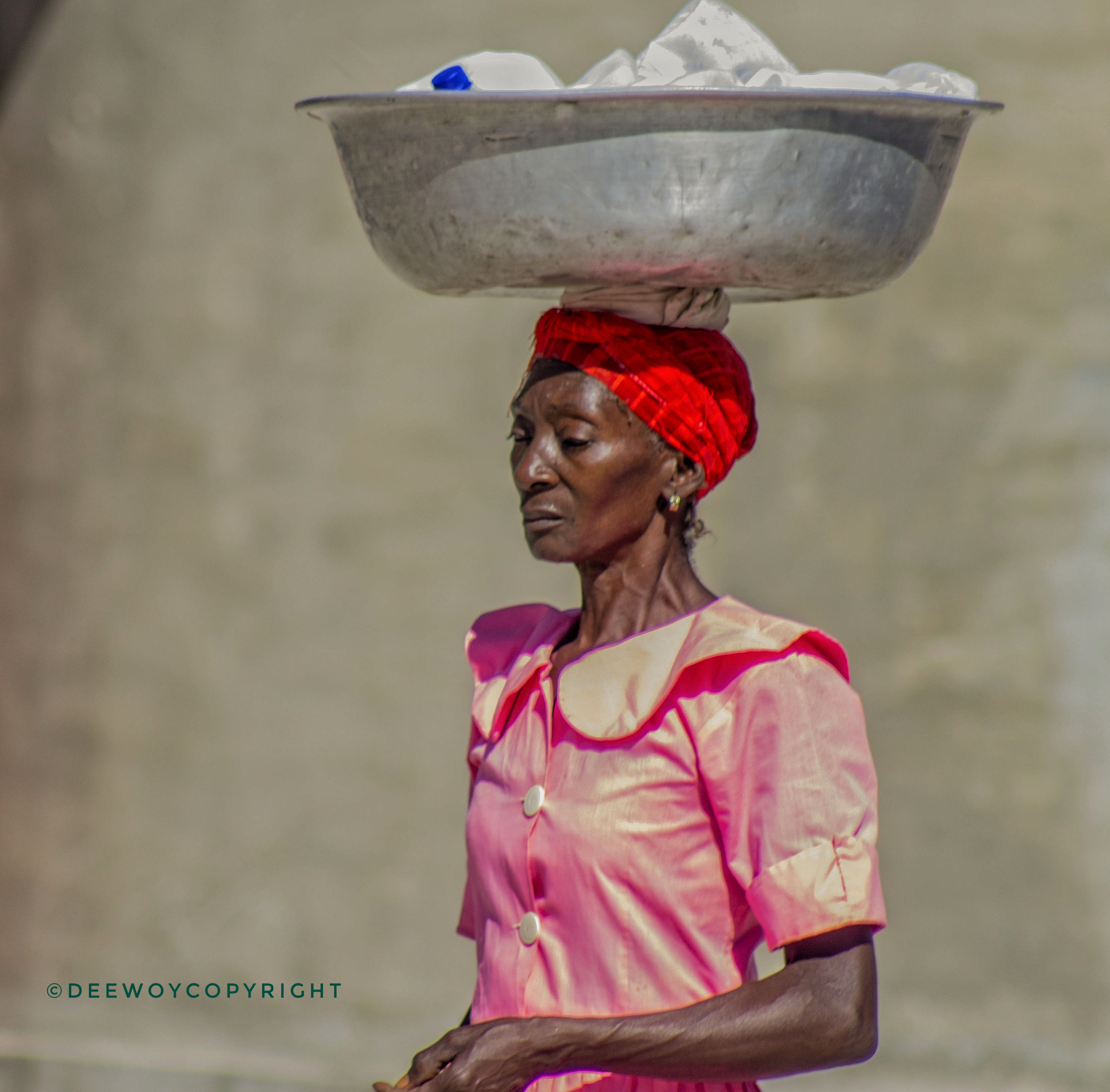

A Madan Sara or Madam Sara (often called Saras), is a woman in Haiti who buys agricultural produce from farmers, transports it to markets, and sells it to merchants. They are an important link between rural producers and urban consumers. An estimated 100,000 women work full or part-time as Madan Saras. They mostly market the produce of small farmers, of whom there are about 700,000. They often provide pre-harvest credit to farmers. Although a few Madan Saras operate internationally and at a large scale, the great majority are small middlemen with little education or capital who are in constant motion between their suppliers in rural areas and their customers in rural and urban markets.

Madan Saras are vulnerable to sexual assault, robbery, exploitation, and rape.

== History ==
The origin of the term "Madan Sara" is the Haitian word for the village weaver, a small, noisy bird that congregates in flocks and often lives in colonies of many nests. The female traders are called the same.

The origin of the Madan Saras was in the 18th century when Haiti was a colony of large plantations utilizing slave labor. On the margins of the plantations the slaves were allowed to cultivate small acreages. Marketing and distribution of crops produced on the slave farms became the job of female slaves. They were allowed to meet at rural crossroads to sell or barter their produce. Women handled marketing because they had more freedom of movement than male slaves. Males were likely to flee the plantation if allowed to travel. Women usually had family ties on the plantation and were less likely to run away. Many of the women became itinerant traders, a characteristic that has endured into the 21st century. Men work the farms; women are often in charge of marketing the crops produced on the farms.

== The Saras ==
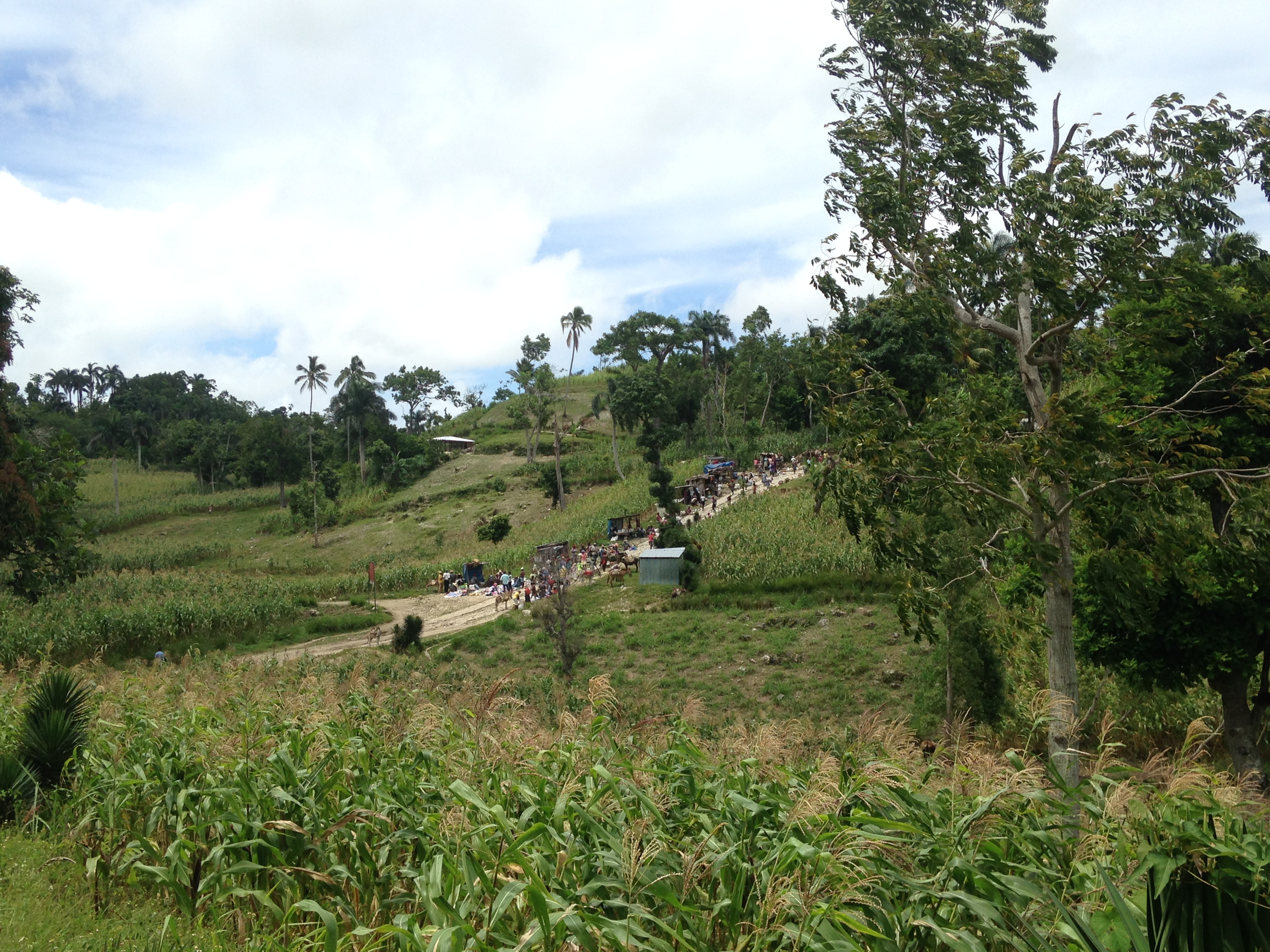
A roadside market in Haiti.

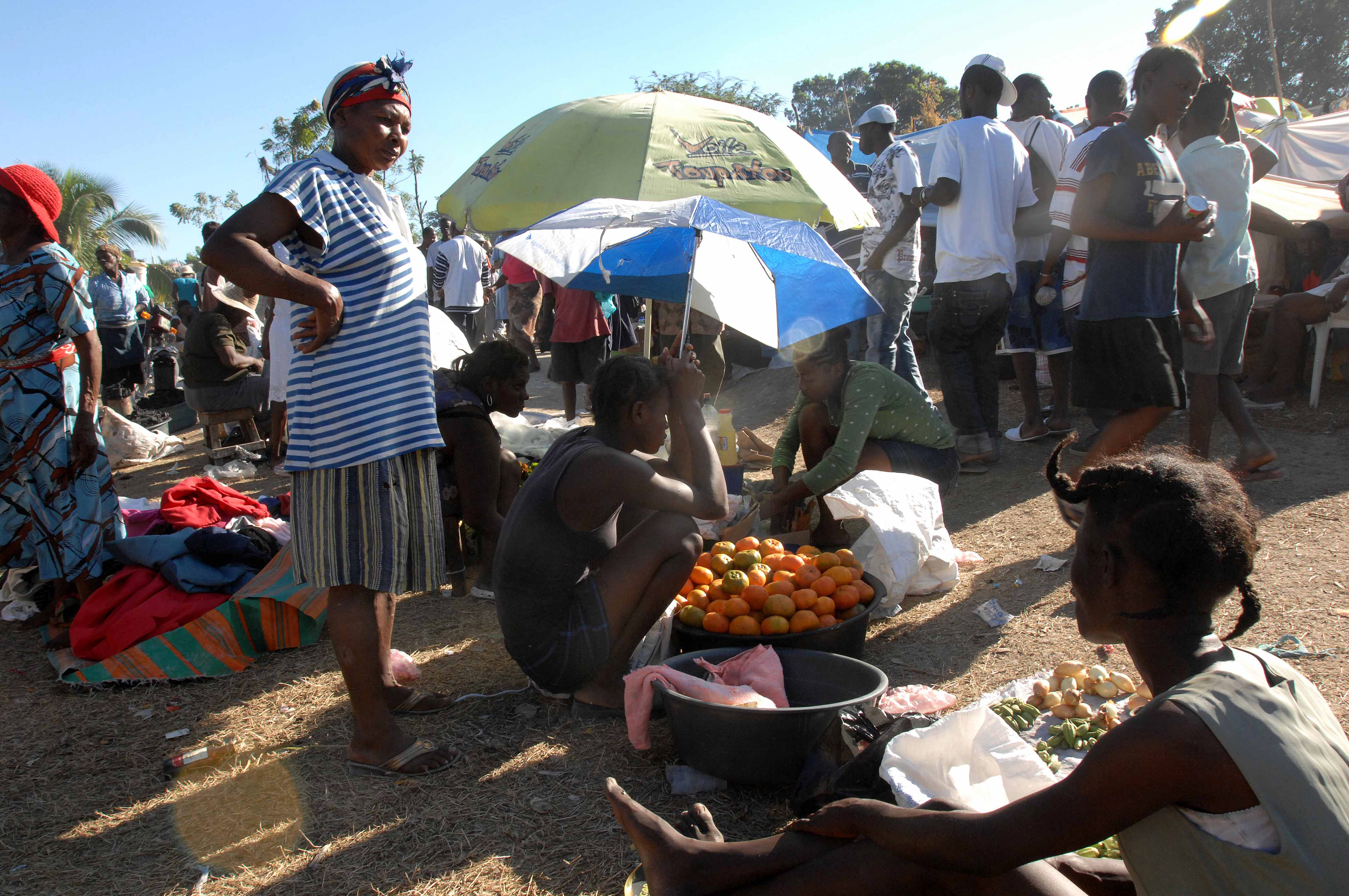
A market in Haiti.

The typical Madan Sara is a poor rural woman of little education. About one-half of them are illiterate, not unusual for Haiti which has a literacy rate of only 61 percent. She will typically have a husband and a family. The husband is a farmer who owns a small plot of land or is self employed. Saras may also own a plot of land which she cultivates herself or hires labor. Most Madan Saras buy produce in the area in which they live or where they have kinship ties. They move their produce on foot, donkey, horse, or public transport to markets, some local and rural, others in the largest cities of Haiti.

Although a few Saras operate with a truckload of produce, most have little capital. Most are among Haiti's poor who number 59 percent of the country's population and survive on less than two U.S. dollars income per day. The World Bank in 2019 estimated that Madan Saras have working capital between 2,000 Haitian gourdes (20 U.S. dollars) and one million Haitian gourdes (50,000 U.S. dollars). In 2002, a scholar found that the average purchase cost of produce by a Sara was 27 U.S. dollars. In 2014, among Madan Saras who journey to the market in the capital and largest city, Port-au-Prince, the average purchase cost of the goods that they transported to the market was 47 U.S. dollars.

What distinguishes Madan Saras from other itinerant traders, in the view of anthropologist Timothy Schwartz, is that the Madan Sara procures agricultural produce at below market rates. She accomplishes this by loaning money to farmers before the harvest to obtain discounts for the final product. She also provides merchandise on credit to retailers in markets. She does not rely on banks for loans to finance her operations, but rather savings groups of Haitians. Given her ability to finance farmers and retailers, plus her capability to minimize transport costs through her intimate knowledge of her region, the Madan Sara can often deliver merchandise to the market at cheaper prices than her larger competitors.

The importance of the Madan Saras in trade is illustrated by the estimate in 2013 that 85 percent of economic activities in Haiti were in the informal sector of the economy in which the Saras operate. The informal sector has been defined as “a diversified set of economic activities, enterprises, jobs and workers that are not regulated or protected by the state”. Most of the jobs in the formal sector of the economy were in Port-au-Prince. Madam Saras "dominate the marketing chain with almost all of the agricultural production marketed in informal markets, rather than in shops and supermarkets."

== Problems ==
Since the 1970s, the ability of Madam Saras to perform their customary role had been impacted by corrupt government, violent criminal gangs, increased imports of food, stagnation of domestic food production, and natural disasters. Haiti is not self-sufficient in agriculture and imports large quantities of food. Haitian farmers and the Madan Saras have been displaced from some markets by imported food. For example, U.S. produced rice and poultry, subsidized by the U.S. government, is cheaper for Haitian consumers than Haitian-grown rice and poultry. As a result, Haitian production of those products has declined since the 1980s.

The work of Madan Saras is dangerous. They are constantly on the move, traveling by various modes of transport from farms in remote areas to markets in urban areas with their products. They often have to pay bribes and suffer physical and verbal abuse. As they are known to carry cash with them, they are subject to robbery. Rape and sexual violence against them is common. They often travel in groups to increase their safety.

== See also ==
- Agriculture in Haiti
- Coffee production in Haiti
- Deforestation in Haiti
- Economy of Haiti
