= Deforestation in Haiti =

Environmental problem

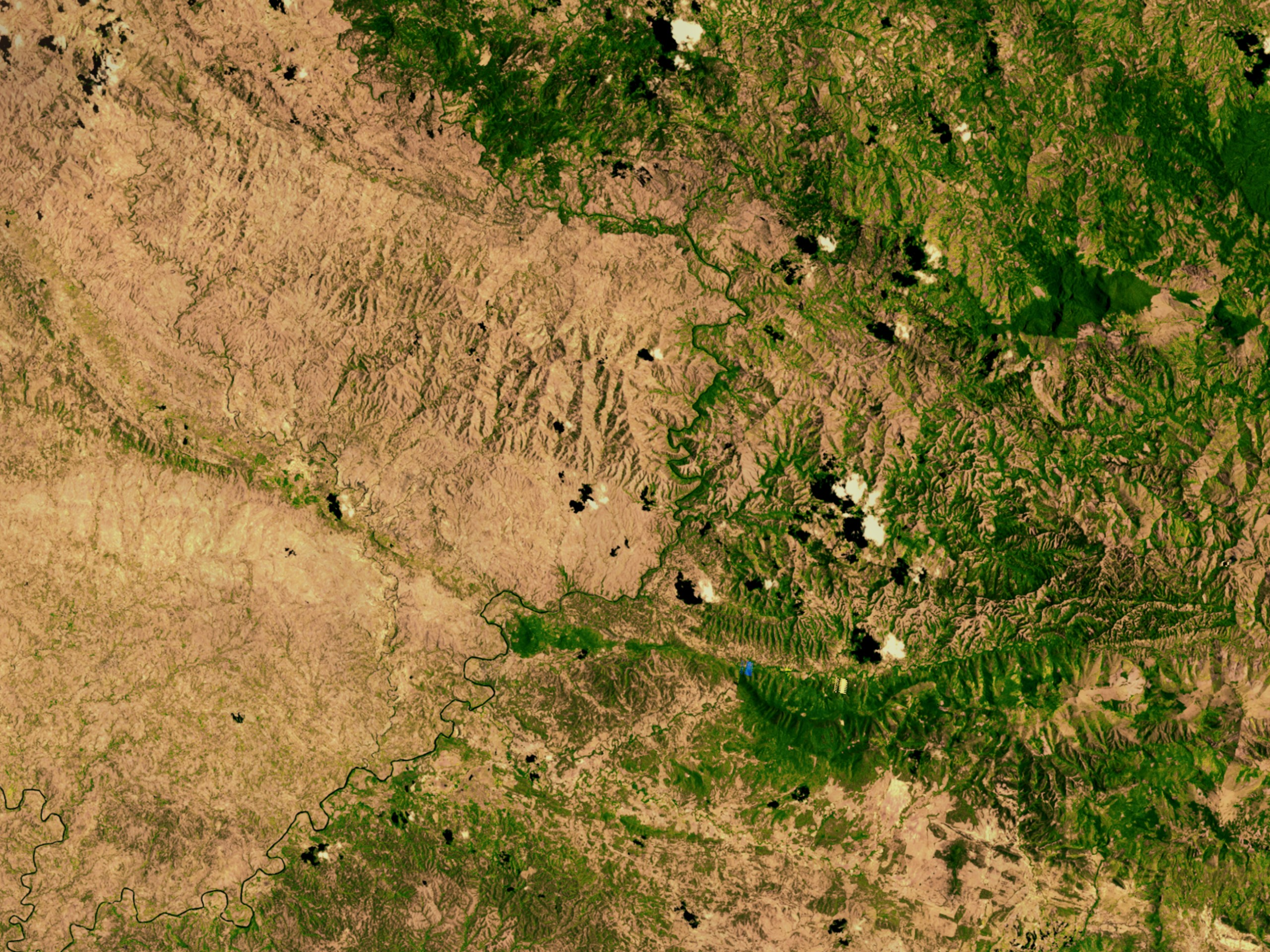
A satellite image of the border between the denuded landscape of Haiti (left) and the Dominican Republic (right)

Deforestation is a complex and intertwined environmental and social problem in Haiti. The most-recent national research on charcoal estimates that approximately 946,500 metric tons of charcoal are produced and consumed annually in Haiti, making it the second-largest agricultural value chain in the country and representing approximately 5% of GDP.

== Dynamics and impact ==
The rapid deforestation of Haiti began during the colonial period, facilitated by slavery of captive Africans, and was intensified when coffee was introduced in 1730. Upland forests were cleared and fifty years later, a quarter of the colony's land was under coffee. The system of plantation monoculture and clean-cultivation between rows of coffee, indigo, tobacco, and sugarcane exhausted soil nutrients and led to rapid erosion.

Following the Haitian Revolution, the government was forced to export timber throughout the 19th century to pay off a 90 million franc indemnity to France due to French claims of lost property, including the formerly enslaved population. For more than a century, the original sum plus interest had to be paid in the form of installments on the timber. Though no longer under colonial rule, land remained unequally distributed, and most people were granted access only to marginal slopes between 200 and 600m above the fertile plains and below the zones of coffee production. These hillside soils were particularly susceptible to erosion when cleared for farming.

Most of the deforestation, however, occurred during the second half of the 20th century. In 1950, forest still covered about 50% of Haiti's territory. It had declined to a mere 8% by 1970, and was nearing 2% in the early 1980s.

Deforestation sped up after Hurricane Hazel drowned trees throughout the island in 1954. Beginning in about 1954, concessionaires stepped up their logging operations in response to Port-au-Prince's intensified demand for charcoal. Deforestation accelerated, which had already become a problem because of environmentally unsound agricultural practices, rapid population growth, and increased competition over land. Techniques that could make forestry more productive for fuel like coppicing and pollarding were not used.

=== Soil erosion ===
The most direct effect of deforestation is soil erosion. An estimated 15,000 acres (61 km^{2}) of topsoil are washed away each year, with erosion also damaging other productive infrastructure such as dams, irrigation systems, roads, and coastal marine ecosystems. Soil erosion also lowers the productivity of the land, worsens droughts, and eventually leads to desertification, all of which increase the pressure on the remaining land and trees.

=== Targeting of Dominican Republic forests ===
Dominican military officials have created a lucrative charcoal trade, and have hired Haitian labor to produce charcoal just over the border. Much of this charcoal is destined for Puerto Rico and the United States mainland, although a small amount crosses over the border into Haiti. Some estimates calculate the illegal movement of 115 tons of charcoal per week from the Dominican Republic to Haiti in 2014, but these estimates are based on incomplete surveys and the numbers are highly contested. Dominican officials estimate that at least 10 trucks per week are crossing the border loaded with charcoal.

The uncertainty around how much charcoal is originating from the Dominican Republic will be settled by a nationwide charcoal production and consumption study financed by the World Bank, and due out in late 2018. This study positioned charcoal truck and charcoal boat enumerators along with all border entry points, at three different week-long periods throughout the year, 24 hours a day. The counts will be extrapolated to the entire year.

== Estimates of forest loss ==
There have been a number of recent national-level forest cover estimates conducted for Haiti, each employing different standards of definition for what constitutes a forest. One study found less than 1% of original primary forest in Haiti based an "old-growth forest", "primordial", or "virgin forest" definition. Another study, applying the United Nations' FAO standard forest definition, found approximately 30% forest cover.

These differences in forest cover estimates for Haiti are emblematic of the different ways people conceptualize and classify what constitutes a forest. Classifications are driven in part by the different viewpoints and agendas of academics, conservationists, policy-makers, and practitioners. The large number of different forest definitions employed in estimates of forest cover—and their varying results—is a well-known global phenomenon and has been well-documented.

The island of Hispaniola was first colonized by humans 6,000 years ago and the population size was likely more than one million when the European colonists first arrived in 1492. Those original inhabitants used trees and caused extinctions of birds and mammals. Nonetheless, the greatest deforestation occurred after 1492.

Before the quantitative analysis of aerial photos and satellite imagery, starting in the 1980s, the pattern and rate of deforestation in Haiti is essentially unknown except for anecdotal reports. However, those quantitative analyses published since 1980 have differed in their estimates of "forest cover", ranging from <1% to 32% of the total land area, with most reporting very low estimates, such as one or two percent.

The most-recent study, published in the journal Forests in 2021, found "a 35% increase [in tree cover] from 2002 to 2010".

The second-most recent study, published in 2020, found "considerably higher forest cover" than reported in earlier studies.

An earlier study, published in 2018 found <1% forest cover using a sophisticated "time series" analysis of satellite imagery that was able to distinguish primary forest, also called old-growth forest. Authors of that 2018 study also determined why a previous satellite imagery analysis published in 2014 found a much higher (32%) percentage of forest cover. Authors of that 2014 study had used the UN global standard definition of what constitutes a "forest" (10% canopy cover), and did not use a time-series analysis to detect primary forest. Primary forest is the most important forest for the preservation of biodiversity. Consequently, the loss of primary forest is the greatest threat to species survival.

Based on one study of forest cover in Haiti, primary forest in the country declined from 4.4% to 0.32% between 1988 and 2016. Those authors estimated that the first of the 50 largest mountains in Haiti lost all of its primary forest (i.e., became "bald") in 1986, and only eight of those 50 mountains had any remaining primary forest by 2016.

In a letter that followed this publication, it was argued that the unusually-strict forest cover definition, which deviated not only from the United Nations standard, resulted in a low forest cover estimate that discounted other known forest types in Haiti, and would have "negative policy reverberations and implications globally". The academic authors of the 2018 study believed the critique from the authors of this letter (policy-makers and practitioners) amounted to "sugarcoating the truth" and that the "best and most-effective policies will follow from unbiased conclusions".

== Tree cover extent and loss ==
Global Forest Watch publishes annual estimates of tree cover loss and 2000 tree cover extent derived from time-series analysis of Landsat satellite imagery in the Global Forest Change dataset. In this framework, tree cover refers to vegetation taller than 5 m (including natural forests and tree plantations), and tree cover loss is defined as the complete removal of tree cover canopy for a given year, regardless of cause.

For Haiti, country statistics report cumulative tree cover loss of 81,348 ha (813.48 km^{2}) from 2001 to 2024 (about 9.5% of its 2000 tree cover area). For tree cover density greater than 30%, country statistics report a 2000 tree cover extent of 858,467 ha (8,584.67 km^{2}). The charts and table below display this data. In simple terms, the annual loss number is the area where tree cover disappeared in that year, and the extent number shows what remains of the 2000 tree cover baseline after subtracting cumulative loss. Forest regrowth is not included in the dataset.

Annual tree cover loss in Haiti, 2001–2024. View chart definition.
Tree cover extent in 2000 minus cumulative tree cover loss in Haiti, 2001–2024 (loss-only residual; does not account for gain). View chart definition.

Annual tree cover extent and loss
Year	Tree cover extent (km2) (Note: This residual measure does not include forest regrowth.)	Annual tree cover loss (km2)
2001	8,559.99	24.68
2002	8,538.79	21.20
2003	8,528.09	10.70
2004	8,504.26	23.83
2005	8,483.93	20.33
2006	8,472.30	11.63
2007	8,451.52	20.78
2008	8,429.60	21.92
2009	8,404.95	24.65
2010	8,384.10	20.85
2011	8,358.46	25.64
2012	8,315.72	42.74
2013	8,283.91	31.81
2014	8,245.33	38.58
2015	8,214.45	30.88
2016	8,041.77	172.68
2017	7,986.78	54.99
2018	7,945.47	41.31
2019	7,901.51	43.96
2020	7,863.49	38.02
2021	7,839.35	24.14
2022	7,820.91	18.44
2023	7,795.36	25.55
2024	7,771.19	24.17

== Environmental efforts ==
Since 2015, the Food and Agricultural Organization of the United Nations (FAO) has initiated the Action Against Desertification in Haiti. The program has implemented the following:

- Land restoration: 11,645 hectares of degraded land was restored by planting 5 million seedlings of local forest and fruit species.
- Income generating activities: Focus was placed on non-timber forest products (NTFPs) ranging from maize and beans to cassava and honey, as well as on the creation of savings and credit unions.
- Job Training: Workshops and training sessions were presented with a focus on restoration.

Most of Haiti's governments have paid only lip service to the imperative of reforestation. The main impetus to act came from abroad. USAID's Agroforestry Outreach Program, Pwojè Pyebwa, was Haiti's major reforestation program in the 1980s. Peasants planted more than 25 million trees under Projè Pyebwa in its first incarnation.

Later efforts to save Haiti's trees focused on intensifying reforestation programs, reducing waste in charcoal production, introducing more wood-efficient stoves, and importing wood under USAID's Food for Peace program. Because most Haitians depend upon wood and charcoal as their primary fuel source, energy alternatives are needed to save the forests. A 15-year Environment Action Plan, authorized in 1999, proposed to stop deforestation by developing alternative fuel sources. Political instability and lack of funding have limited the impact of this reform effort.

Several agencies and companies that produce solar cookers as an alternative to using wood and charcoal have been working in Haiti to establish solutions to the poverty and fuel issues, though their effectiveness and the degree to which they are used are questionable.

== See also ==
- Agriculture in Haiti
- Environment of Haiti
- Environmental issues in Haiti
- Hispaniolan pine forests
