= Pwojè Pyebwa =

Tree-planting project in Haiti

Pwojè Pyebwa (Tree Project) is a tree-planting project in Haiti. It was designed, implemented, and initially run by cultural anthropologists. Different from reforestation projects, Pwojè Pyebwa promoted agroforestry—the strategic mixing of crops, trees, and animals. The agroforestry project in Haiti project was funded by the United States Agency for International Development USAID, but implemented through the Pan American Development Organization (PADF) and CARE. It was originally called the Agroforestry Outreach Project (AOP). The original project spanned a decade (1981–1991), but policies from Pwojè Pyebwa continued to direct PADF tree-planting through a second decade (1992–2000).

The project was executed throughout the country. Based on Haitian farmers’ voluntary and widespread participation, the project has been deemed a success by many. Pwojè Pyebwa distributed free trees to farmers, and advised on the incorporation of trees into existing cropping arrangements based on anthropological research into the land tenure, agricultural systems, and the historical market-orientation of Haitian peasant farmers. The project eventually won the Praxis prize in applied anthropology. It is estimated that the project involved one-third of the entire rural Haitian population. Approximately 65 million trees were planted.

In 2009, follow-up research was conducted in the first area to receive tree seedlings. This research indicated that farmers continue to utilize trees from the project, and drew attention to already existing managed woodlots in the area. These Haitian farmer managed woodlots were documented as the result of historical shifts from exploited woodlands on public land toward the production of domestic firewood and eventually urban-bound charcoal, produced on private land; the woodlots were also examined contemporaneously as a unique Haitian agroforestry system.
