= Environment of Haiti =

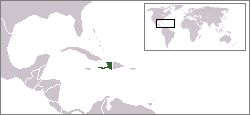
Haiti is located in the Caribbean.

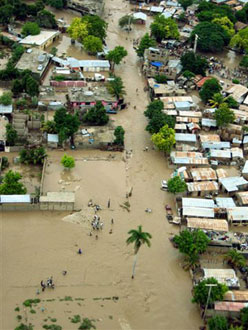
2004 Haiti flood

There have been great challenges to the environment and biodiversity of Haiti. Deforestation in Haiti has left approximately 30% percent of forest cover at present.

== Flora and fauna ==
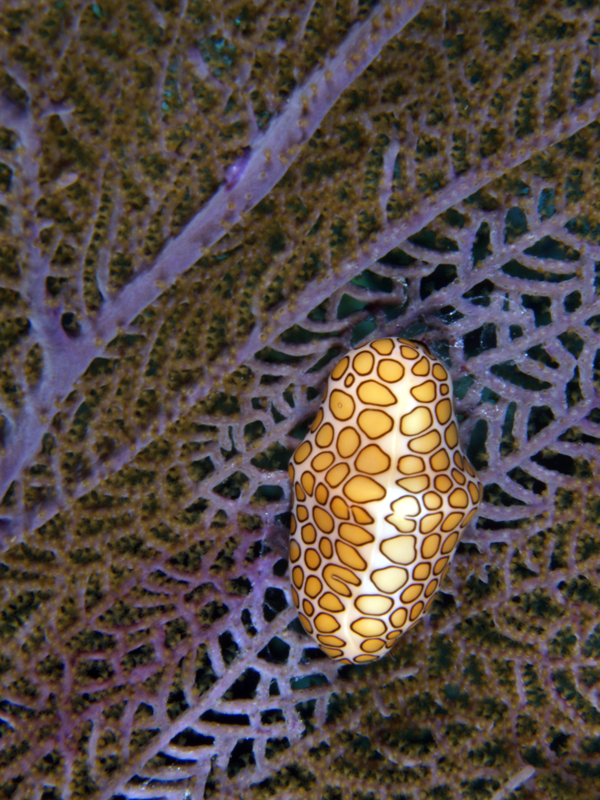
Flamingo tongue on a purple sea fan from Arcadin Islands, Haiti. This sea snail is found living on various species of soft corals and sea fans.

The island of Hispaniola is home to more than 6,000 plants, of which 35% are endemic; and 220 species of birds. None of the birds are endemic to Haiti, but La Selle thrush is nearly so. The country's originally high biodiversity is due to its mountainous topography and fluctuating elevations in which each elevation harbors different microclimates. The country's varied scenery include lush green cloud forests (in some of the mountain ranges and the protected areas), high mountain peaks, arid desert, mangrove forest, and palm tree-lined beaches. Since arrival of aboriginal man, the biodiversity of Haiti has been significantly diminished due to human exploitation. For example, the Caribbean monk seal, the only pinniped ever to occur in the Caribbean, is now extinct.

== Environmental hazards ==
In addition to soil erosion, deforestation in Haiti has caused periodic flooding, as seen on 17 September 2004. Tropical storm Jeanne skimmed the north coast of Haiti, leaving 3,006 people dead in flooding and mudslides, mostly in the city of Gonaïves. Earlier that year in May, floods killed over 3,000 people on Haiti's southern border with the Dominican Republic.

Haiti was again pummeled by tropical storms in late August and early September 2008. The storms—Tropical Storm Fay, Hurricanes Gustav, Hanna and Ike—all produced heavy winds and rain in Haiti. Due to weak soil conditions throughout Haiti, the country's mountainous terrain, and the devastating coincidence of four storms within less than four weeks, valley and lowland areas throughout the country experienced massive flooding. Casualties proved difficult to count because the storm diminished human capacity and physical resources for such record keeping. Bodies continued to surface as the flood waters receded. A 10 September 2008 source listed 331 dead and 800,000 in need of humanitarian aid. The grim state of affairs produced by these storms was all the more life-threatening due to already high food and fuel prices that had caused a food crisis and political unrest in April 2008.

As was the case in 2004, the coastal city of Gonaïves was hit especially hard by the 2008 storms.

There were also major problems in 1999 with hurricanes, leaving 9,398 dead, 10,000 injured and at least 5,000 missing.

== Environmental issues ==
In 1925, Haiti was lush, with 60% of its original forest covering the lands and mountainous regions. Since then, recent in-depth study of satellite imagery has erroneously concluded an estimate of <1% primary forest cover. Erosion has been severe in the mountainous areas. Most Haitian logging is done for agriculture and to produce charcoal, the country's chief source of fuel.

In the 19th century, arable land in the size of 15 hectares was distributed to farmers. It was inherited and divided by their children. In 1971, the average farm size was less than 1.5 hectares. To survive, the landowners had to overuse the land. It became infertile within a few years. The farmers moved to clear steeper hillsides and finally become unemployed. Eventually the shortage of arable land and rising rural poverty pushed peasants from hillside subsistence farms to search for work in Port-au-Prince, where the concentration of desperate people in slums contributed to the country's tragic history of civil strife.

Despite the large environmental crises, Haiti retains a very high amount of biodiversity in proportion to its small size.

== Water supply and sanitation ==
Haiti faces key challenges in the water supply and sanitation sector. Notably, access to public services is very low, their quality is inadequate and public institutions remain very weak despite foreign aid and the government's declared intent to strengthen the sector's institutions. Foreign and Haitian NGOs play an important role in the sector, especially in rural and urban slum areas.

== See also ==
- List of environmental issues
- List of natural disasters in Haiti
