= Agriculture in Haiti =

Road networks in Haiti linking to various agricultural sites

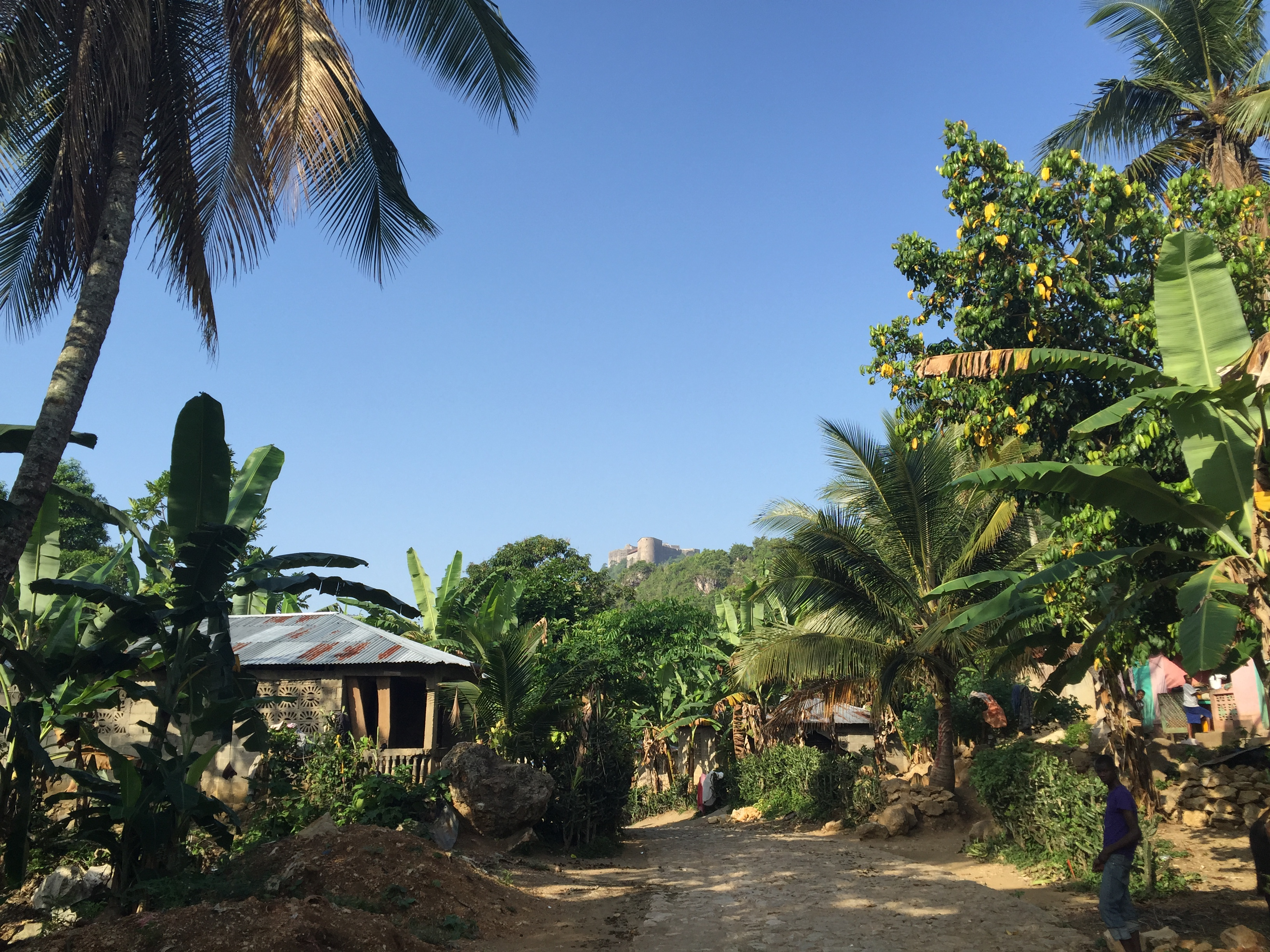
Rural Haiti.

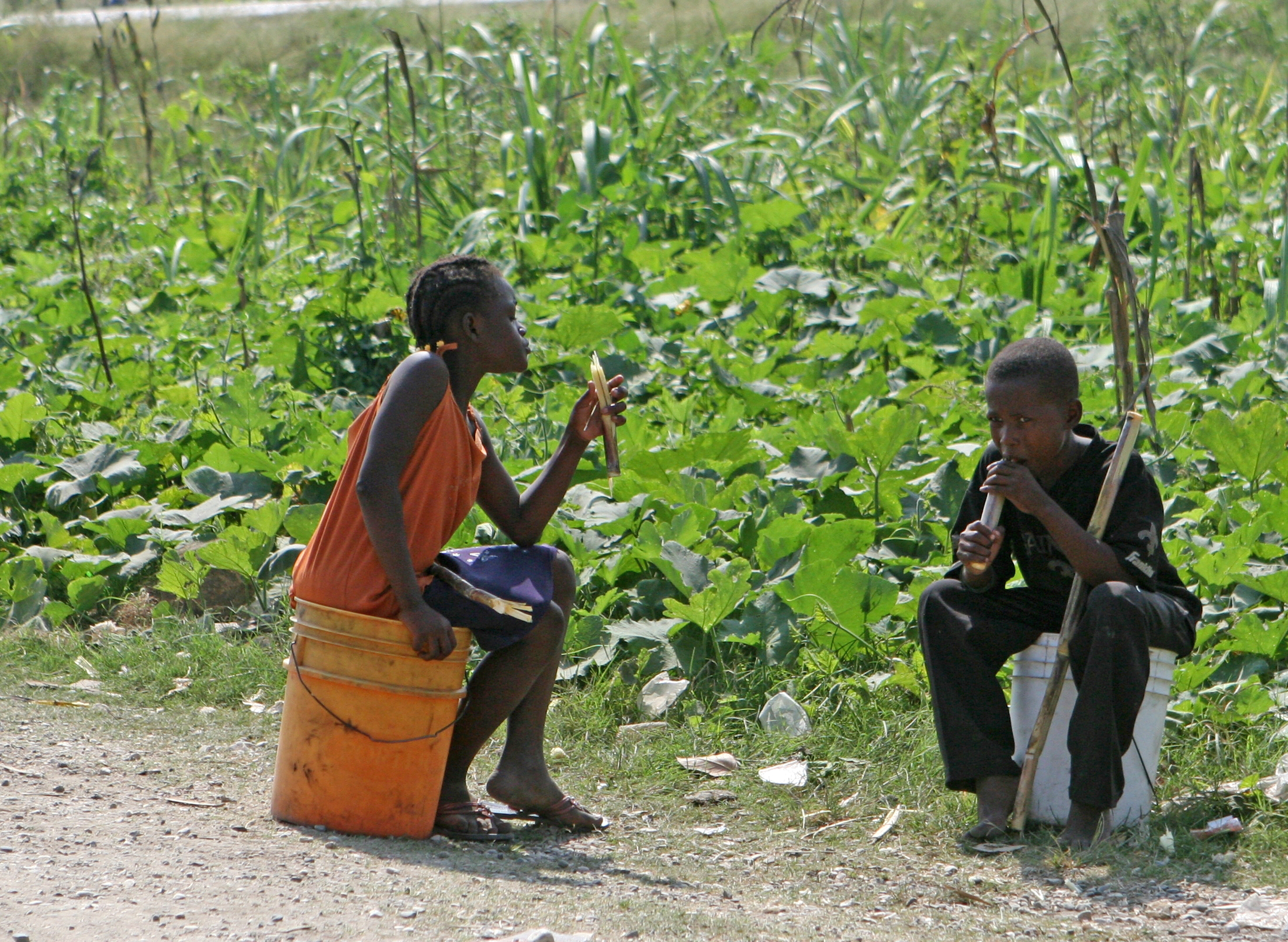
Haitian children chew on sugarcane. The most important crop of Haiti's slave economy in the 18th century, sugarcane is now only a minor crop.

Agriculture in Haiti describes the agricultural history of an island nation once described as the "Pearl of the Antilles". The Taíno people were the farming inhabitants of the island when the Spanish first visited in the late 15th century. The Taino died out from European diseases and exploitation and were replaced with imported African slaves. In the 18th century, Haiti became a country of large plantations, especially of sugar cane, owned by Europeans and worked by hundreds of thousands of slaves. The slaves revolted in 1791 and gained independence from France. The plantations were broken up and the land was distributed to former slaves who primarily engaged in subsistence agriculture with coffee as their most important cash crop and as Haiti's most important export.

In the late 20th and early 21st centuries, authoritarian government, corruption, foreign military interventions, environmental degradation, natural disasters, gang violence, internationally imposed economic policies, and loss of foreign markets for products such as coffee served to make Haiti the poorest country in the Americas. Agriculture in Haiti is largely made up of subsistence farmers who rely on small plots of land to sustain their livelihoods. The country has had to import large quantities of food, especially rice, to feed its populace. Although about 50 percent of Haiti's population was still rural in the 21st century, many farmers have abandoned the land and moved to the cities. Rural conditions have contributed to environmental problems such as soil erosion and deforestation.

== History ==
=== Colonial agriculture ===
Prior to the voyages of Columbus beginning in 1492, a dense population of Taino people lived on the island of Hispaniola, 21st century Dominican Republic and Haiti. The Taino were farmers. Their main crop and dietary staple was Yuca. They also grew sweet potato, maize, cotton, tobacco and a large number of tropical fruits and vegetables. With the colonization of the island by the Spanish in the 16th century, most Taino died from epidemics of European diseases and exploitation. The Spanish colonists, and subsequently the French, imported African slaves to replace the Taino.

France took ownership of Haiti from Spain in the Treaty of Ryswick in 1697. The French believed that the west coast of Haiti was the most fertile land in the West Indies. In the 18th century, Haiti was the "Pearl of the Antilles." Known as Saint-Domingue by the French, Haiti was the richest colony in the world, producing 60 percent of the world's coffee and 40 percent of the sugar imported by France and Britain. Haiti was also an important producer of cotton, indigo, and cacao. Land and agricultural production were in the hands of European and mulatto planters owning about 8,000 plantations and half a million slaves. Haiti's dominance in coffee and sugar production was disrupted during the Haitian Revolution between 1791 and 1804.

The population of Haiti in 1791 is estimated at 556,000: 500,000 slaves, 24,000 free mulattos and blacks, and 32,000 whites. The population was reduced by almost one half during the revolution.

=== After independence ===
After Haiti gained independence in 1804 the government had the priority of maintaining a strong military to fend off French attempts to re-conquer the country. The only way of sustaining the military was the importation of military goods which could only be paid for with exports of agricultural products, but most of the plantations producing the exports were in ruins and their colonial owners dead or departed. The initial efforts of Haiti's government was to continue the plantation system with forced labor, albeit with regulations prohibiting some of the abuses of slavery.

The attempt by the government to maintain the plantation system was unpopular with the former slaves. In 1809 President Alexandre Pétion "decided the agrarian future of Haiti" by initiating a land reform program which ended up with much of Haiti's land being owned by former slaves. By the middle of the 19th century, Haiti became "a society of peasant proprietors given over to a subsistence economy." The numerous farmers of Haiti grew and continue to grow cassava (yuka), maize (corn), bananas, sweet potatoes, plantains, and yams on their small farms, more than 90 percent of which were less than 4 ha (9.9 acres) in size in 2010. Coffee is the main cash crop of the small farmers. Farmers also usually raised a pig or two.

The pattern of individual ownership of small parcels of land continued for more than 100 years despite "increasing pressure for land [due to population increases], the fragmentation of land parcels, and a slight increase in the concentration of ownership." In 1950, 85 percent of Haitian farmers owned land. In 1971, the number of farmers owning land had declined to 60 percent. In that year there were an estimated 616,700 farms in Haiti. The average farmer owned 1.4 ha (3.5 acres) of land divided into several plots. In addition to ownership, many farmers rented land or were sharecroppers. Statistics for Haiti are often questionable, but by 2008/2009, the number of farms may have increased and their average acreage had decreased. FAO estimated there were more than one million farms in Haiti averaging .93 ha (2.3 acres) in size. This increase in the number of farms occurred despite a large migration of former farmers to the cities or to foreign countries.

== Farms and farmers ==
The number of farmers and the contribution of agriculture to Haiti's Gross Domestic Product (GDP) has been declining since the 1950s. In the 1950s, 80 percent of the labor force were farmers and agriculture made up 50 percent of GDP and 90 percent of exports. By the 1980s, 66 percent of the labor force were farmers and they contributed 25 percent of GDP and 24 percent of exports. By 2016, more than 50 percent of the population was still employed in agriculture and it contributed 20 percent of GDP.

The Madan Saras (rural women traders) are a unique institution in Haiti. The many Madan Saras buy and transport agriculture produce from farm to market. Women in Haiti have traditionally been the marketers of produce while men own and cultivate the land.

Reflecting the decline in fertility of Haitian soils due to erosion, agriculture production has been stagnant since 1980 despite increases in cultivated land and resources devoted to agriculture.

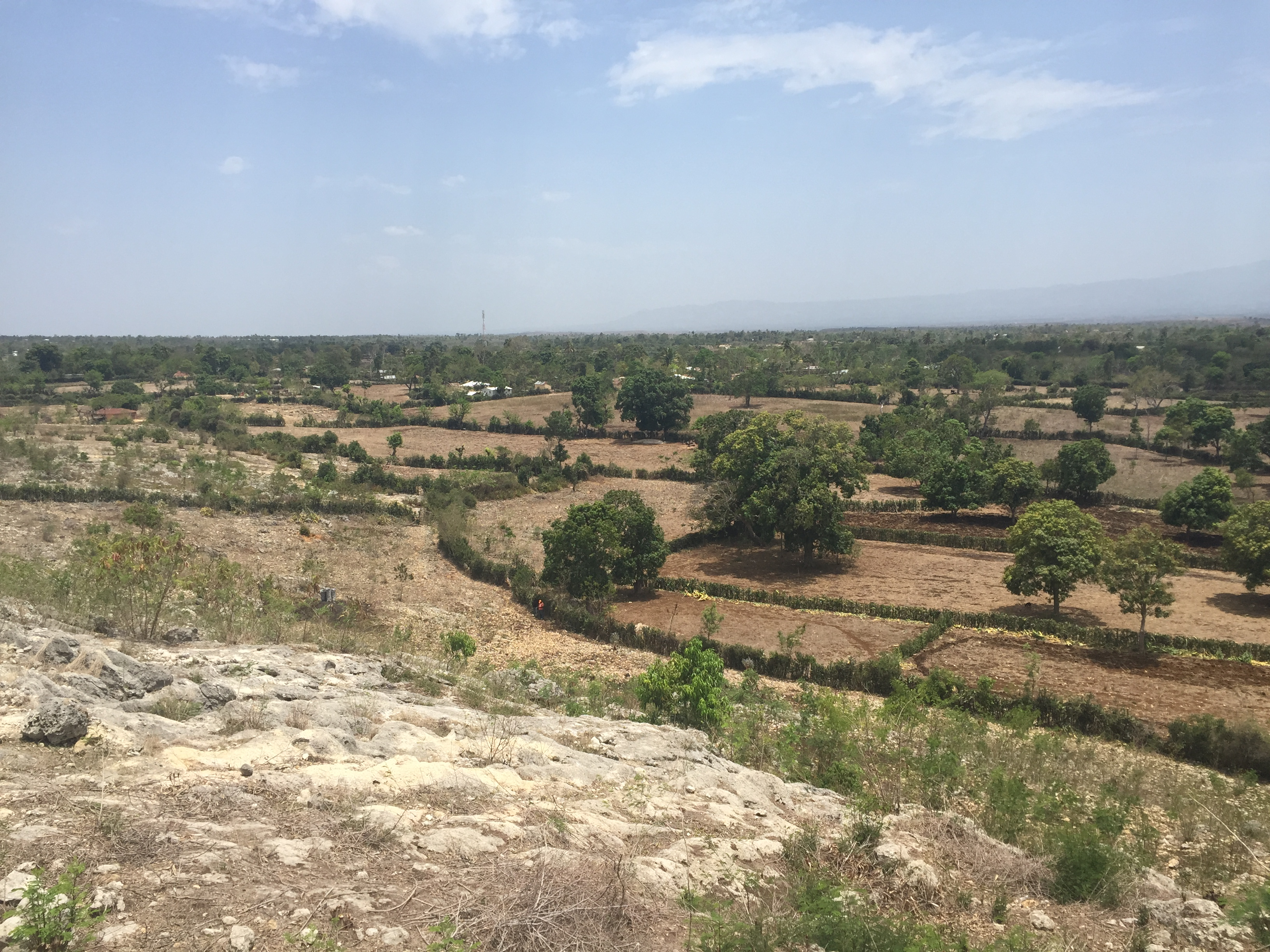
Small, individually owned plots of land characterize Haiti's farmland. Mango trees dot the fields.

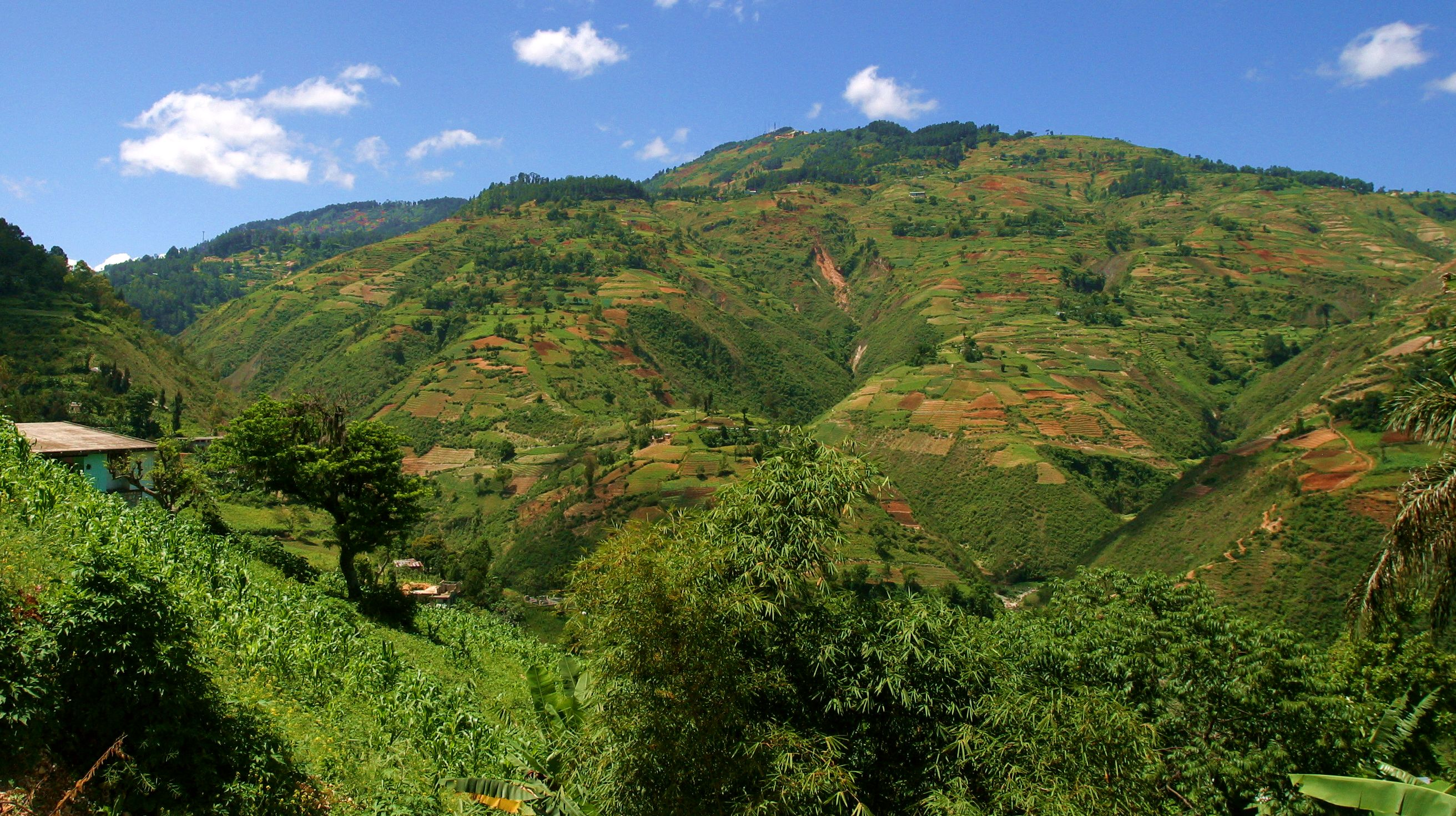
Small farming plots extend up mountain sides.

=== Most valuable crops and livestock (2016) ===
Product	number of hectares planted	Yield (metric tons per ha)	Value to farmers (million dollars)
Bananas and plantains	97,533 ha (241,010 acres)	6.5	222
Haricots (beans)	247,064 ha (610,510 acres)	0.6	133
Cattle			131
Maize (corn)	393,076 ha (971,310 acres)	0.8	127
Pigs			109
Yams	59,186 ha (146,250 acres)	3.5	83
Potatoes	65,942 ha (162,950 acres)	3.6	81
Rice	75,859 ha (187,450 acres)	2.2	73
Charcoal and fire wood			72
Goats			62

=== Sugar ===
The most immediate impact on agriculture of the Haitian revolution was the rapid decline of sugar, produced from sugar cane, as Haiti's most important export and most valuable agricultural product. Prior to the revolution in 1791, Haiti's exports of sugar totaled almost 100 million pounds. By 1820, sugar exports were practically nil. Haiti's biggest customer, France, banned sugar and other exports from Haiti. Some authorities have also attributed the decline of sugar to the repugnance of former slaves for the plantation economy that produced sugar. Palsson adds a third factor: the breakup of large plantations and the distribution of land to former slaves which increased transaction costs and resulted in a scarcity of capital, expertise, and labor. Large investments in sugar processing and large farms, or cooperative ventures among small farmers, were necessary for commercially viable sugar production. Instead, former slaves worked individually on their own newly acquired small farms. The government of Haiti also banned foreign investment in Haiti. The U.S. occupiers eliminated the ban in 1918, but the proliferation of land ownership made acquiring and aggregating sizeable acreages of land for sugar production too complicated for prospective foreign investors. Sugar never regained its prominence, becoming only a minor crop in Haiti.

=== Coffee ===
With the demise of sugar plantations in the early 19th century, coffee became the chief export crop of Haiti and continued to be Haiti's most important export until the 1980s. Unlike sugar cane, coffee was mostly cultivated by families on small plots of land. Also unlike sugar, coffee is a highland crop, being grown in Haiti at elevations ranging from 400 m (1,300 ft) to 1,300 m (4,300 ft). The best quality of coffee is grown at elevations of higher than 900 m (3,000 ft).

Coffee production and exports peaked in the 1950s which have been called a "golden age" for Haiti. Commodity prices were high; the Haitian currency was stable; tourism was flourishing and Haiti was one of the largest producers of coffee in the world. Production reached an all-time high of 740,000 metric tons in 1955. Coffee production reached another high in 1973 of 660,000 metric tons, but then quickly declined to 372,000 metric tons in 1990 and 180,000 tons in 2014. In 2014–2015, 80 percent of coffee production was wiped out due to a combination of disease, insects, and drought. Production in 2019 was estimated at 21,000 metric tons with most consumed in Haiti.

Coffee exports declined ever more steeply from comprising 40 percent of Haiti's exports in the 1970s to less than one percent in 2017. Exports were 42,900 metric tons in 1987 and 21,000 tons in 2007. However, a substantial amount of coffee was smuggled across the border into the Dominican Republic (DR) and, thus, did not enter into the production and export statistics. In 2011, coffee smuggling to the DR was estimated to total 7,200 metric tons (120,000 60 kg. bags).

=== Vetiver ===
Vetiver is a species of grass, native to India, whose roots contain an oil used to make perfume. Vetiver, if allowed to grow unharvested, is also useful in combatting soil erosion. Haiti is the world's largest producer of vetiver with exports of essential oils, mostly vetiver, totalling 16 million dollars in 2012. Vetiver is grown by about 30,000 small-scale farmers in southwestern Haiti. The vetiver industry is described as "secretive and extractive: cheap labor by smallholders and environmentally damaging harvest practices leave profits among producers, exporters, and scent producers."

=== Mangoes ===
Next to vetiver, mangoes were Haiti's most important export crop in 2012, earning 13 million dollars. The United States was the main market. However, on 24 October 2022, the United States closed its pre-inspection program for Haitian mangoes because of safety concerns for its workers in Haiti; this suspended Haitian export of mangoes to the United States.

== Problems and foreign interventions ==
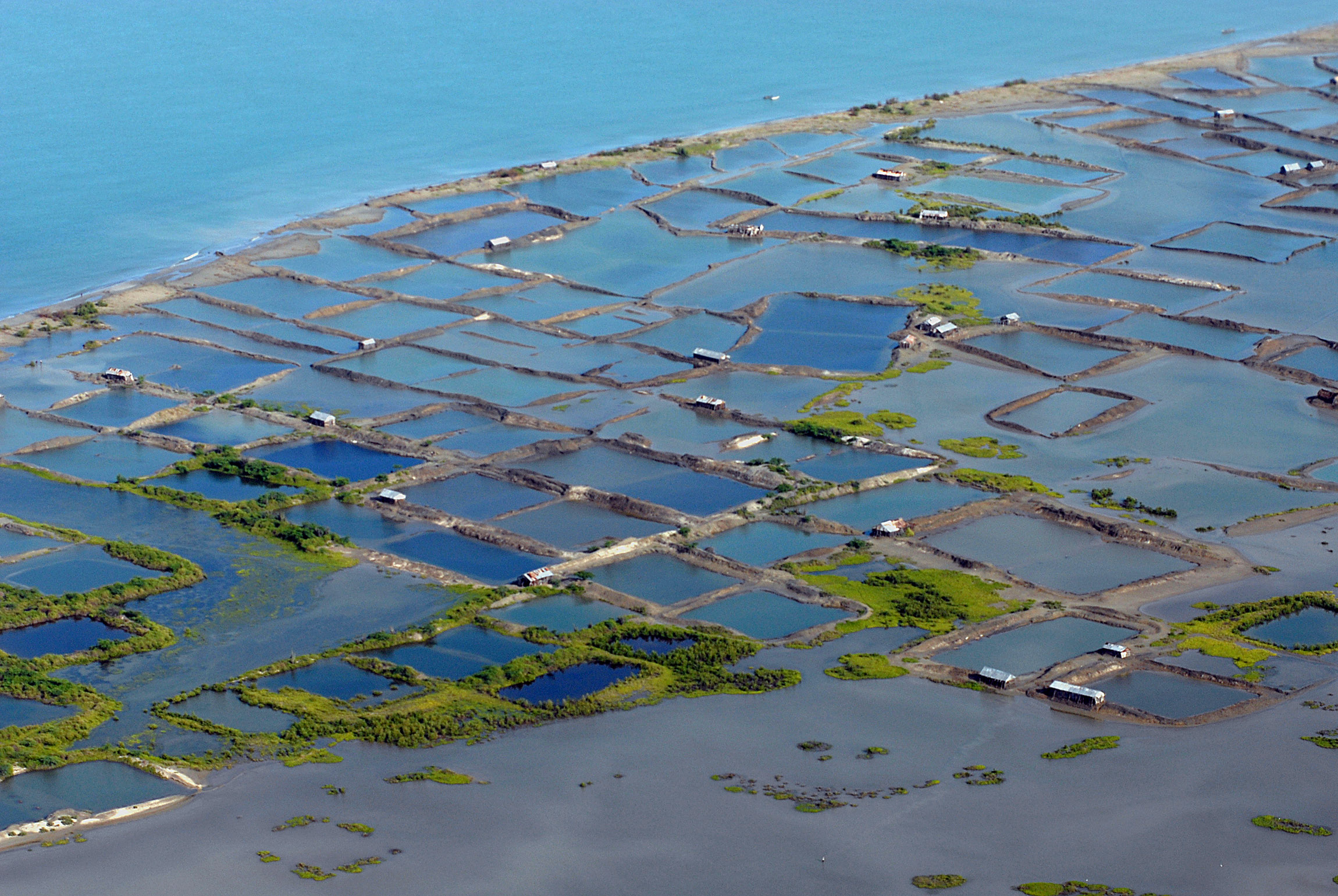
Haiti is prone to natural disasters. This photo shows flooded fields after the 2008 hurricane.

A byproduct of Haiti's independence was the obligation forced upon it in 1825 by a French fleet of warships to pay annual "reparations" for the land and property (mostly slaves) seized from French citizens. The indemnities, and the loans the government took out to pay them, were not liquidated until 1947. They took up to 40 percent of the government's revenue some years and severely reduced its capacity to invest in infrastructure and agricultural development. Taxes on Haitian citizens to pay the "independence debt" were high. Moreover, corruption, and large military expenditures soaked up most of the remainder of government resources. In the 20th century, the U.S. replaced France as the most influential foreign country in Haiti. A major objective of several U.S. military interventions in the country was debt collection. The repressive governments of the Duvalier dynasty (1957–1986) and recurrent natural disasters added to the misery inflicting Haiti and impacting the economy.

The result was that Haiti was, by the late 20th century, "a spectacularly failed state — a shadow Haiti unable to provide the basic necessities of life for its people." From the 1970s onward international financial institutions, the United States, and United Nations attempted to assist in the revival of Haiti's prosperity in agriculture. The prescriptions of the international community often proved to cause more harm than good. In 2023/2024, Haiti ranked 159th out of 185 countries in the United Nations Development Program's (UNDP) Human Development Index, reflecting the generally poor conditions for Haitians living in the country.

=== Swine flu ===
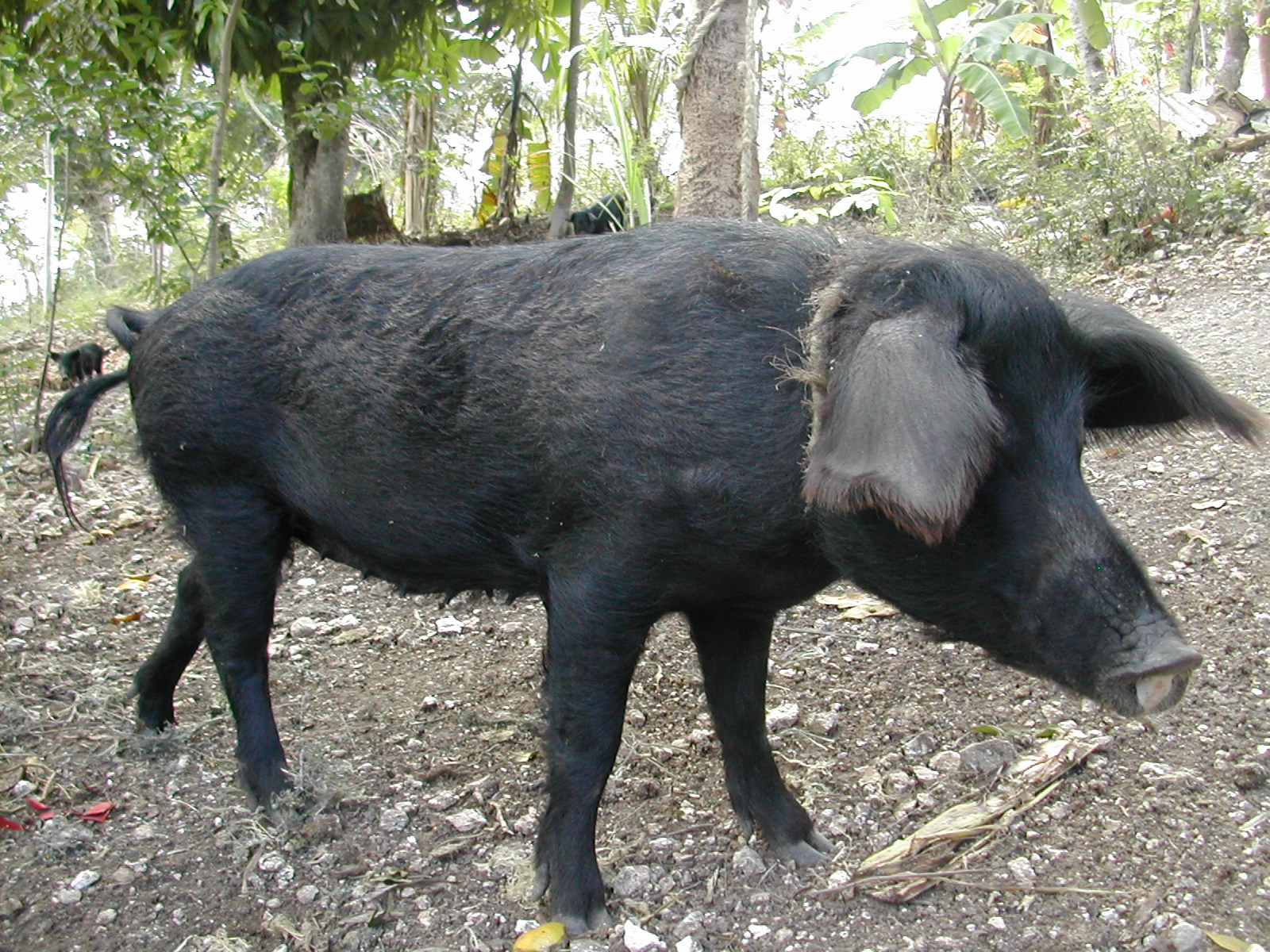
The small hardy Creole Pig is important to Haitian farmers.

Until the 1980s Haitian farmers raised small, hardy black pigs, called Creole pigs, on their farms. Often a family owned only a single pig but with the sale of a fattened pig Haitian farmers "could afford to feed, clothe, and send your child to school." On average, pigs represented 30 percent of a farmer's income.

In 1978, African swine fever broke out in the swine population of neighboring Dominican Republic. To prevent the disease from spreading the Haitian government ordered all pigs located within 15 km (9.3 miles) from the border to be slaughtered without compensation to the farmers. Still under threat from swine flu in 1981, a consortium of international financial organizations and the United States, Canada, and Mexico initiated a program with the Haitian government to slaughter all the pigs in Haiti to prevent the spread of the disease. Over the next three years, about 400,000 pigs were slaughtered and 600,000 died of disease. Haitian farmers whose pigs were slaughtered were compensated for their loss with 9.5 million dollars, 24 dollars per slaughtered pig.

The U.S. Agency for International Development (AID) looked upon the slaughter as an "opportunity to improve the productivity of the Haitian swine industry" AID introduced new breeds of disease-free pigs, but the pigs did not adapt well to Haiti and not until 2002 did pork production in Haiti reach pre-epidemic levels. During those years and partially attributed to the swine flu epidemic and its aftermath, Haitian farmers lost income, food insecurity rose to 47 percent of the population, school enrollment dropped 14 percent, and the rural population decreased by 15 percent.

=== Rice and chicken ===
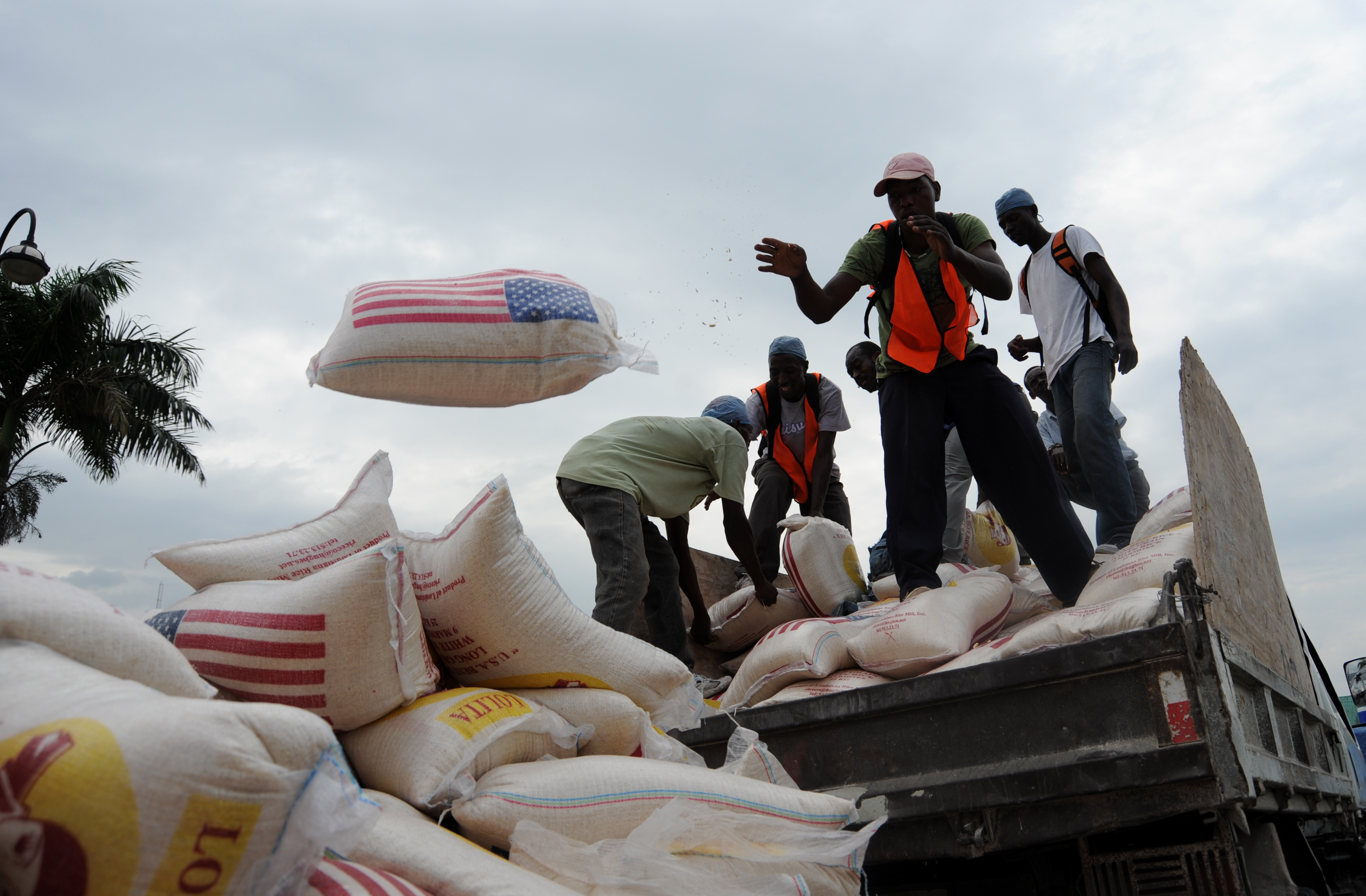
American rice imported into Haiti after a 2010 earthquake.

Until the mid-1980s, Haiti was nearly self sufficient in rice production, importing less than five percent of its consumption from the United States. In 1986, the World Bank, International Monetary Fund (IMF), and U.S. AID provided 153 million dollars in credits and loans to Haiti for economic reforms. In 1994, the IMF provided another credit. The economic reforms required of Haiti by these loans and credits included reduced tariff levels on imports, a free-floating exchange rate for Haitian currency, and the elimination of import quotas. Haiti reduced the tariff for imported rice from 50 percent to 3 percent.

The reduction in tariffs and elimination of import quotas resulted in a decrease in Haitian rice production and a rapid increase in Haitian imports of cheaper rice from the United States. Rice production in the United States is subsidized by the government. In the early 2000s, 9,000 rice growers in the United States received almost one billion dollars in subsidies which made American rice cheaper than Haitian-grown rice. As a result, imports of rice from the United States which were 7,300 tons in 1980 rose to become 375,000 tons in 2023. Rice imports from the United States cost Haiti 264 million dollars in 2023. Rice became the largest Haitian agricultural import. The dependence on foreign rice and other imports put Haiti at the mercy of fluctuating commodity prices. Also, floating the Haitian currency, the gourde, as required by the foreign donors, resulted in the devaluation of the gourde which increased the cost of imports.

As a result of the agricultural policy in Haiti supported by the international community, the production of rice in Haiti dropped from 163,000 metric tons in 1985 to 89,000 tons in 1995. Rice production in Haiti since 2005 has averaged 114,400 tons per year. The drop in rice production forced many farmers to migrate to the cities in search of employment and, as cheap American rice became a dietary staple in Haiti, reduced the demand for maize and also displaced former maize farmers.

Chicken is Haiti's second-largest agricultural import from the United States, costing the country 79 million dollars in 2023. The growth in chicken imports by Haiti is also attributed to trade liberalization and the subsidies, indirect in the case of chickens, given to American producers by the government. American firms found a ready market in Haiti for the cheaper and less desirable parts of chicken which they had trouble selling in the United States. Haitian farmers were unable to compete.

World leaders, including former U.S. President Bill Clinton and UN Humanitarian Coordinator John Holmes, later apologized for the international program reducing tariffs on food imports into Haiti. The program "by loosening trade barriers...exacerbated hunger in Haiti."

=== Environmental degradation ===
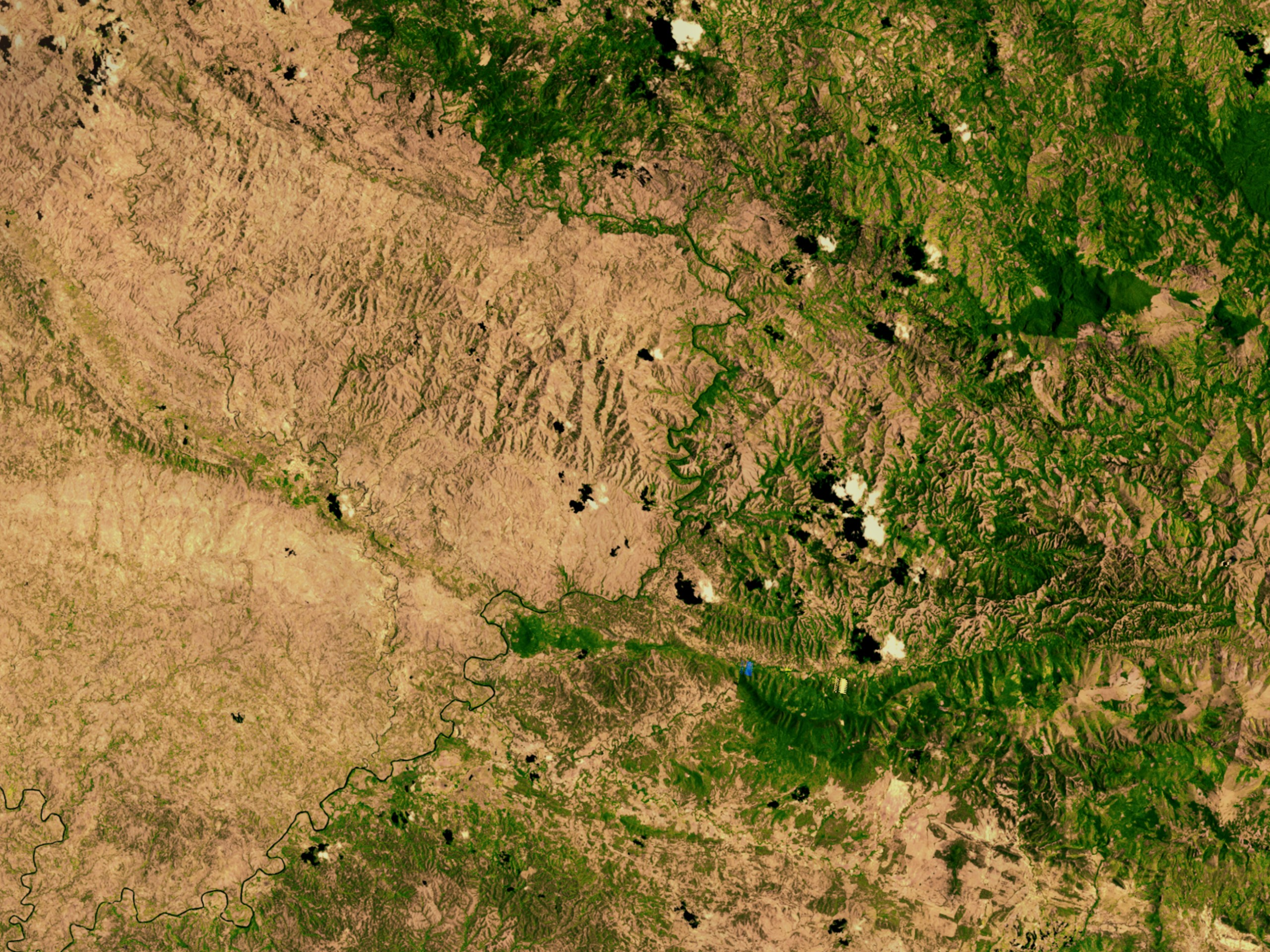
Illustrating deforestation, land in Haiti is on the left in this photo and land in the Dominican Republic is on the right.

Haiti is a densely populated country with more than 11 million people crowded into an area of less than 28,000 km^{2} (11,000 sq mi). The country's recent history reflects an inability to produce enough food to feed its population. The cause of that is partially, perhaps mostly, due to the degradation of the environment for agriculture, especially since the mid-20th century. The decline in the productivity in agriculture can be traced to deforestation, the resultant erosion, and population pressure on the land. Natural disasters such as hurricanes, drought, and earthquakes have also played a role in the decline of agricultural productivity. In 2024, Haiti ranked 149th among 180 countries in the Environmental Performance Index as calculated by Yale University.

Haiti has a tropical climate and the natural vegetation of all the island, except for a small area of semi-arid land, is forest. Extensive deforestation began with the beginning of the European-owned plantation economy in the 17th and 18th century. In 1950, 60 percent of the country was still forested, but that percentage declined to 2 percent in the 21st century. Population pressure forced farmers to cultivate mountainous areas. Among causes of the deforestation were the demand by the populace for firewood and the production of charcoal, made by cutting down forests, as a much needed cash crop for farmers. Deforestation caused erosion of top soil and erosion led to a greater incidence of floods. Floods in 2008 destroyed 60 percent of Haiti's harvest of agricultural products.

== Downward spiral ==
The decline of Haitian agriculture which began in the 1970s or 1980s continued in the 21st century. The economy of Haiti, measured by Gross Domestic Product, declined each year from 2019 to 2023. Agriculture production mirrored that decline. Rice production decreased 19 percent over this five-year period and production of maize and sorghum, the other important cereal crops, also decreased. Yields per acre for these crops declined. The downward spiral of Haitian agriculture was mostly due to political instability and gang violence in the countryside which caused many farms to be abandoned with their proprietors fleeing to the cities. Farm to market access became more difficult, also because of gang violence. Five million Haitians in 2024 were estimated by international organizations to face food insecurity.

== See also ==
- Deforestation in Haiti
- Economy of Haiti
