= Camp Roosevelt =

Camp Roosevelt may be:

- Camp Roosevelt, part of the Katahdin Scout Reservation
- Camp Theodore Roosevelt/R-C Scout Ranch - Arizona
- Roosevelt Scout Reservation - Salem County, New Jersey
- NF-1, Camp Roosevelt - (Camp Roosevelt Recreation Area), George Washington National Forest
- Camp Roosevelt, Irondale Scout Reservation
- Camp Roosevelt, Gettysburg Battlefield camps after the American Civil War
- Camp Roosevelt, Stalag VI-A, Hemer
- Camp Roosevelt (Chesapeake)
- Camp Roosevelt, Culebra, Puerto Rico
