= Cayo Norte =

Privately owned island of Puerto Rico

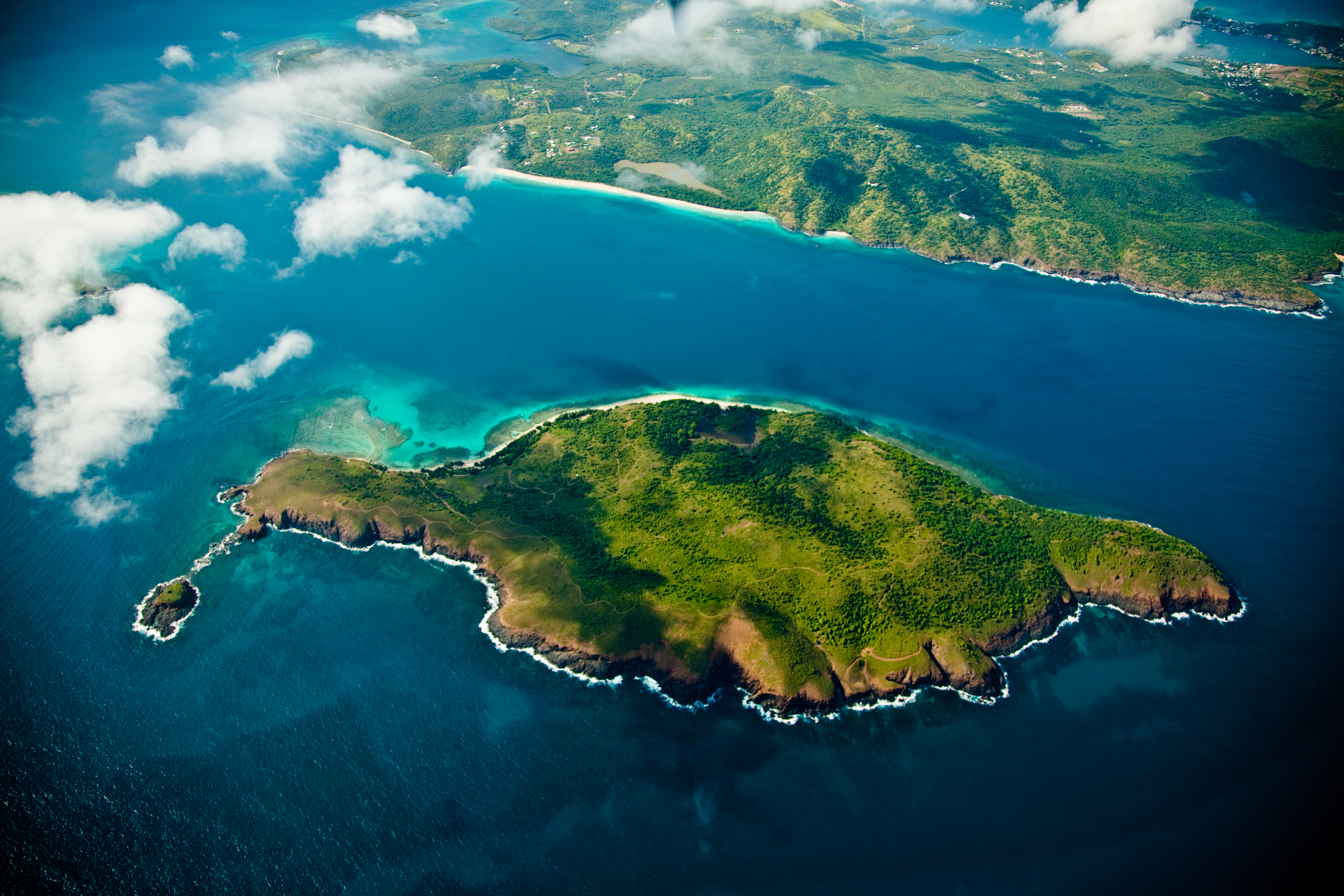
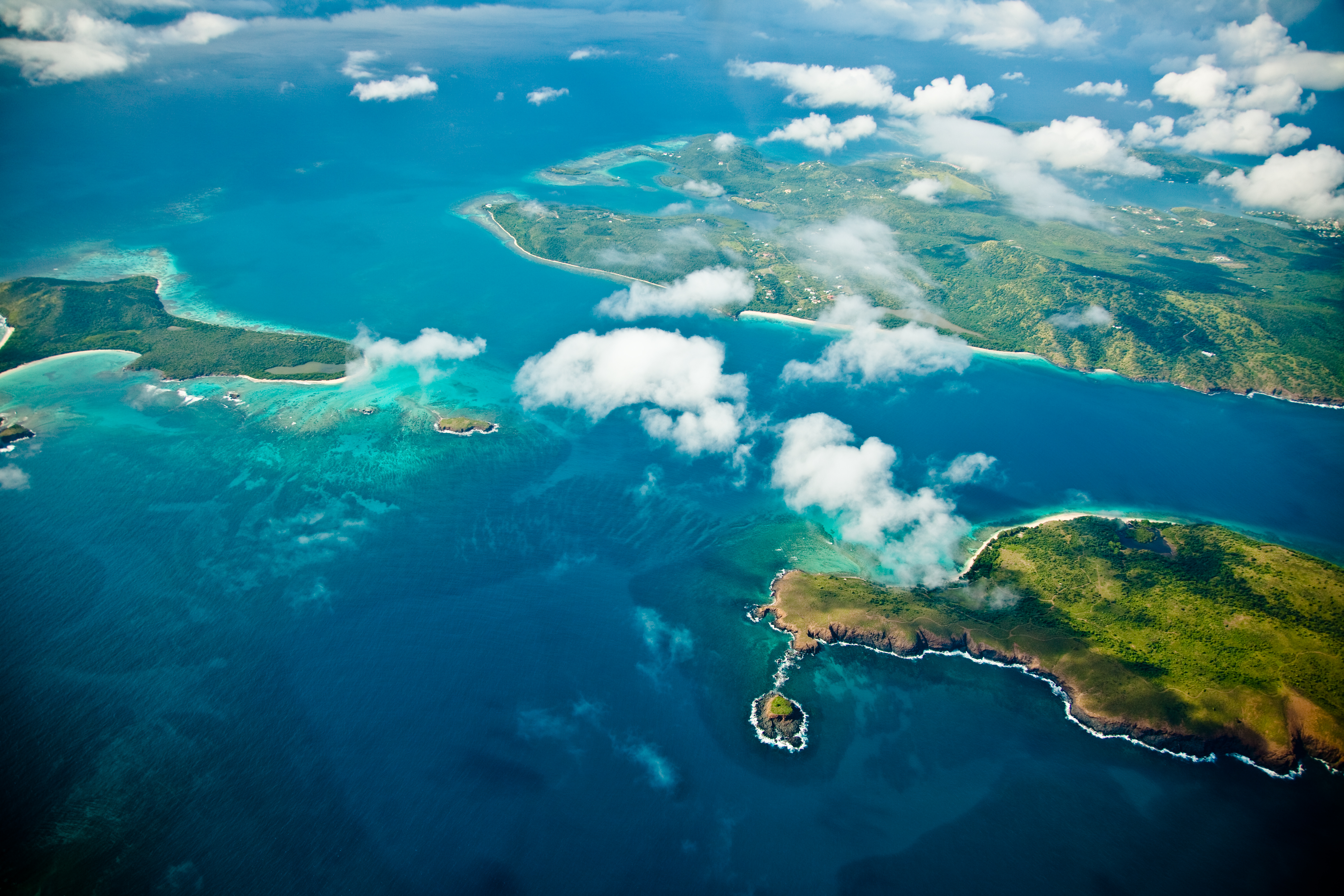
- Aerial view of Cayo Norte (foreground) off the eastern coast of Culebra Island (background), 2010 Aerial view of Cayo Norte (right) and Culebrita (left) off the eastern coast of Culebra Island (background), 2010

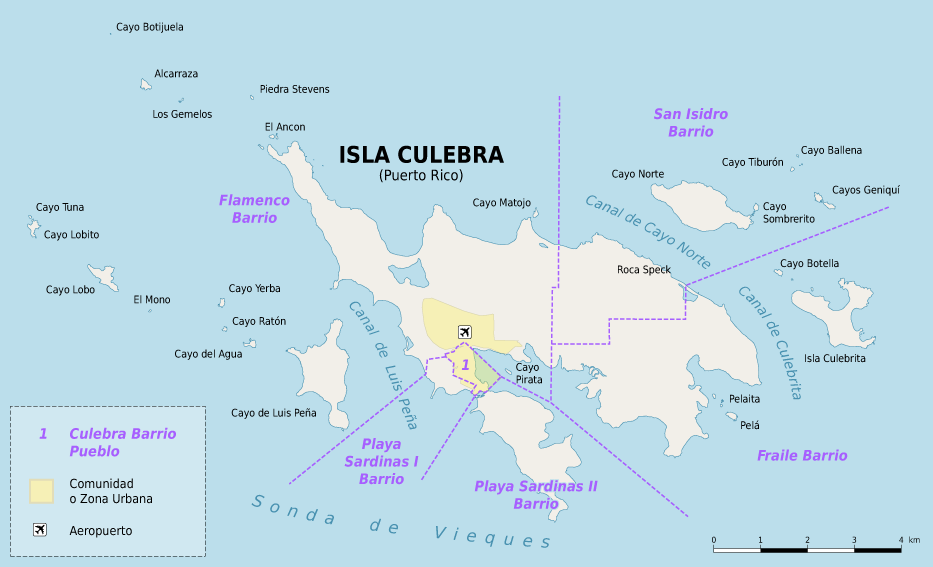
- Map of Culebra by barrios

- Location within Puerto Rico Location within Lesser Antilles Location within the Caribbean
- Interactive map

Geography
- Location: Caribbean Sea
- Coordinates: 18°20′N 65°15′W
- Archipelago: Puerto Rico Archipelago, Greater Antilles
- Area: 1.2 km^{2} (0.46 sq mi)
- Highest elevation: 103.6 m (339.9 ft)

Administration
- Puerto Rico
- Commonwealth: Puerto Rico
- Municipality: Culebra
- Barrio/Ward: San Isidro

Demographics
- Population: 0

Additional information
- Time zone: AST (UTC-4)

Cayo Norte (Spanish for "North Cay" or "North Key"), also historically known as West Key or North East Key, is the largest privately owned archipelago and island of Puerto Rico. Currently the property of Google co-founder Larry Page via SVI Investments, Inc, the island is located about 0.6 nautical mile (1.0 km) northeast of island-municipality of Culebra Island, about 21 nautical miles (36 km) east of the main island of Puerto Rico and 12 nautical miles (20 km) west of St. Thomas, U.S. Virgin Islands. The island is part of the municipality of Culebra and therein of the barrio San Isidro. It is the only privately owned island in the Culebra archipelago, and is not part of the Culebra National Wildlife Refuge as are most of the other nearby islands and keys.

== Geography ==
Cayo Norte is the first island to starboard when traveling through the Virgin Passage from the Atlantic Ocean to the Caribbean Sea. It is somewhat oval in shape, with hills gently sloping to the sandy beaches on the south coast. The north coast is a rocky cliff. The highest elevation, located in the middle of the western half of the island, is at 340 feet (104 m). Its area is about 300 acres (121 ha). The hills on the eastern half of the island are mostly covered with bushes (croton rigidus). There are wooded zones along the south coast, in the valleys and on the western slopes.

== History ==
In 1895, during the initial Spanish colonization of Culebra Island, title to Cayo Norte was ceded to José Morales and Francisco de los Santos. In 1902 title was conveyed to Leopoldo Padrón. Majority ownership of Cayo Norte stayed in the Padrón family until 2004. In 2006 100% ownership was acquired by SVI Investments, Inc., a family corporation, for use as a private retreat. Cayo Norte is the only island in the Culebra archipelago that was not subject to bombardment by the U.S. Navy. A study made for the U.S. Army Corps of Engineers in 2007 states that "Impact of Cayo Norte was planned [in 1924] but that difficulties clearing people and cows from the island kept it from being used for an impact area. No UXO has been identified on Cayo Norte."

In 2018, Google co-founder Larry Page purchased the island for $32 million through two transactions – the first for a large parcel of land on the island, priced at $28.7 million, followed by another smaller purchase of $3.4 million. The transactions were made through U.S. Virgin Island Properties, an LLC belonging to him and his wife, Lucinda Southworth.

== Wildlife ==
The U.S. Fish and Wildlife Service identified a beach on the southcoast of Cayo Norte as a critical habitat for two species of endangered sea turtles, the hawksbill sea turtle (Eretmochelys imbricata) and the green sea turtle (Chelonia mydas). There are no listed endangered species of fauna or flora in upland Cayo Norte.
