= Caribbean Islands National Wildlife Refuge Complex =

Unit of the United States Fish and Wildlife Service

Caribbean Islands National Wildlife Complex is an administrative unit of the United States Fish and Wildlife Service which oversees National Wildlife Refuges in Puerto Rico, the U.S. Virgin Islands, and Navassa Island of the U.S. Minor Outlying Islands. The NWR complex also reintroduces the critically endangered Puerto Rican parrot into the wild.

== Components ==
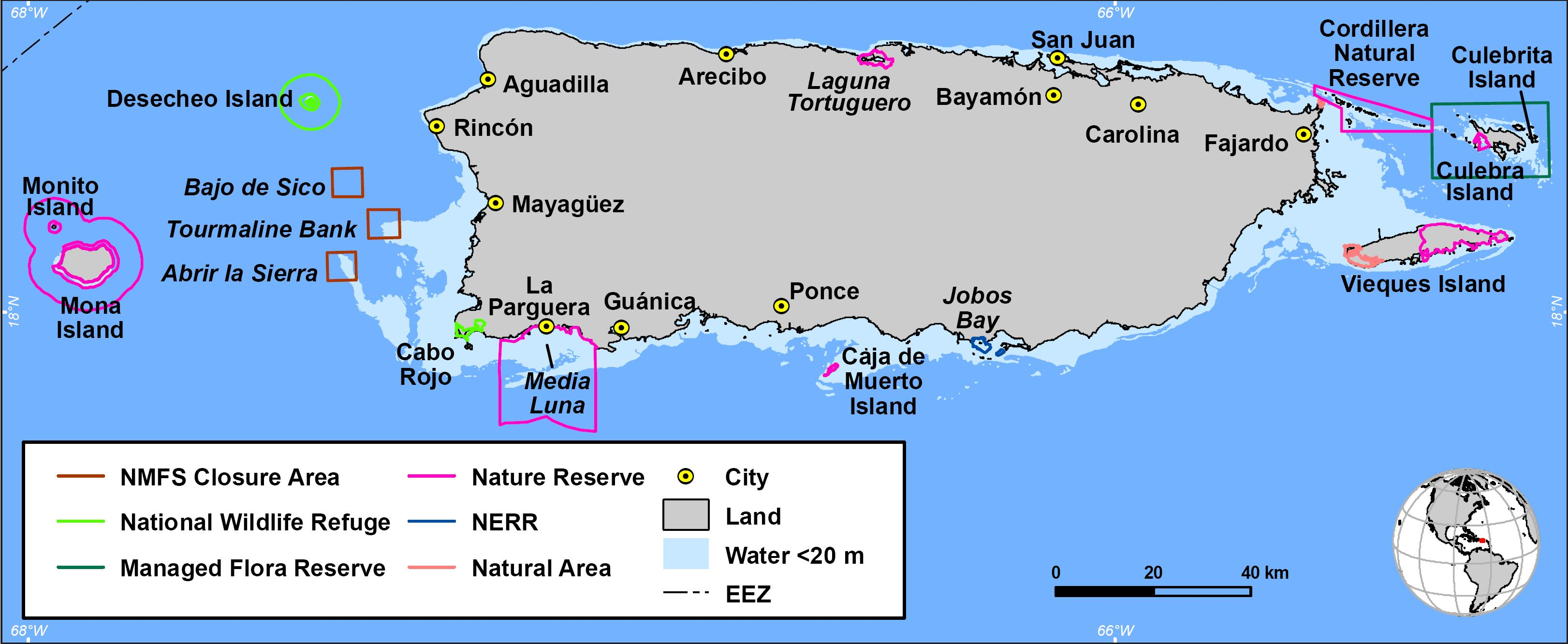

=== Puerto Rico ===
- Cabo Rojo National Wildlife Refuge
- Culebra National Wildlife Refuge
- Desecheo National Wildlife Refuge
- Laguna Cartagena National Wildlife Refuge
- Vieques National Wildlife Refuge

=== U.S. Minor Outlying Islands ===
- Navassa Island National Wildlife Refuge

=== U.S. Virgin Islands ===
- Buck Island National Wildlife Refuge
- Green Cay National Wildlife Refuge
- Sandy Point National Wildlife Refuge

== Caribbean Ecological Services Field Office ==
The Caribbean Ecological Services Field Office was established in 1974 as part of the U.S. Fish and Wildlife Service's Southeast Region (Region 4). This organization within the Caribbean Islands National Wildlife Refuge Complex has jurisdiction over Federal Trust Species (federally listed endangered species, including migratory birds and inter-jurisdictional fish populations) and Strategic Habitat Conservation programs. The field office is based in Cabo Rojo, Puerto Rico, and although the office is not open to the general public it also hosts the Cabo Rojo National Wildlife Refuge Visitor Center.

== Gallery ==
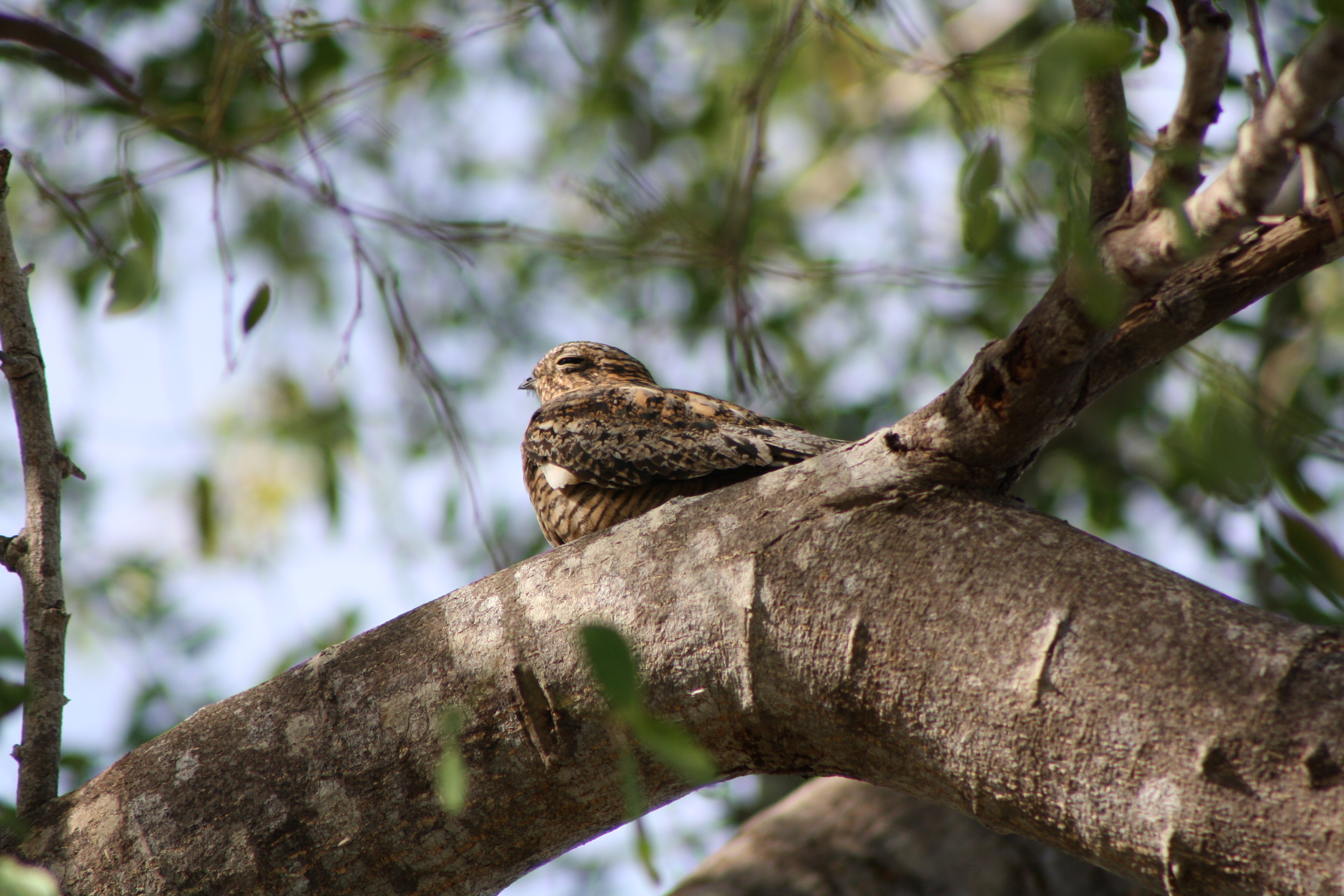
Antillean nighthawk (Chordeiles gundlachii), Cabo Rojo NWR.

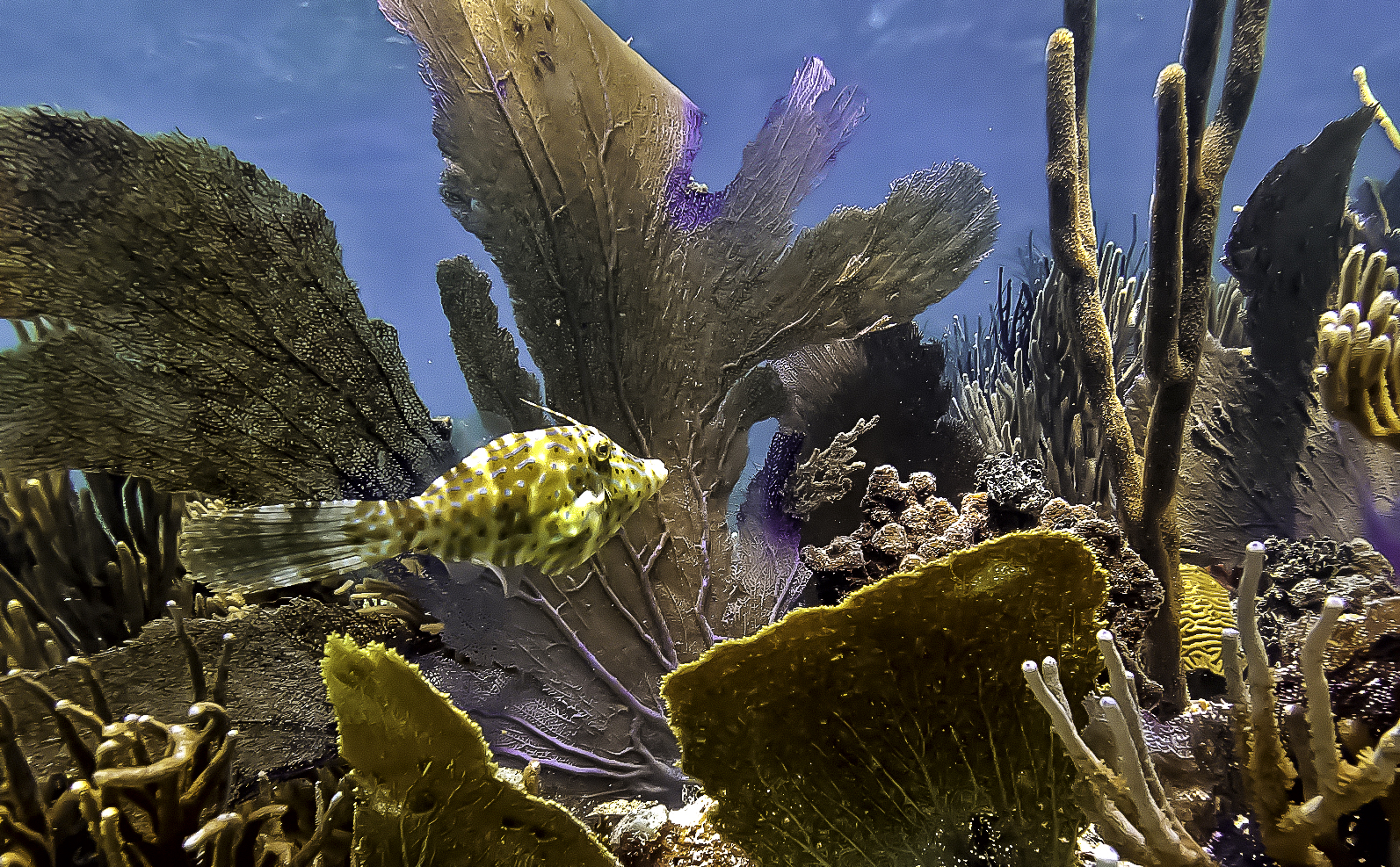
Coral reef and trunkfish. Culebra NWR.

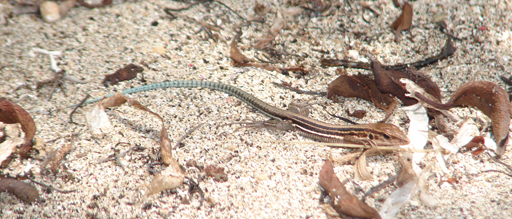
Ground lizard. Green Cay NWR.

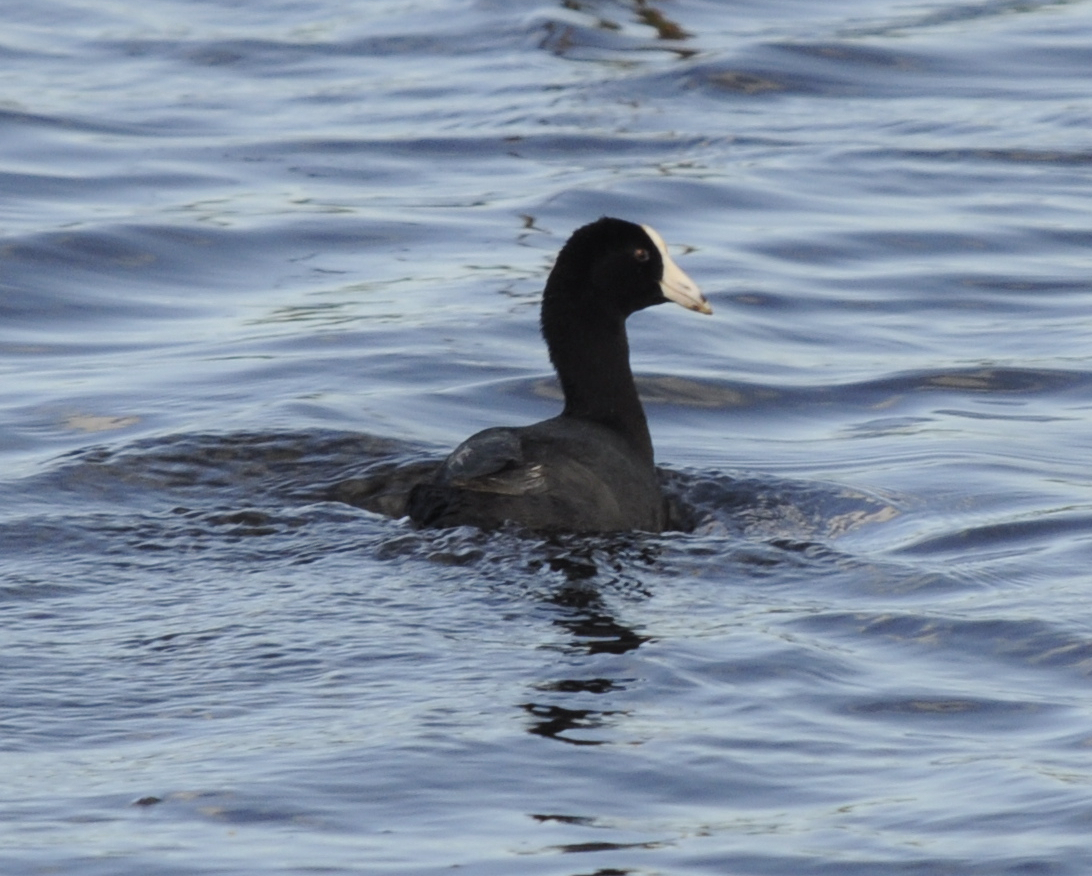
American coot (Fulica americana). Laguna Cartagena NWR.

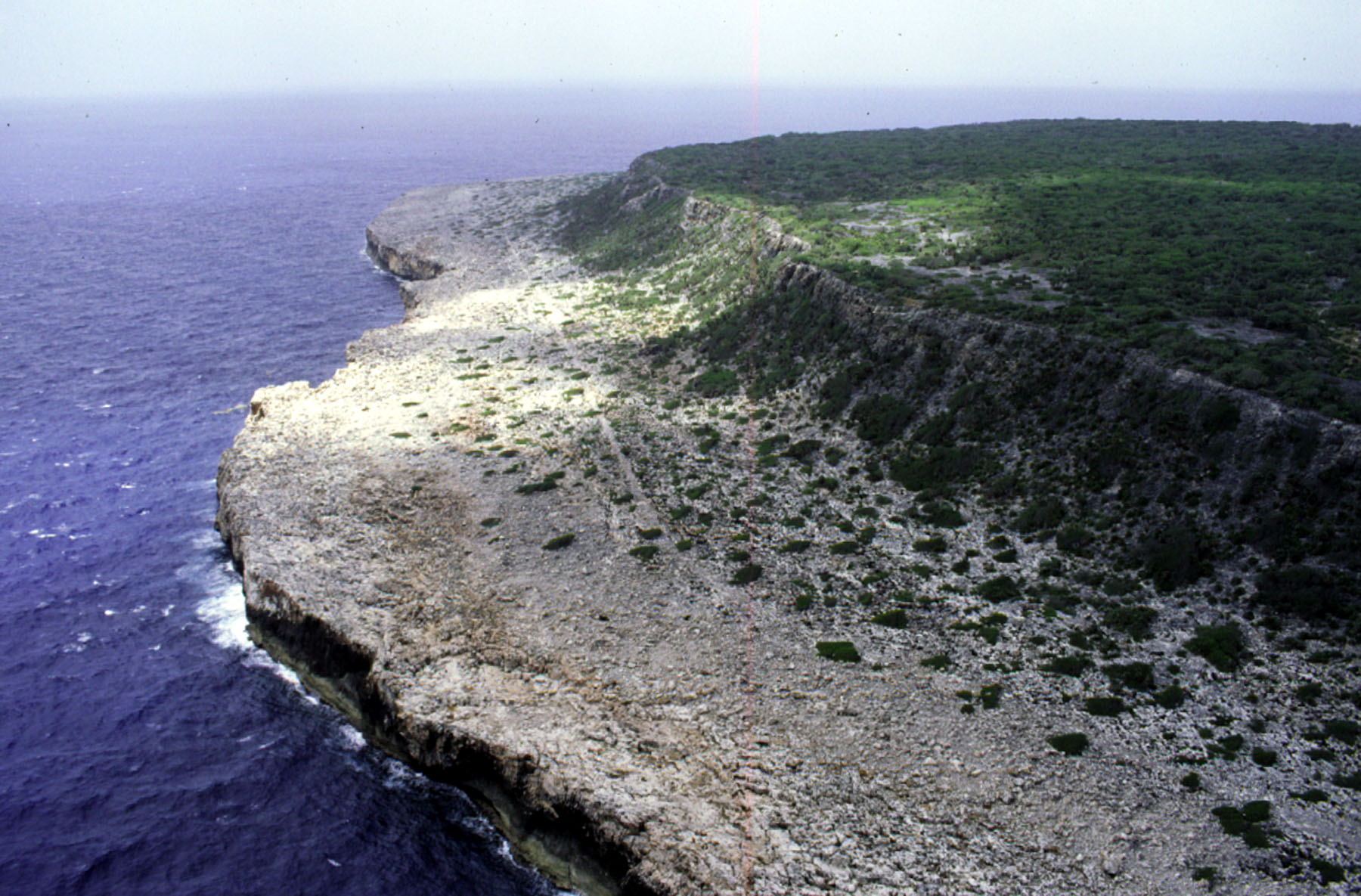
Aerial view. Navassa Island NWR.

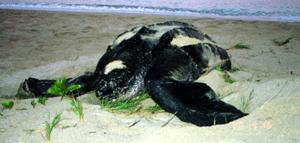
Leatherback sea turtle. Sandy Point NWR.

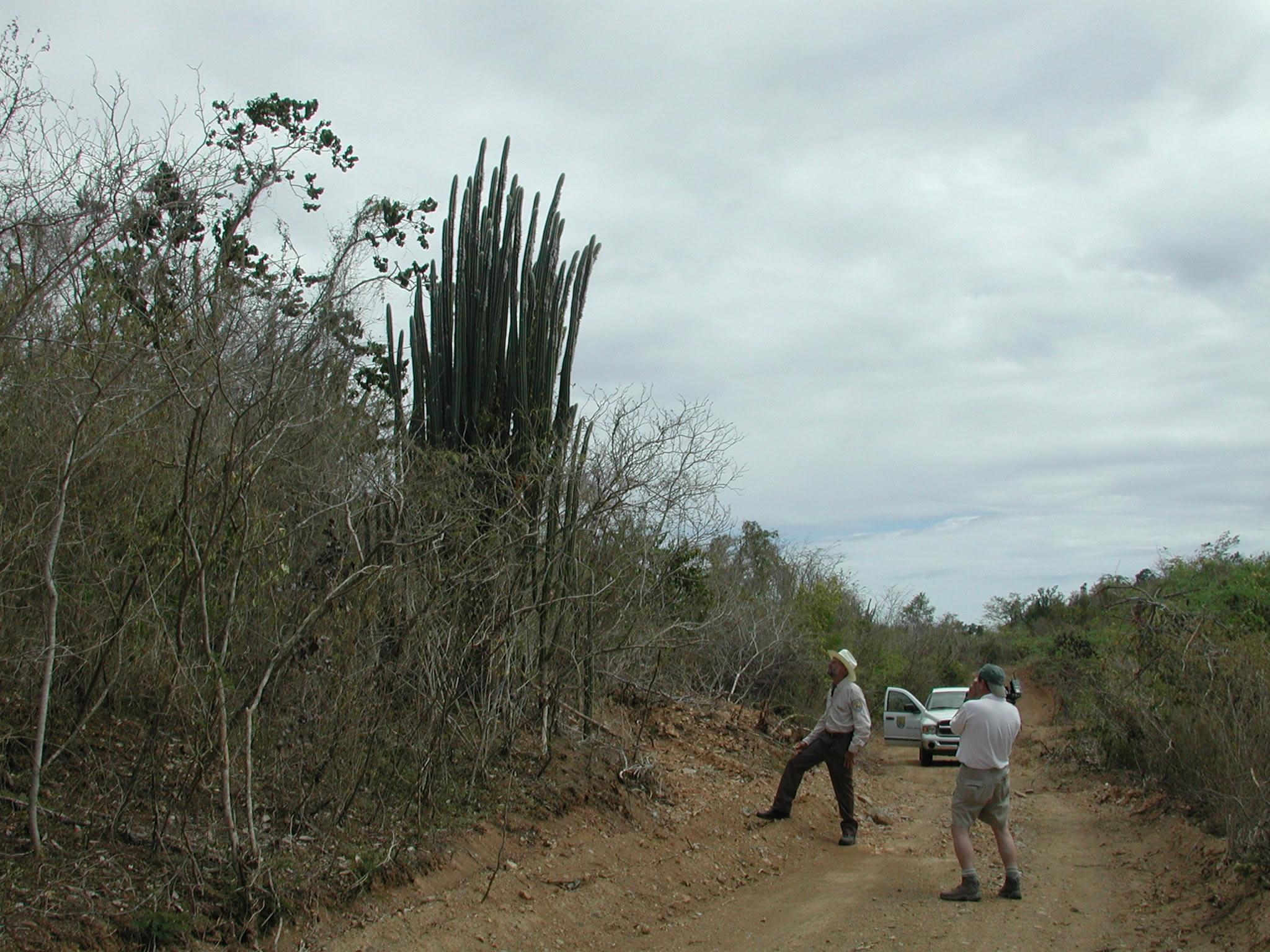
Sub-tropical dry forest. Vieques NWR.

== See also ==
- List of National Wildlife Refuges of the United States
