= San Isidro, Culebra, Puerto Rico =

Barrio of Puerto Rico

San Isidro
- Barrio
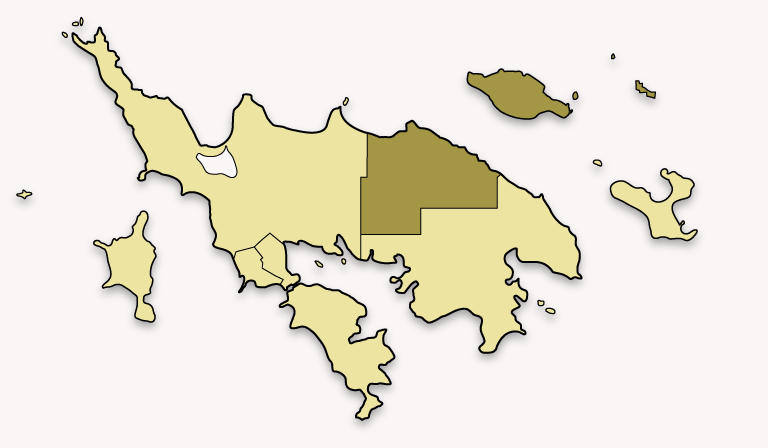
- Map of Culebra highlighting San Isidro

- Location within Puerto Rico
- Coordinates: 18°20′51″N 65°14′12″W
- Commonwealth: Puerto Rico
- Municipality: Culebra

Area
  - Total: 25.62 sq mi (66.4 km^{2})
  - Land: 2.26 sq mi (5.9 km^{2})
  - Water: 23.36 sq mi (60.5 km^{2})
- Elevation: 0 ft (0 m)

Population (2010)
  - Total: 16
  - Density: 7.1/sq mi (2.7/km^{2})
- Source: 2010 Census
- Time zone: UTC−4 (AST)
- ZIP Code: 00775

San Isidro is a barrio in the island-municipality of Culebra, Puerto Rico. Its population in 2010 was 16.

It consists of a part of the island of Culebra in the northeast, and of islands and islets such as Roca Speck, Cayo Norte, Cayo Sombrerito, Cayos Geniquí, Cayo Tiburón, and Cayo Ballena.

Historical population
Census	Pop.	Note	%±
1930	116		—
1940	75		−35.3%
1950	37		−50.7%
1960	7		−81.1%
1970	12		71.4%
1980	8		−33.3%
1990	18		125.0%
2000	22		22.2%
2010	16		−27.3%
U.S. Decennial Census; 1899 (shown as 1900) 1910-1930; 1930-1950 1980-2000 2010

== See also ==
- List of communities in Puerto Rico
- List of barrios and sectors of Culebra, Puerto Rico
