= Cayo Luis Peña =

Uninhabited island in Puerto Rico

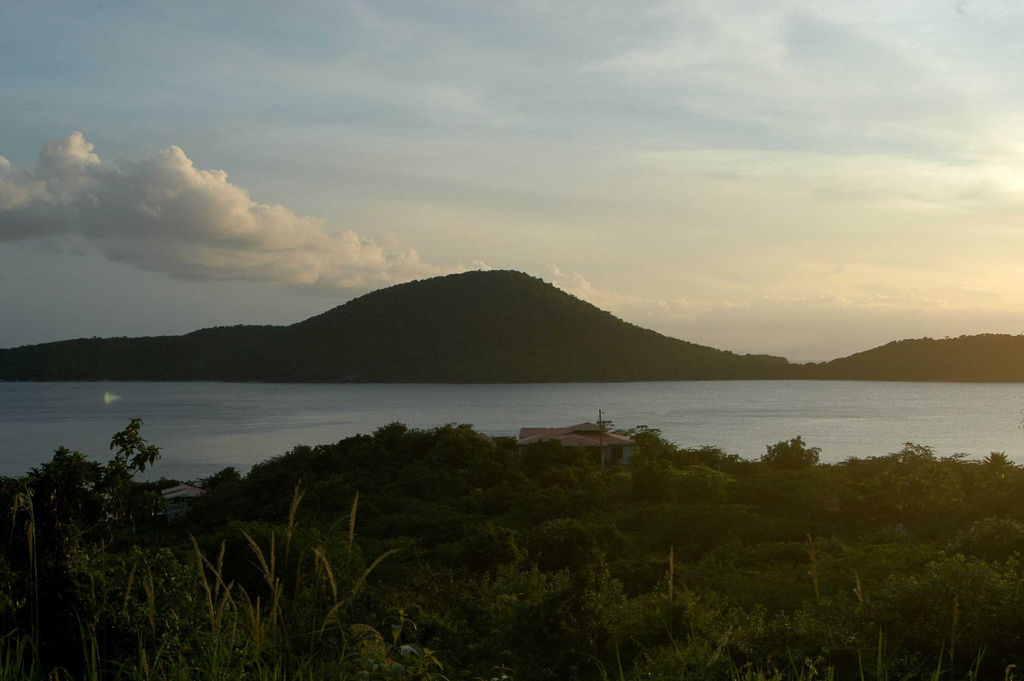
- Cayo Luis Peña

- Location within Puerto Rico Location within Lesser Antilles Location within the Caribbean

Geography
- Location: Caribbean Sea
- Coordinates: 18°18′20.89″N 65°19′57.37″W
- Archipelago: Puerto Rico Archipelago

Administration
- United States; Puerto Rico
- Territory: Puerto Rico
- Municipality: Culebra
- Barrio/Ward: Flamenco

Additional information
- Nature Reserve (Culebra National Wildlife Refuge)

Cayo Luis Peña, formerly South West Key, is a small uninhabited island off the west coast of Culebra, an island municipality of Puerto Rico. The island is a nature reserve which forms part of the Culebra National Wildlife Refuge. Visitors are allowed on the island for nature walks, snorkeling, and swimming; however, visitors are not allowed to stay on the island overnight. The island is only accessible via private water taxis. This limited access results in relatively few visitors and the island and surrounding reefs are able to stay more pristine as a result. The small number of visitors also makes the island more private for those willing to make the journey. Luis Peña Beach is located on the north side of the island. The island is named after its second owner.
