= Culebra National Wildlife Refuge =

National wildlife refuge in the Puerto Rico archipelago

- IUCN category IV (habitat/species management area)
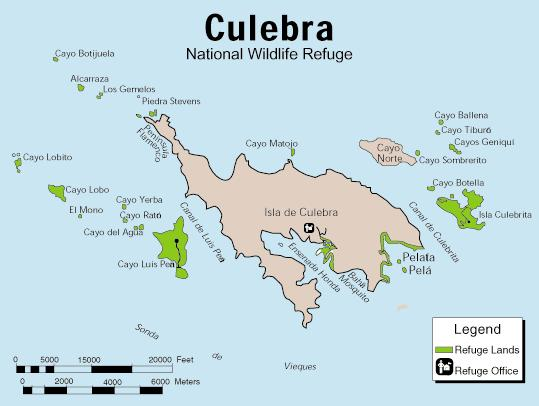

- Location within Puerto Rico
- Location: Puerto Rico, Caribbean
- Nearest city: Culebra, Puerto Rico
- Coordinates: 18.3382888°N 65.2579344°W
- Area: 5.86 km^{2} (1,450 acres)
- Established: 1909
- Governing body: U.S. Fish and Wildlife Service
- Website: Culebra National Wildlife Refuge

Culebra National Wildlife Refuge (Spanish: Refugio nacional de vida silvestre de Culebra) is a National Wildlife Refuge (NWR) located in and around the island municipality of Culebra in Puerto Rico. It is the site of the former Camp Roosevelt military base.

The refuge was established with the intended purpose of protecting one of the most critical and significant nesting sites of seabirds in the West Indies.

== Management ==
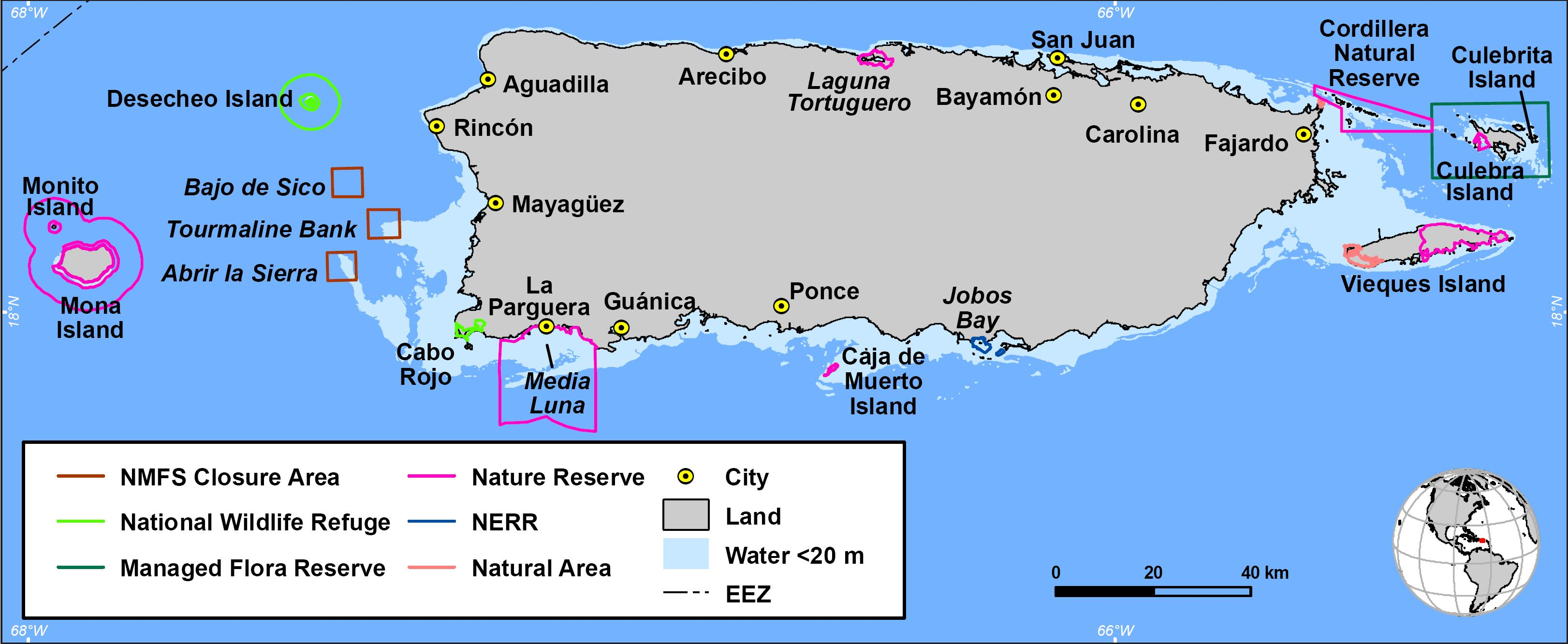
Coral reef ecosystem of Puerto Rico

Formerly a property of the United States Navy and site of the former Camp Roosevelt military base and naval station, Culebra National Wildlife Refuge is administered today as a unit of the Caribbean Islands National Wildlife Refuge Complex, which in turn is managed federally by the United States Fish and Wildlife Service.

With the exception of the privately owned Key Norte, all minor islands and keys surrounding Culebra are also managed as part of the national wildlife refuge. Additionally, the forested areas around Monte Resaca, the highest point in Culebra, are jointly managed with the Puerto Rico Department of Natural Resources (Departamento de Recursos Naturales y Ambientales de Puerto Rico, DRNA). The maritime waters surrounding some of the refuge keys, such as Luis Peña Cay for example, are managed however by the DRNA as part of the Luis Peña Channel Nature Reserve.

=== Special designations ===
The refuge has two Critical Habitat designations: one maritime and coastal, designated to protect the habitat and nesting sites of green sea turtles (Chelonia mydas) and hawksbill sea turtles (Eretmochelys imbricata), and one terrestrial, designated to protect the habitat of the Culebra skink (Spondylurus culebrae) and the Culebra giant anole (Anolis roosevelti). The refuge was also proclaimed an Important Bird Area (IBA) by BirdLife International in 2007.

Within the cultural and historic heritage domain, the Culebrita Lighthouse, located within the boundaries of the refuge, was added to the United States National Register of Historic Places in 1981 and to the Puerto Rico Register of Historic Sites and Zones in 2001.

== History ==
Portions of the island of Culebra were first designated a wildlife reserve in 1909 in accordance with Executive Order 1042 proclaimed by then President Theodore Roosevelt. At the time, Culebra was administered by the United States Navy, and several areas had been used for gunnery and bombing practice by the Navy and the Marine Corps from the Second World War until 1976. Portions of the Navy-administered lands were returned to the Puerto Rican government in 1977 while jurisdiction over the rest of the zone was passed to the United States Fish and Wildlife Service. On-site administration of the refuge was established in 1983.

== Geography ==
The wildlife refuge covers an area of 1,450 acres (5.86 square kilometers) or one quarter of the municipality of Culebra, protecting all of its outlying islands and keys (with the exception of the privately owned Key Norte), and the wetlands and mangroves found in Ensenada Honda and Puerto del Manglar in southeast Culebra. The largest surface area fully managed under the NWR consists primarily of all these outlying islands and keys, with Luis Peña (342 acres) and Culebrita (266 acres) being the two largest.

Mount Resaca, the highest point in both the refuge and the island of Culebra, reaches an elevation of 623 feet (190 meters) above sea level.

== Ecology ==
The ecology of the Culebra NWR is diverse, varying from coral reefs and shoreline habitats to mangrove and coastal strand forests.

=== Wildlife ===
As an Important Bird Area, more than 50,000 seabirds of 13 species breed and nurture their young at the refuge annually, with the largest sooty tern nesting in the Culebra archipelago being found on the Flamenco Peninsula. Luis Peña Cay is one of the three critical nesting sites of white-tailed tropicbird (Phaethon lepturus) in Puerto Rico, the other two being in Mona Island and the limestone cliffs of Guajataca in Quebradillas.

At least three species of sea turtles, including leatherback and hawksbill, use the waters surrounding Culebra and nest on refuge beaches. Another notable species found within the wildlife refuge is the Culebra giant anole (Anolis roosevelti), an extremely rare and possibly extinct anole species that grows six inches long.

== Visiting ==
The refuge locations located within the main island of Culebra are open to visitors year-round from 6:00 AM to 6:00 PM. Visiting the keys that form part of the refuge is often done via private vessels or through organized tours. As an IBA and a part of the regional Caribbean Birding Trail, the refuge is also attractive for birdwatching and wildlife photography.

== Gallery ==
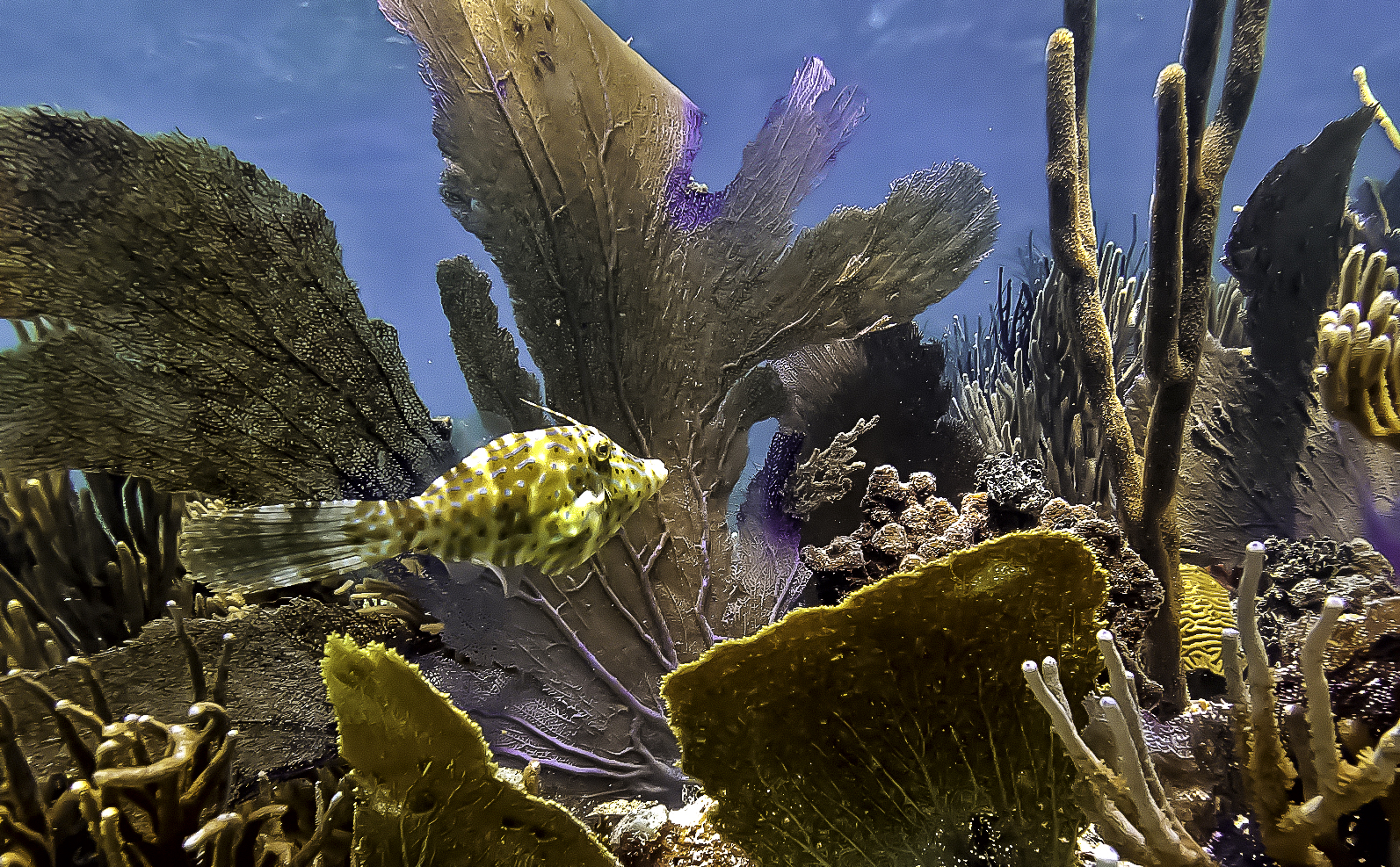

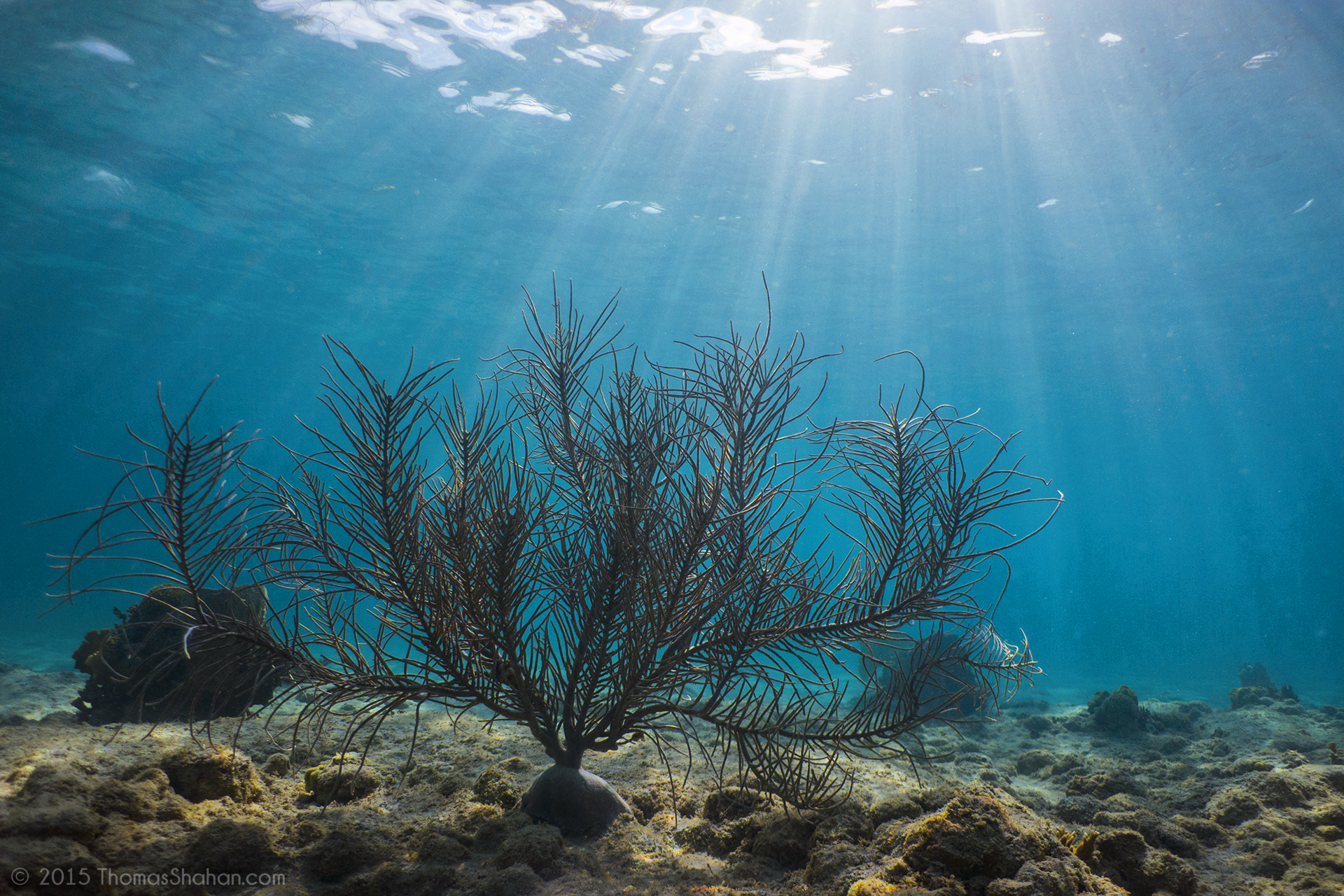

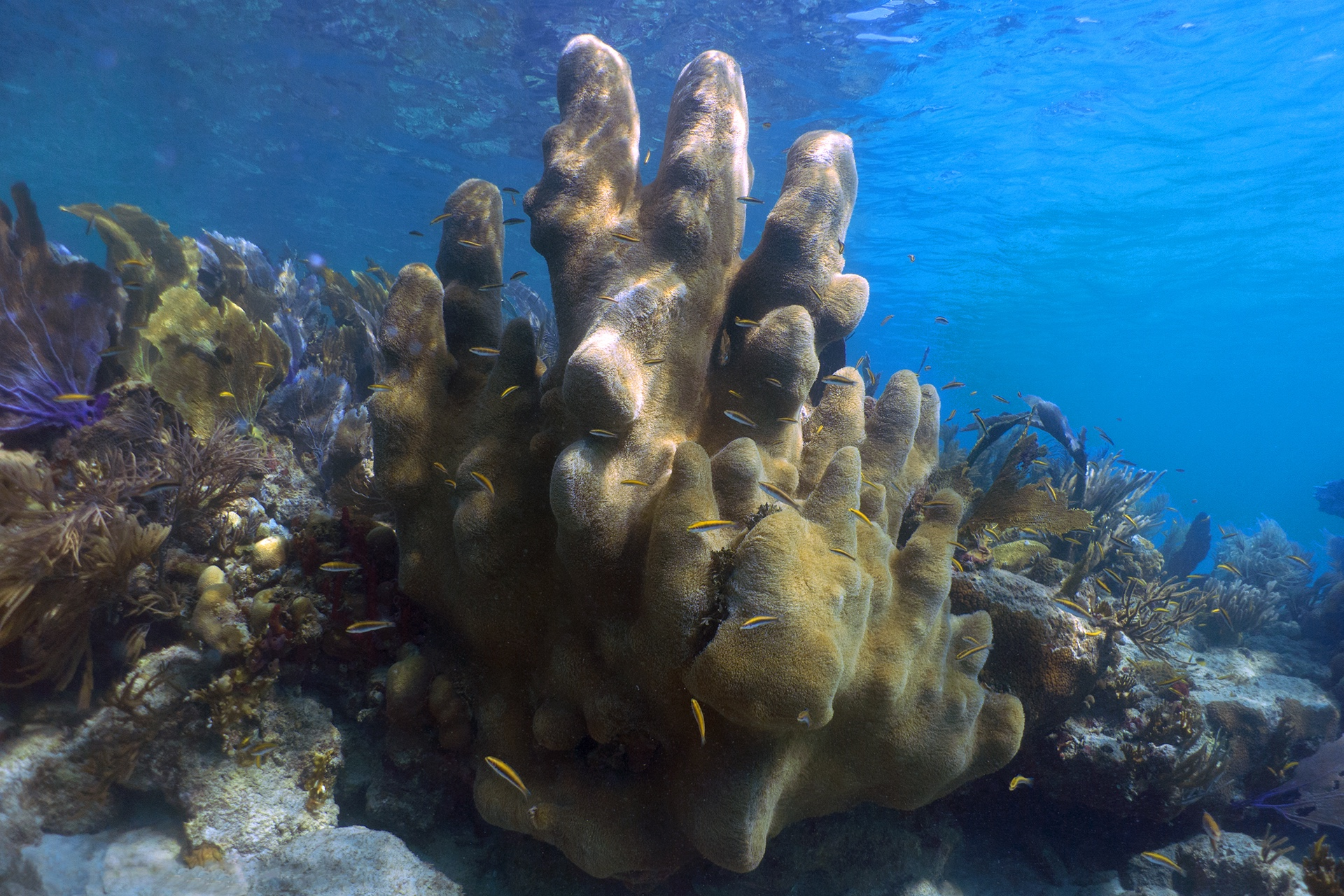

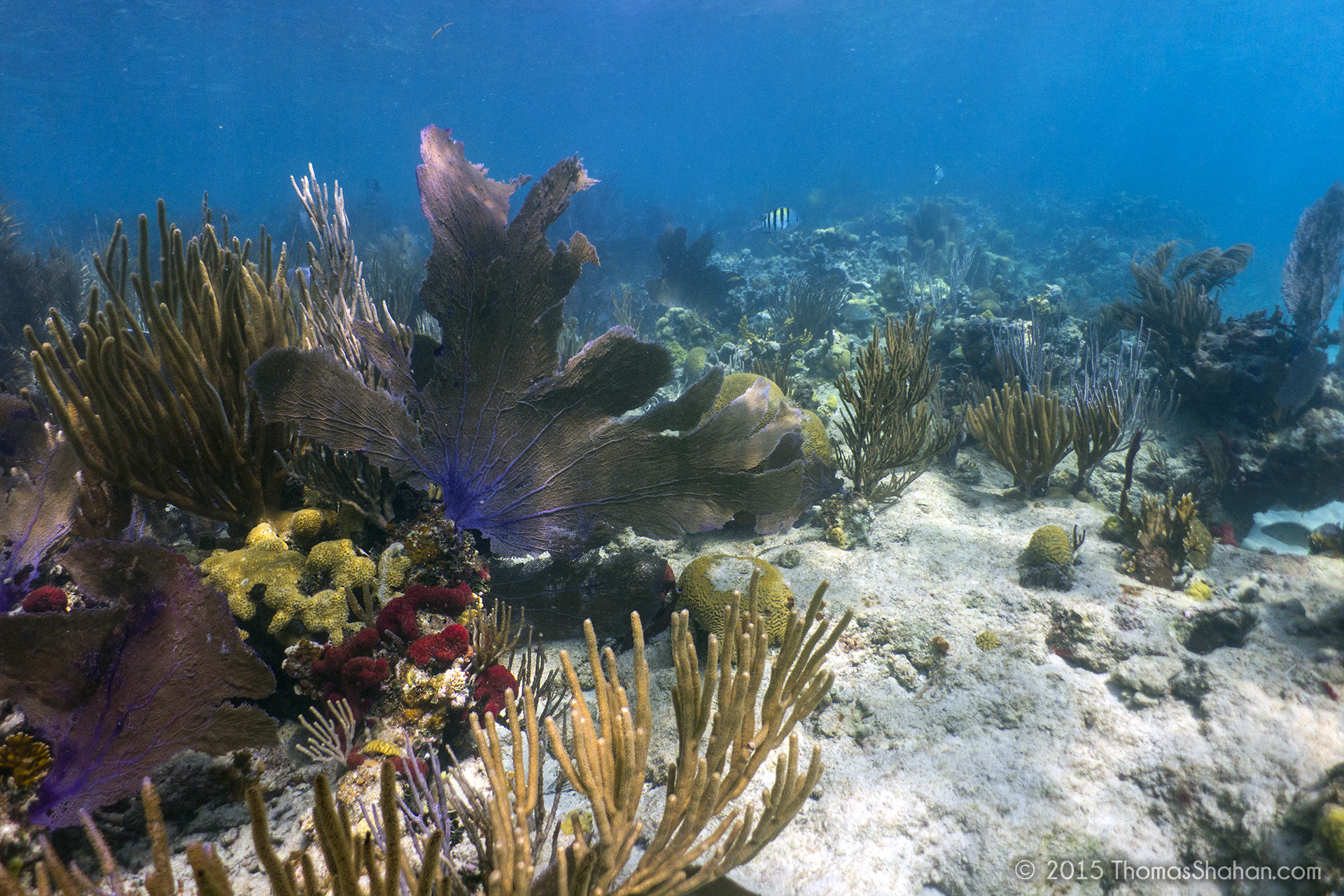

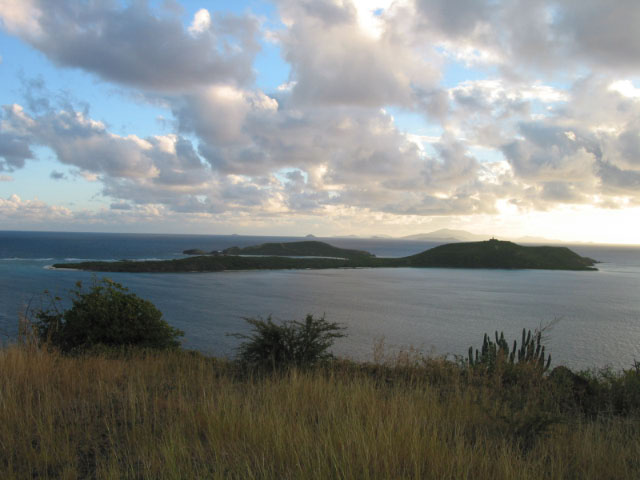

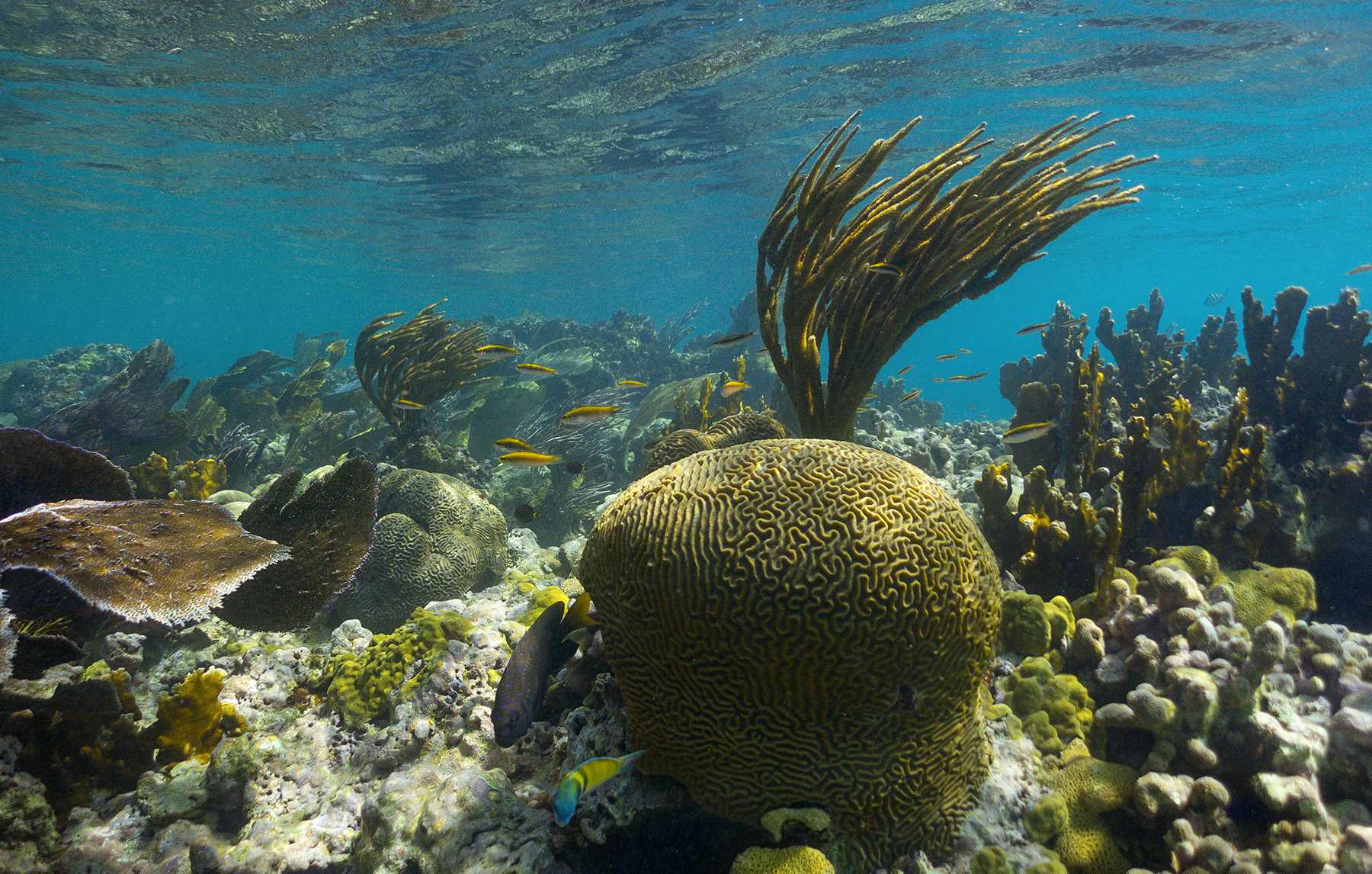

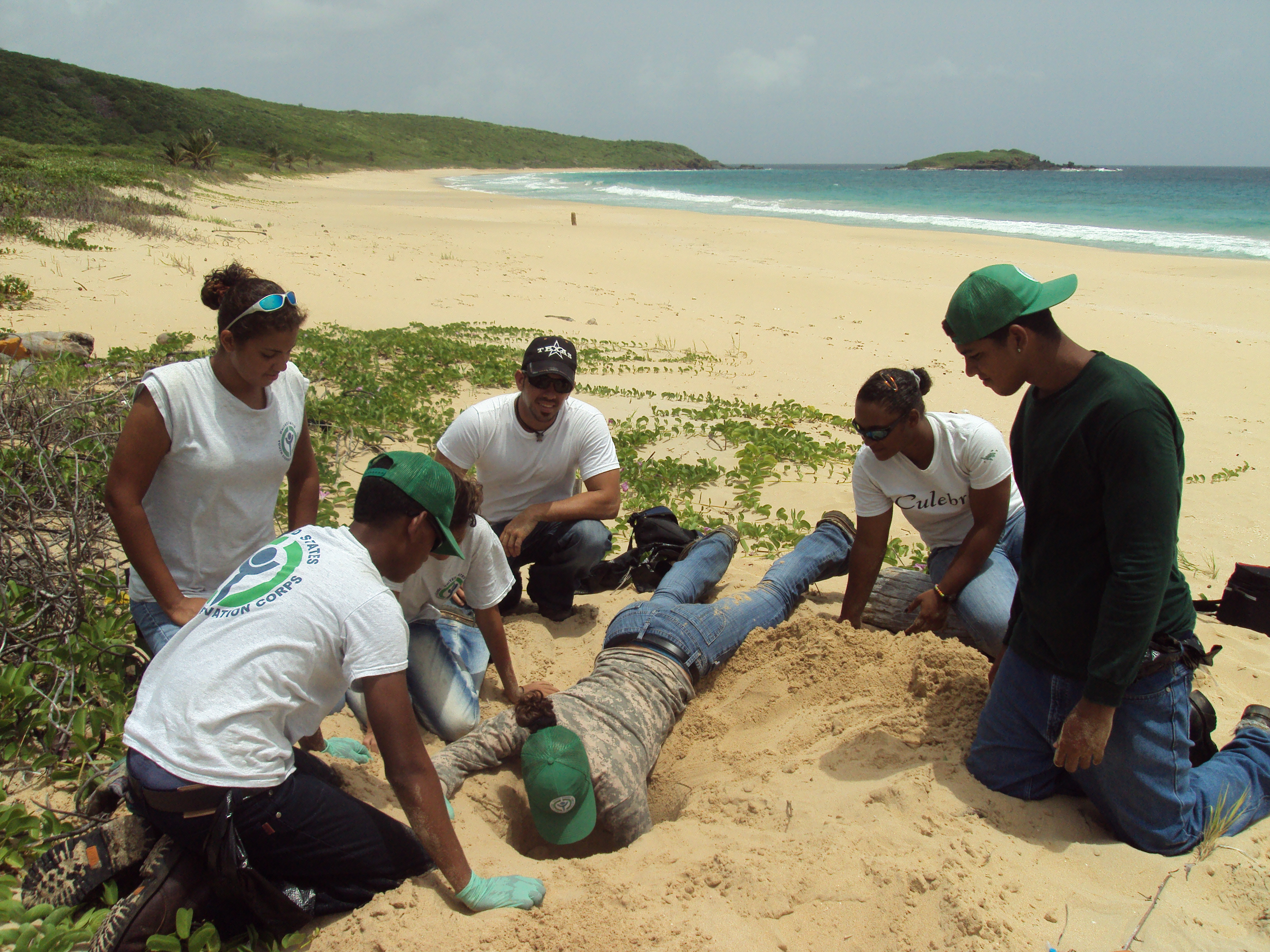
Volunteers relocating sea turtle nests at Culebra NWR.

== See also ==
- Caribbean Islands National Wildlife Refuge Complex in Puerto Rico
  - Cabo Rojo National Wildlife Refuge
  - Desecheo National Wildlife Refuge
  - Laguna Cartagena National Wildlife Refuge
  - Vieques National Wildlife Refuge
