= Puerto Rico Highway 253 =

Highway in Puerto Rico

Highway 253
- Ruta 253

Route information
- Maintained by Puerto Rico DTPW
- Length: 2.8 km (1.7 mi)

Major junctions
- South end: Calle Punta Soldado in Playa Sardinas II
- North end: PR-250 in Culebra barrio-pueblo

Location
- Country: United States
- Territory: Puerto Rico
- Municipalities: Culebra

Highway system
- Roads in Puerto Rico; List
← PR-252	→ PR-301

Puerto Rico Highway 253 (PR-253) is a tertiary route located in Culebra, Puerto Rico. It goes from the PR-250 on the drawbridge over the Ensenada Canal and runs east, Playa Sardinas II, towards Fulladosa and Punta Aloe. It extends approximately 3.2 km to the access road to Punta del Soldado.

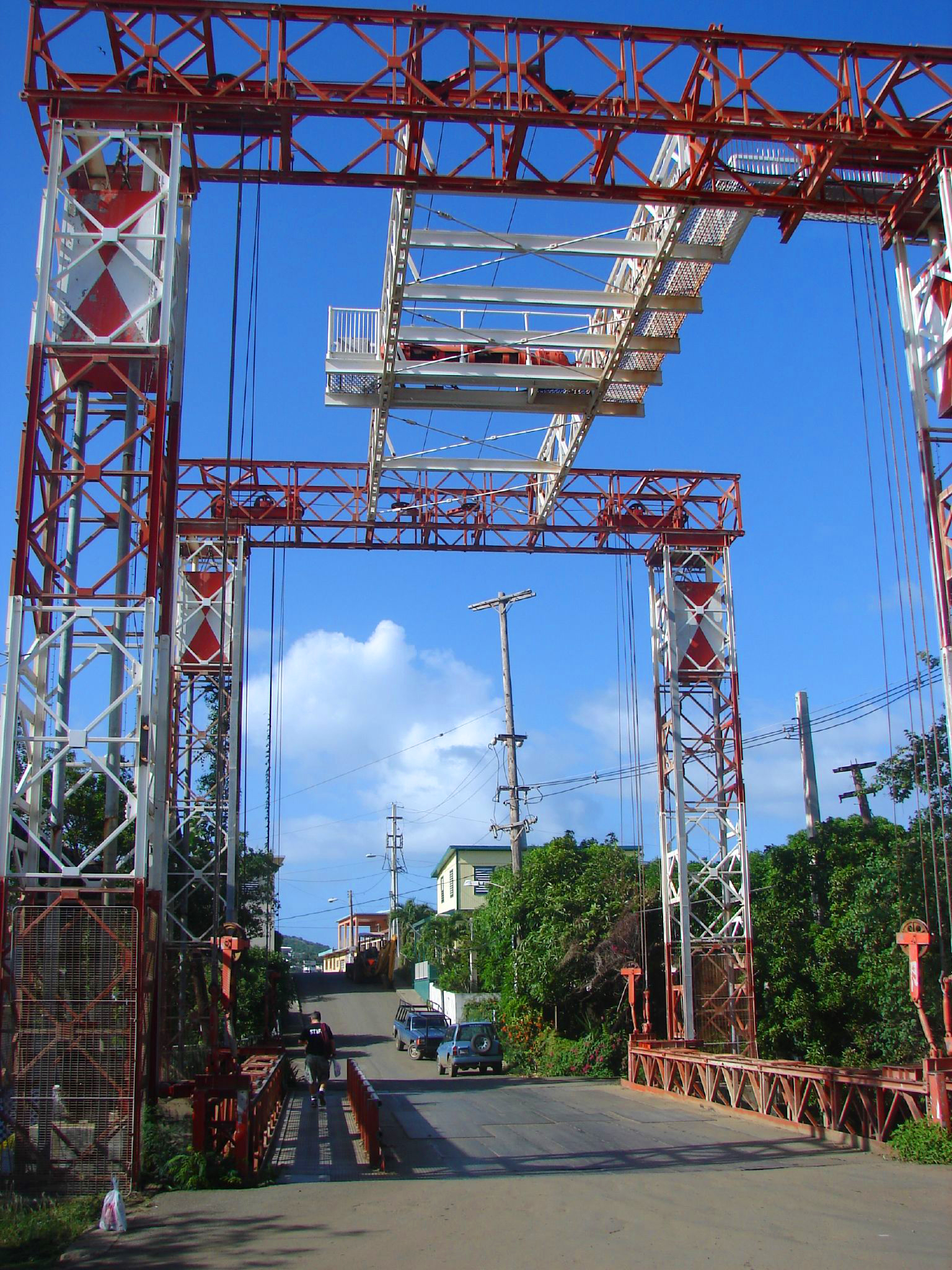
Drawbridge at the northern terminus of PR-253

== Major intersections ==
The entire route is located in Culebra.

Location	km	mi	Destinations	Notes
Playa Sardinas II	2.8	1.7	PR-Calle Punta Soldado – Playa Sardinas II	Southern terminus of PR-253
Culebra barrio-pueblo	0.0	0.0	PR-250 – Culebra	Northern terminus of PR-253
1.000 mi = 1.609 km; 1.000 km = 0.621 mi
