= Puerto Rico Highway 250 =

Highway in Puerto Rico

Highway 250
- Ruta 250

Route information
- Maintained by Puerto Rico DTPW
- Length: 9.0 km (5.6 mi)

Major junctions
- West end: Port of Culebra in Playa Sardinas I
- PR-252 in Playa Sardinas I–Culebra barrio-pueblo; PR-253 in Culebra barrio-pueblo; PR-251 in Culebra barrio-pueblo
- East end: Zoni Beach in Fraile

Location
- Country: United States
- Territory: Puerto Rico
- Municipalities: Culebra

Highway system
- Roads in Puerto Rico; List
← PR-239	→ PR-251

Puerto Rico Highway 250 (PR-250) is the main and longest highway located in Culebra, Puerto Rico. This road extends from the Port of Culebra to Zoni Beach.

== Route description ==
Formerly known as PR-998, it runs from the Port of Culebra (pier) near the Dewey town square in a northerly direction until it intersects with the PR-251 in the Clark Community in front of Benjamín Rivera Noriega Airport. From this point, it extends to the east, bordering the north side of Ensenada Honda, reaching the Zoni Beach. This road has direct access to the Sardinas, Mosquito, Larga and Tórtolos beaches in the Flamenco neighborhood.

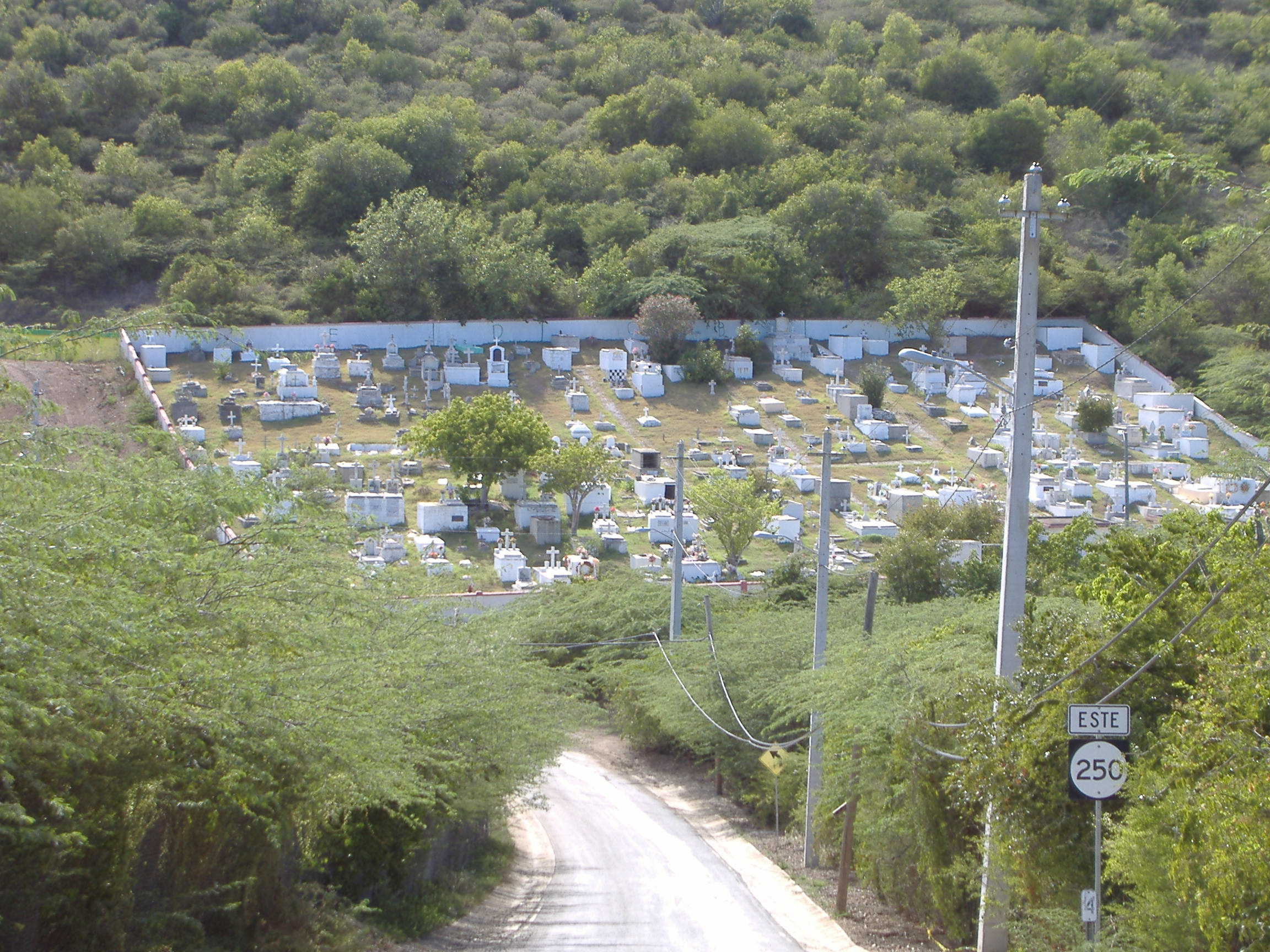
PR-250 east near the municipal cemetery in Fraile

== Major intersections ==
The entire route is located in Culebra.

Location	km	mi	Destinations	Notes
Playa Sardinas I	0.0	0.0	Western terminus of PR-250 at the Port of Culebra	
Playa Sardinas I–Culebra barrio-pueblo line	0.1– 0.2	0.062– 0.12	PR-252 – Playa Sardinas I	
Culebra barrio-pueblo	0.3	0.19	PR-253 (Calle Escudero) – Playa Sardinas II	
Culebra barrio-pueblo	1.3	0.81	PR-251 (Avenida Hermanos Ávila Esperanza) – Flamenco	
Fraile	9.0	5.6	Eastern terminus of PR-250 at Zoni Beach; dead end road	
1.000 mi = 1.609 km; 1.000 km = 0.621 mi
