= Puerto Rico Highway 252 =

Highway in Puerto Rico

Highway 252
- Ruta 252

Route information
- Maintained by Puerto Rico DTPW
- Length: 1.5 km (0.93 mi)

Major junctions
- South end: PR-250 in Playa Sardinas I–Culebra barrio-pueblo
- North end: Barrio Flamenco

Location
- Country: United States
- Territory: Puerto Rico
- Municipalities: Culebra

Highway system
- Roads in Puerto Rico; List
← PR-251	→ PR-253

Puerto Rico Highway 252 (PR-252) is a tertiary route located in Culebra, Puerto Rico. It goes from the PR-250 in the Port of Culebra (pier) near the town square and runs northwest until you reach the municipal roads that lead to Quintas de Culebra and Melones Beach.

== Major intersections ==
The entire route is located in Culebra.

Location	km	mi	Destinations	Notes
Playa Sardinas I–Culebra barrio-pueblo line	0.0	0.0	PR-250 (Calle Pedro Márquez) – Culebra	Southern terminus of PR-252
Flamenco	1.5	0.93	Northern terminus of PR-252; dead end road	
1.000 mi = 1.609 km; 1.000 km = 0.621 mi
