= Puerto Rico Highway 251 =

Highway in Puerto Rico

Highway 251
- Ruta 251
- Avenida Hermanos Ávila Esperanza

Route information
- Maintained by Puerto Rico DTPW
- Length: 2.9 km (1.8 mi)

Major junctions
- South end: PR-250 in Culebra barrio-pueblo
- North end: Flamenco Beach in Flamenco

Location
- Country: United States
- Territory: Puerto Rico
- Municipalities: Culebra

Highway system
- Roads in Puerto Rico; List
← PR-250	→ PR-252

Puerto Rico Highway 251 (PR-251) is a road located in Culebra, Puerto Rico. This highway extends from PR-250 in Culebra barrio-pueblo to Flamenco Beach.

== Route description ==
Formerly known as PR-999, this road begins in front of Benjamín Rivera Noriega Airport, at its intersection with PR-250, and runs in a northwest direction in front of the Clark and Ensenada Extension communities, reaching Flamenco Beach and Laguna Flamenco. It provides indirect access to Tamarindo Beach, Flamenco Bay and Punta Molinos in the Fraile and San Isidro neighborhoods.

PR-251 was re-named Avenida Hermanos Ávila Esperanza - These six soldiers were honored for their exceptional work in the Korean and Vietnam wars and for returning home to Puerto Rico alive. Brothers (Andrés, Pedro, Norberto, Justino, Guillermo y Tomás) - The brothers also have a street named after them in Fajardo, PR (Parcelas Beltrán).

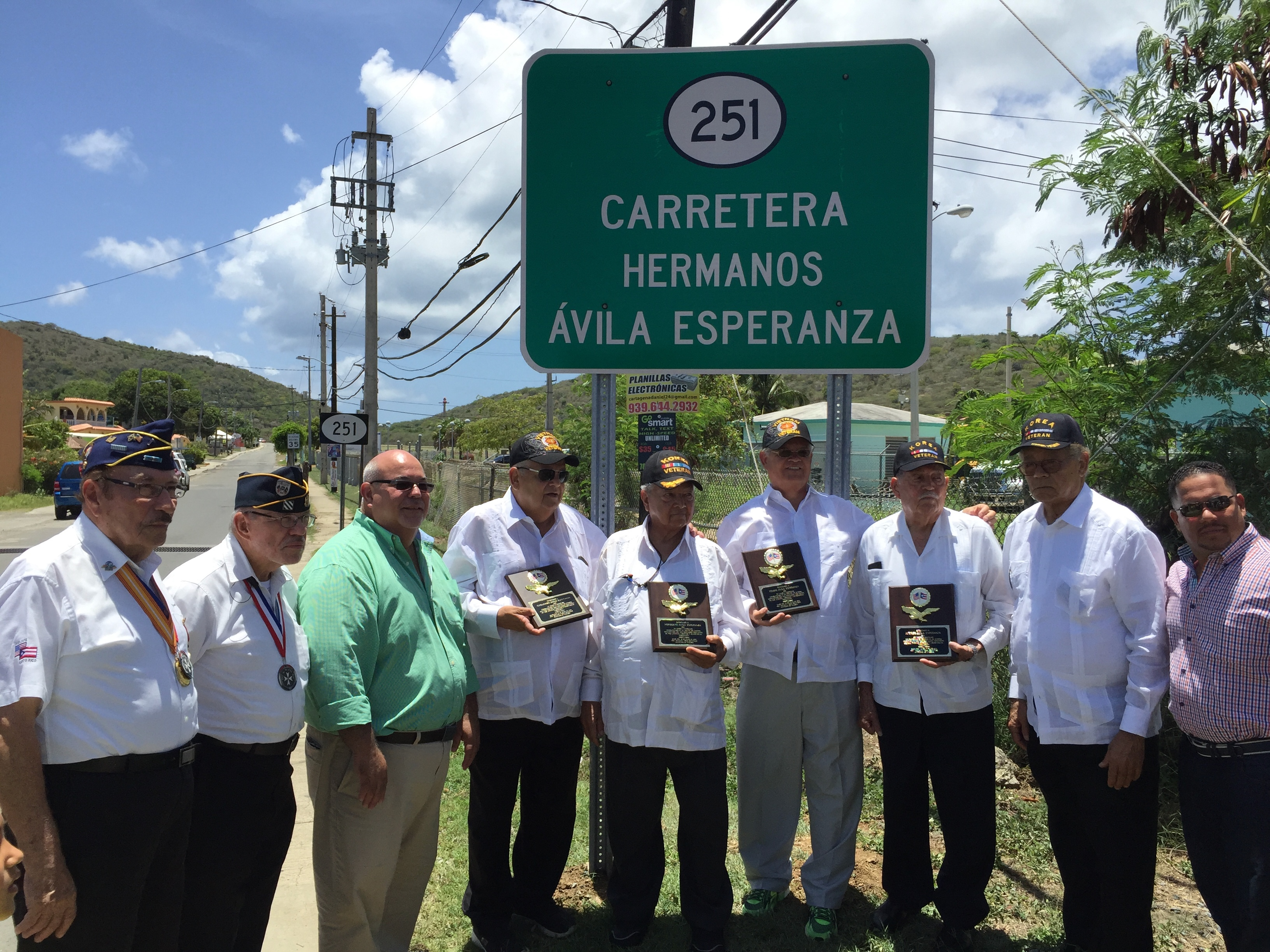
Avenida Hermanos Ávila Esperanza - Puerto Rico Highway 251

== Major intersections ==
The entire route is located in Culebra.

Location	km	mi	Destinations	Notes
Culebra barrio-pueblo	0.0	0.0	PR-250 – Culebra	Southern terminus of PR-251
Flamenco	2.9	1.8	Northern terminus of PR-251 at Flamenco Beach; dead end road	
1.000 mi = 1.609 km; 1.000 km = 0.621 mi
