= List of barrios and sectors of Culebra, Puerto Rico =

Like all municipalities of Puerto Rico, Culebra is subdivided into administrative units called barrios, which are, in contemporary times, roughly comparable to minor civil divisions, (and means wards or boroughs or neighborhoods in English). The barrios and subbarrios, in turn, are further subdivided into smaller local populated place areas/units called sectores (sectors in English). The types of sectores may vary, from normally sector to urbanización to reparto to barriada to residencial, among others. Some sectors appear in two barrios.

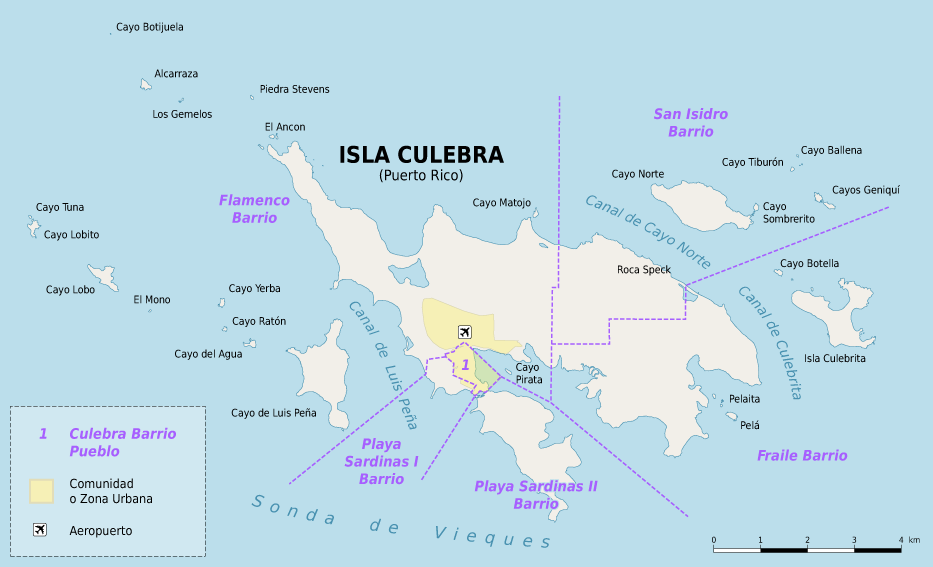
Culebra map with barrio subdivisions

== List of sectors by barrio ==
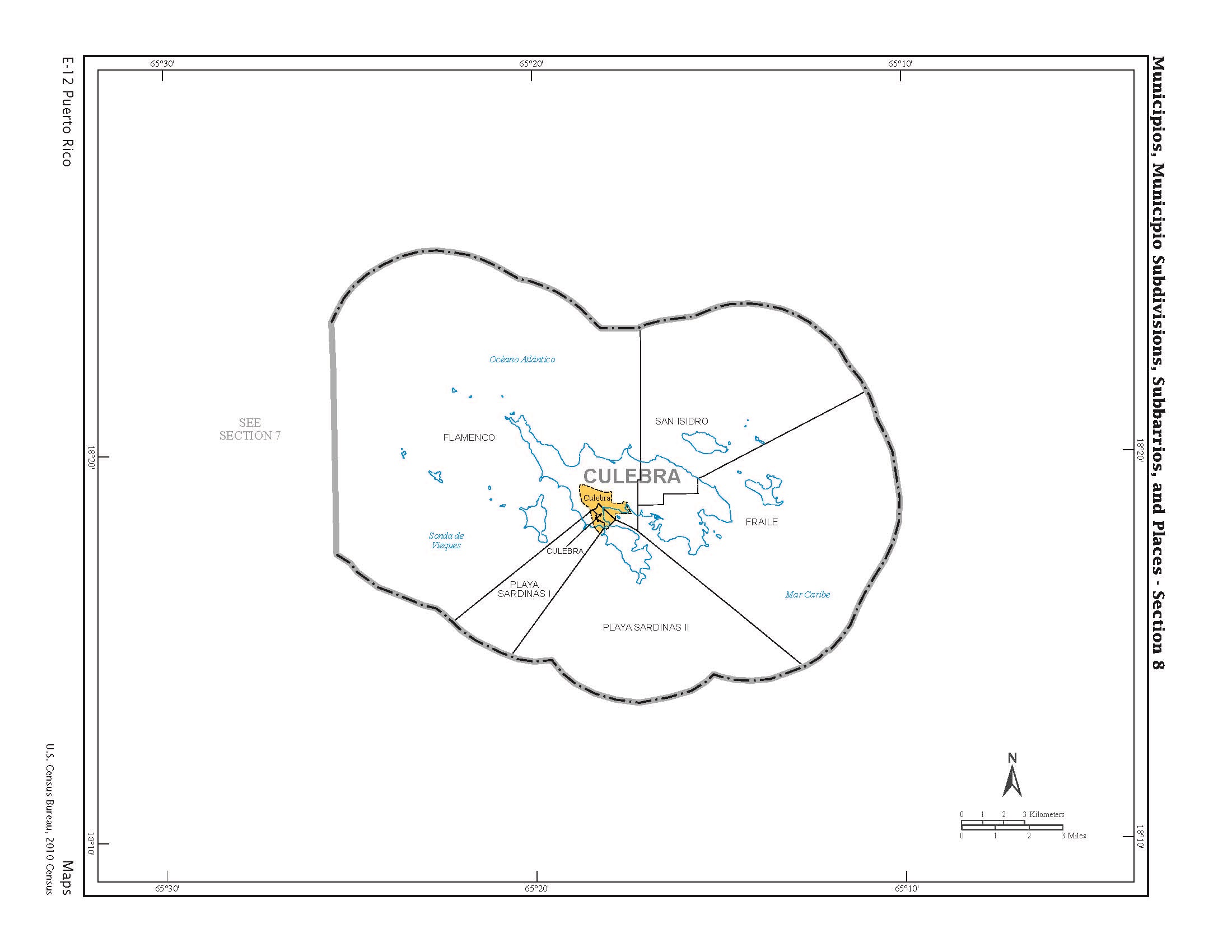
US 2010 Census map of Municipio Subdivisions, and Places of Culebra

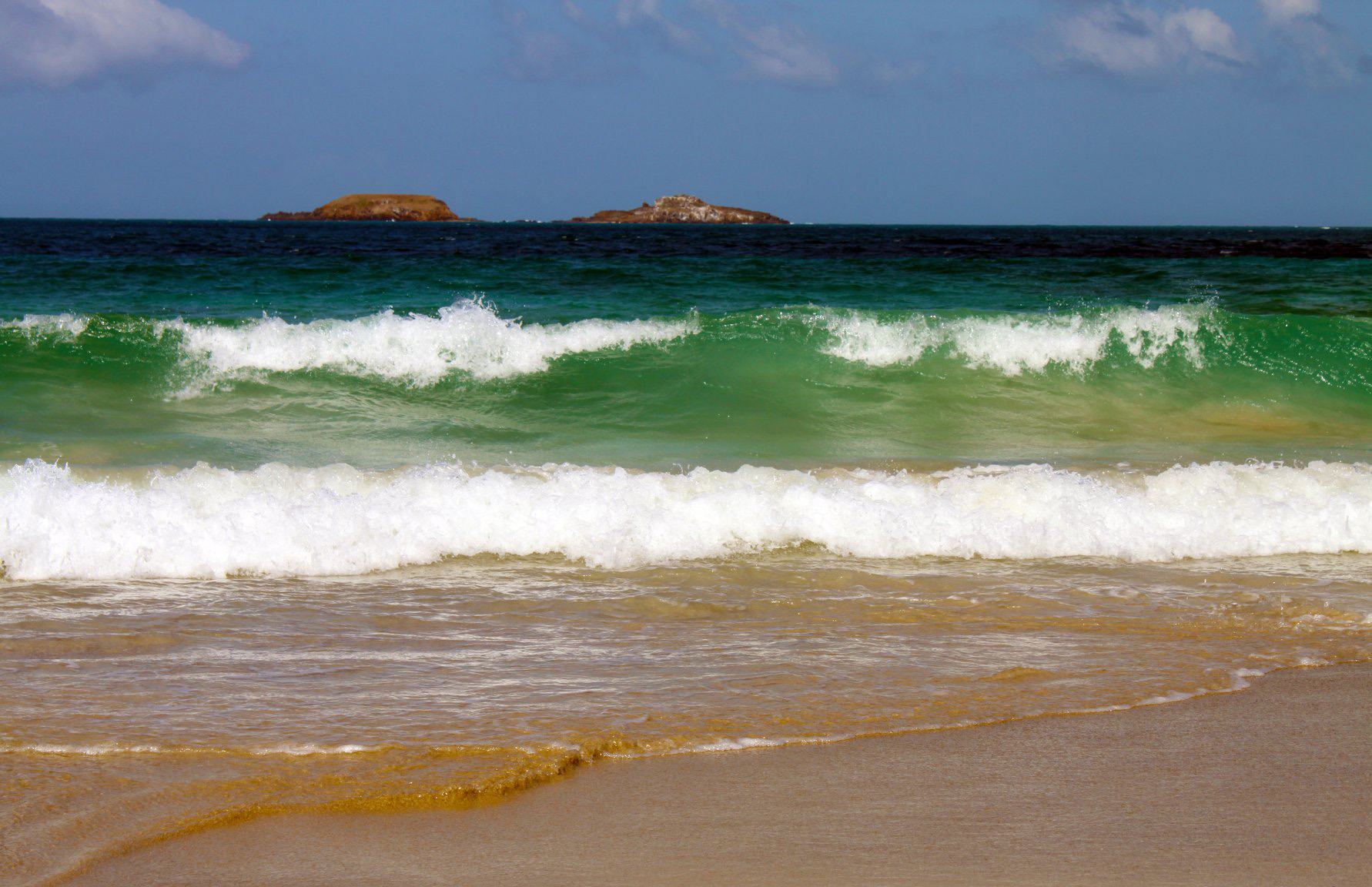
A beach in Culebra, Puerto Rico

=== Culebra barrio-pueblo ===
- Comunidad Clark
- Sector Fulladosa
- Sector Melones
- Sector Sardinas I
- Sector Sardinas II

=== Flamenco ===
- Extensión Villa Muñeco
- Sector Las Delicias
- Sector Resaca
- Sector Romana
- Sector Villa Flamenco
- Sector Villa Muñeco

=== Fraile ===
- Condominio Costa Bonita
- Extensión Barriada Clark
- Sector Alturas de Zoni
- Sector Carenero
- Sector Las Vacas
- Punta Del Viento Estates
- Northview Estates

=== Playa Sardinas I ===
- Égida Felipa Serrano

=== Playa Sardinas II ===
- Sector Ensenada Honda
- Sector Punta Aloe

=== San Isidro ===
There are no sectors in San Isidro barrio.

== See also ==
- List of communities in Puerto Rico
