= Roads in Puerto Rico =

Puerto Rico Highway System
- Highway shields for primary, urban primary, secondary and tertiary sections of PR-1

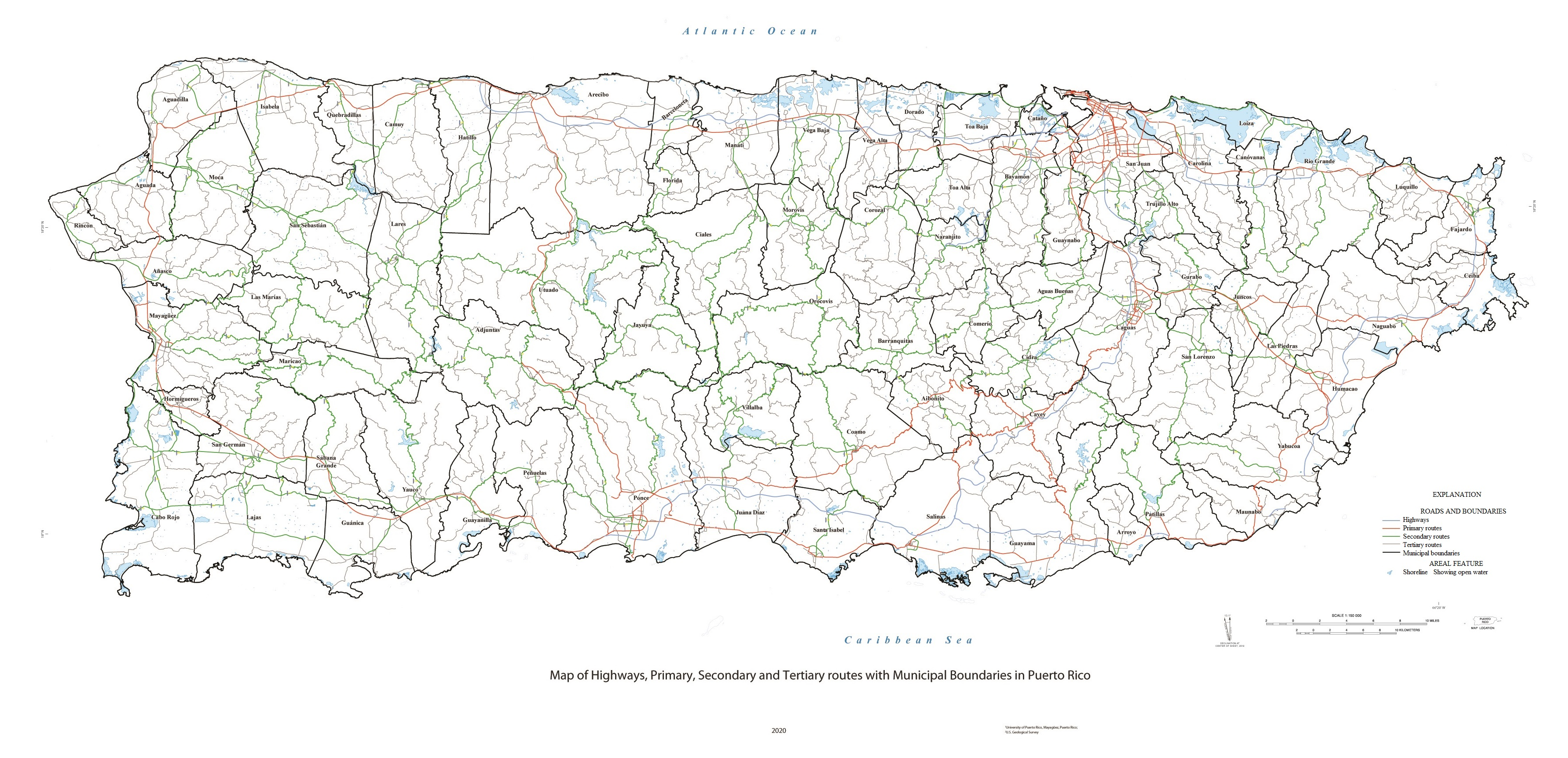

Highway names
- Interstates: Interstate PRnn (PRI-nn) (unsigned)
- Commonwealth: Puerto Rico Highway nn (PR-nn)

System links
- Roads in Puerto Rico; List

Puerto Rico has approximately 14,400 kilometers (8,900 mi) of national, forest and municipal roads. The highways serve the more than 3 million residents, and 3-4 million tourists who visit each year.

Puerto Rico's territorial highway system is divided into four networks called primary, urban primary, secondary (inter-municipal), and tertiary (local). As a road or highway changes from being part of one network type to another network type, it maintains its same number but is then marked with a corresponding shield. The National Highway System roads are maintained by the Puerto Rico Department of Transportation and Public Works (Spanish: Departamento de Transportación y Obras Públicas, or DTOP).

Puerto Rico's Interstate Highways, or the Puerto Rico Highway Program (PRHP), which are not signed, are partially funded by the US federal government, as Puerto Rico's citizens pay federal taxes. At one time, Puerto Rico was treated as a state for the remittance of federal-aid highway funds, but with TEA-21, a legislative act, "Puerto Rico no longer receives a share of the apportioned Federal-aid highway funds. TEA-21 established a new highway program for Puerto Rico, and authorized $110 million from the Highway Trust Fund for this program for fiscal years 1998-2003." More recently, for fiscal years 2016–2020, the FAST Act continues to authorize $158 million annually to the PRHP and $42 million to the Territorial Highway Program.

The Forest Highways in Puerto Rico are maintained by the United States Forest Service. These are within the El Yunque National Rain Forest, near Río Grande, Puerto Rico.

Finally, the "municipal roads" go through, and are maintained by, the 78 municipalities of Puerto Rico. Municipalities are responsible for maintaining the roads within their jurisdictions, unsigned roads. The roads within municipalities have street names and street signs, not highway names with shields. There have been memorandums of agreement between the DTOP and the municipalities on road maintenance and also disagreements over who is the responsible entity for a road's maintenance.

== History ==
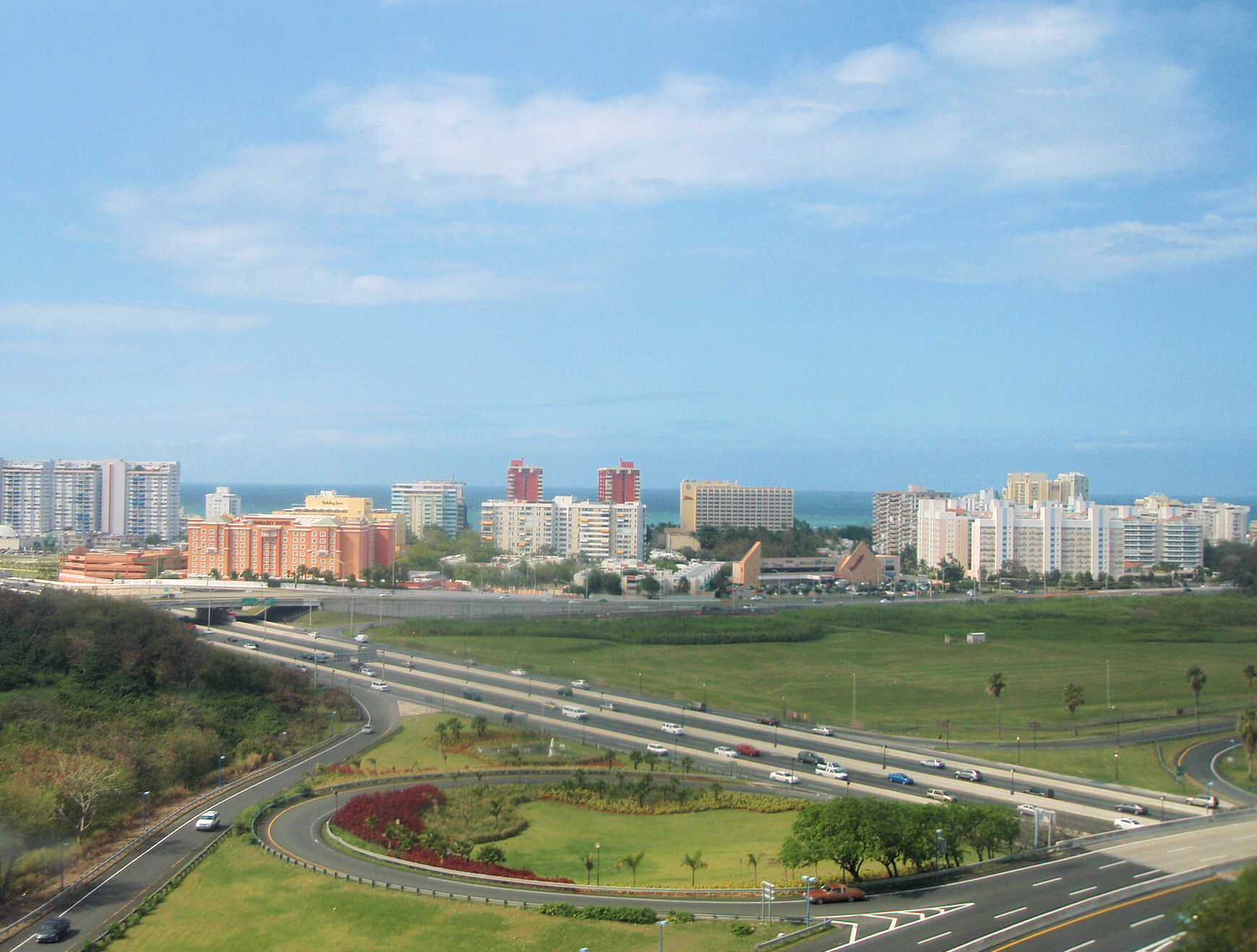
The skyline of Isla Verde, near Puerto Rico's international airport

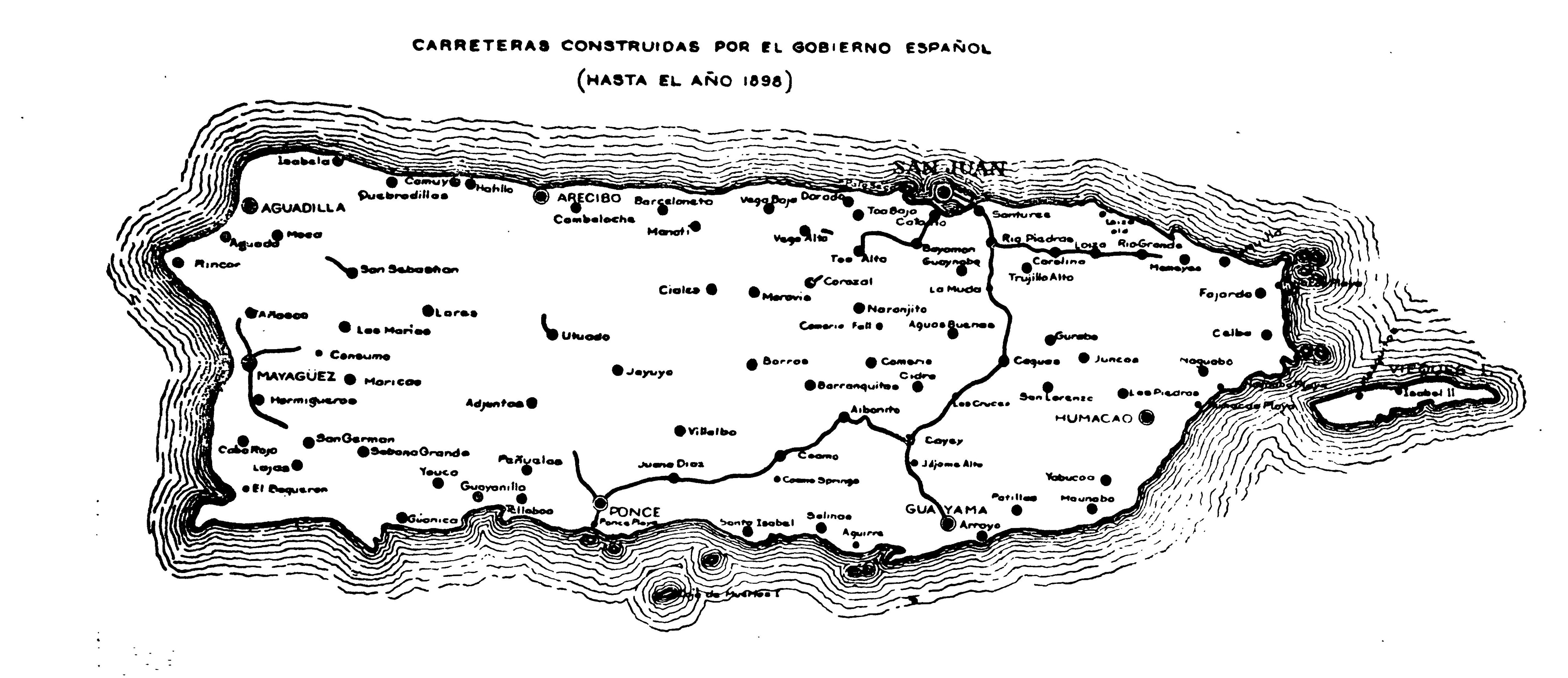
Highways in Puerto Rico constructed by Spain by 1898

By the 16th century there was a rough road called Camino de Puerto Rico connecting San Germán (which was located near the mouth of the Añasco River) to other areas of Puerto Rico, including San Sebastián, Arecibo, Toa Alta, and Caparra.

The first major routes in Puerto Rico were constructed under the Government of Spain before Puerto Rico was ceded to the United States.

The Real Decreto of 22 of January in 1886, called the Ley de carreteras para la Isla de Puerto Rico (English: Law of the highways of the island of Puerto Rico), was approved and described the highways of the island of Puerto Rico.

The first highways of Puerto Rico were paved with macadam, a layer of crushed rock and cement. The highways were maintained by the Peones Camineros, which translates to "walking workers". These workers lived, with their families, in casillas, buildings located along the highway. They were tasked with identifying when road repairs were needed. Following the system used in Spain, the buildings were spaced about six kilometers (3.7 mi) apart and, each day the Peones Camineros walked along their assigned highway stretch, the three kilometers (1.9 mi) to the left and the three kilometers to the right of their home to visually inspect the road. Normally there were two families living in the casilla, a worker, his apprentice, and their families. The Department of Public Works or Spanish: Obras Públicas was part of the Department of the Interior. Contests were held for which roads had been best maintained, so that workers could be recognized and rewarded.

This system was very effective in maintaining the condition of roads, so that after the Treaty of Paris in 1898 when the United States assessed the roads of Puerto Rico, they found a road that was, by their own admission, the best in the Americas. They called Puerto Rico's Carretera Central "the finest road in the Western Hemisphere." The U.S. also noted that, "As for roads, there are of all kinds. The State has built 285 miles [459 km] of roads, well made and in good shape. Of these, is the one from San Juan to Ponce with a branch from Cayey to Guayama. Most other roads in Puerto Rico are impassable except on horseback." At the end of the 19th century, the roads mentioned were impassable by horse and carriage.

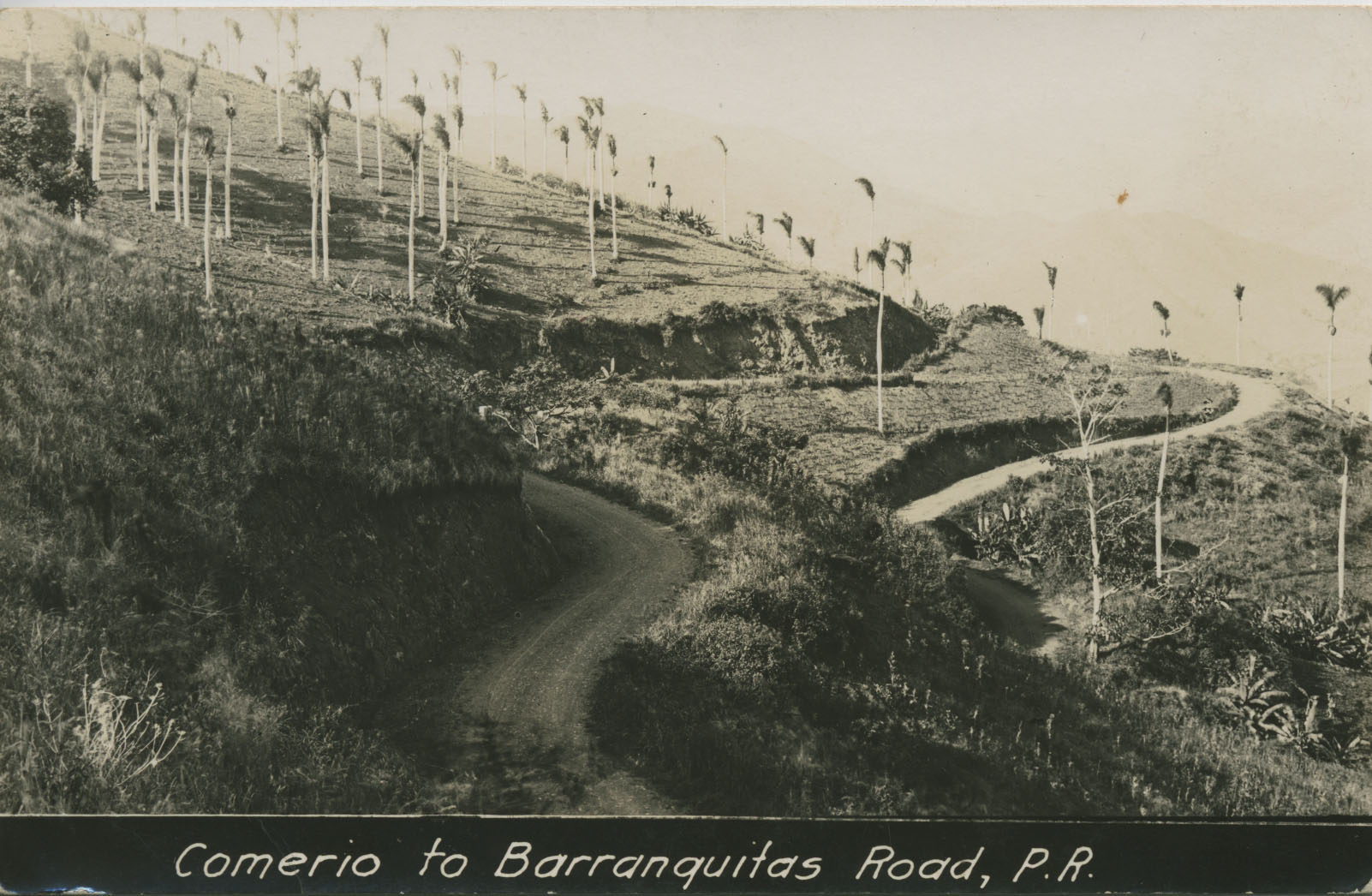
Comerio to Barranquitas Road, photograph by Attilio Moscioni c 1900-1917

In 1905, the United States, suspended the system, and once the Camineros Peatones were no longer doing a daily visual inspection, the highways quickly deteriorated. When the system was reestablished nine years later, the roads were again visually inspected daily until 1950, when the system was ended for good.

In 1940, the United States was focused on improving the ability to handle the transportation of heavy equipment over roads and bridges to and from the military bases, with a focus on national defense.

== Roadway maintenance ==
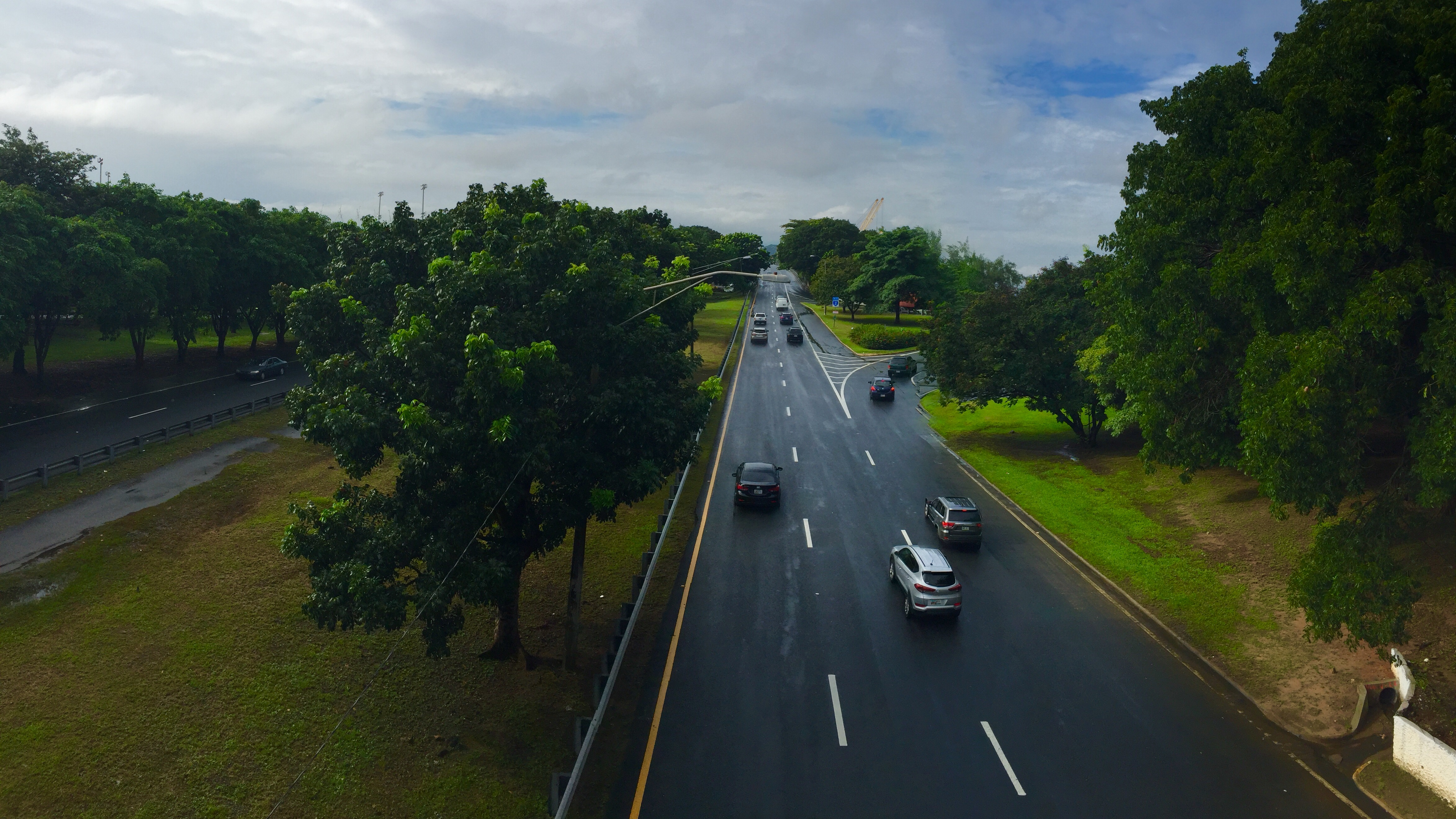
PR-2 heading away from Santurce in San Juan

Puerto Rico Highway System roads, regardless of their network classification, are maintained by the centralized, commonwealth-level, Puerto Rico Department of Transportation and Public Works, known in Spanish as the Departamento de Transportación y Obras Públicas or DTOP. Municipal governments are not responsible for maintenance of the Puerto Rico Highway System roads within their territory; whether or not the municipal government is an autonomous government, DTOP is the responsible agency. The DTOP maintains a network of regional offices throughout the island which carry out DTOP work within their multi-municipality region.

On occasion, there have been disagreements over who is responsible for the maintenance of a specific road, like in the case after Hurricane Maria, when so many roads had been heavily damaged. Municipal governments are only responsible for maintenance of city and town streets within their jurisdictions. Sometimes the central government enters into a memorandum of agreement with municipal governments for the collaborative maintenance of a Puerto Rico Highway System roadway within their municipality.

== National Highway System ==
The National Highway System of Puerto Rico (not to be confused with the National Highway System of the United States) consists of 1,151 km (715 mi) of highway and roadways of four types: primary, urban primary, secondary, and tertiary.

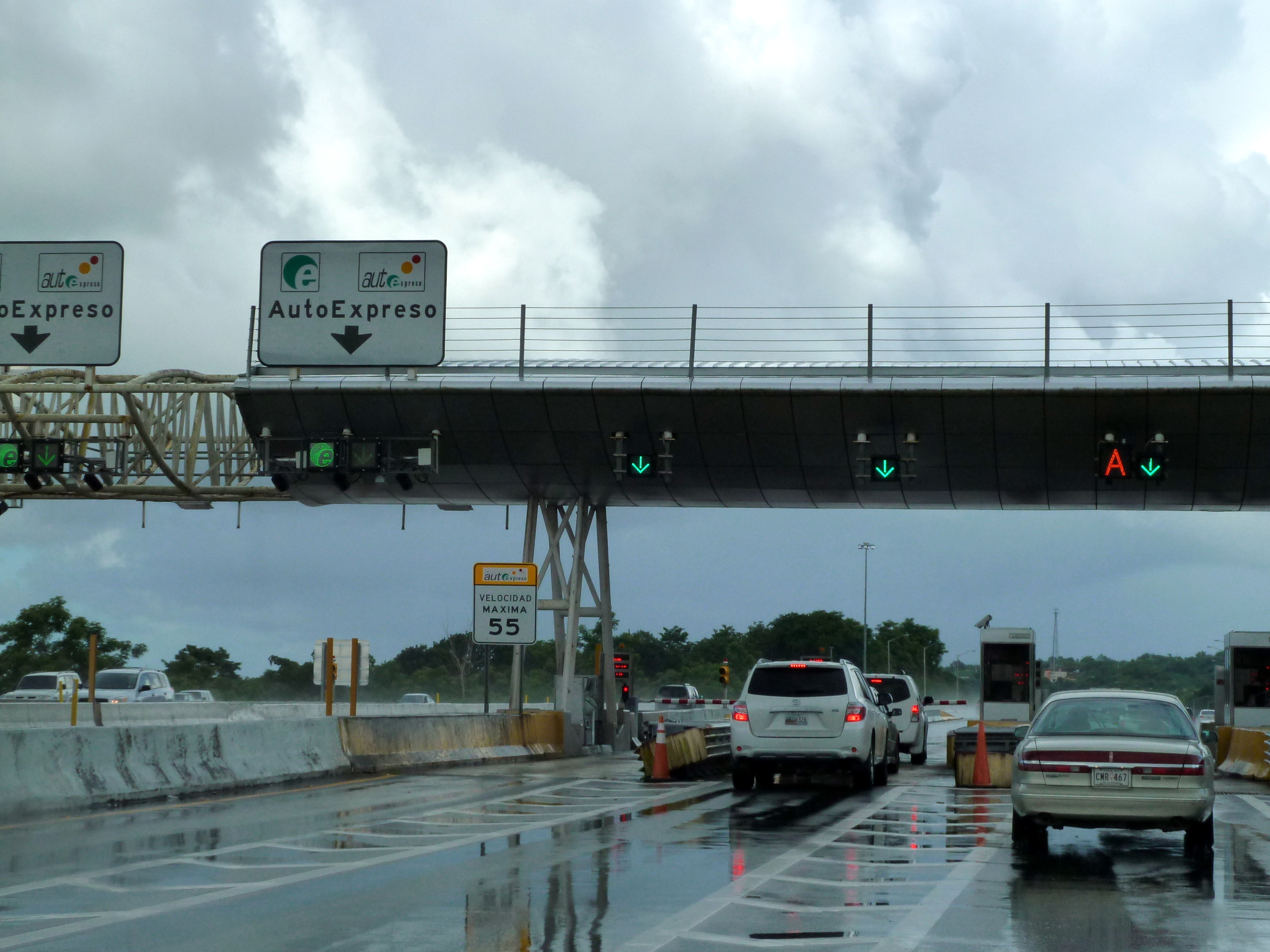
Cars going through a toll booth on PR-66

All Puerto Rico expressways are signed either primary or urban primary. Puerto Rico's controlled-access highway may be an expressway, an arterial highway with full or partial control of access. Expressways with full control of access are called freeways. If the freeway charges a toll for its use, it is called an autopista. Most toll booths use the AutoExpreso system for collecting tolls.

In 2009, primary routes were about 14% of the total Puerto Rico Highway system mileage, secondary were about 30%, and tertiary about 56%.

As a road or highway goes from being part of one network to another, it maintains its same number but is then marked with its new network shield type. An example of this is when PR-1, connecting Ponce and San Juan, is signed as urban primary inside the Ponce city limits, then is signed as secondary in Ponce's rural barrio Capitanejo, and then is signed as an urban primary road, on its entry into the town of Santa Isabel. This means that regardless of the amount of digits a road number may have, any road could be signed as primary network, urban primary network, secondary network or tertiary network all dependent on the area it goes through.

=== Primary network highways ===
Primary roads are numbered in the 1 to 99 range and are distributed randomly throughout the island. The primary highway marker has a white background and a blue shield with white lettering. A primary road's purpose is to facilitate movement of passengers and freight between major regions of the island.

Highway shield for primary section of PR-1

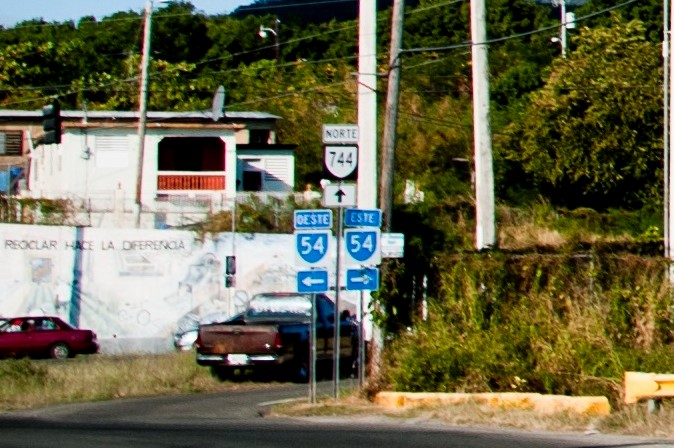
PR-54 West and East junction with PR-744 in Guayama

=== Urban primary network highways ===
The purpose of urban primary highways are to complement the primary network inside the eight metro areas: San Juan, Ponce, Mayagüez, Arecibo, Aguadilla, Humacao, Caguas and Guayama. Some highways may be designated as R for Ramal, branch in Spanish, such as PR-2 which has several R designations along its length usually as a branch or loop that goes through the center of a town while the highway continues around and on to the next municipality. This is due to the fact that the original PR-2 went through every town center but these sections were bypassed and designated R to alleviate congestion. The urban primary marker has black lettering on a white shield over a black background.

Highway shield for urban primary section of PR-1

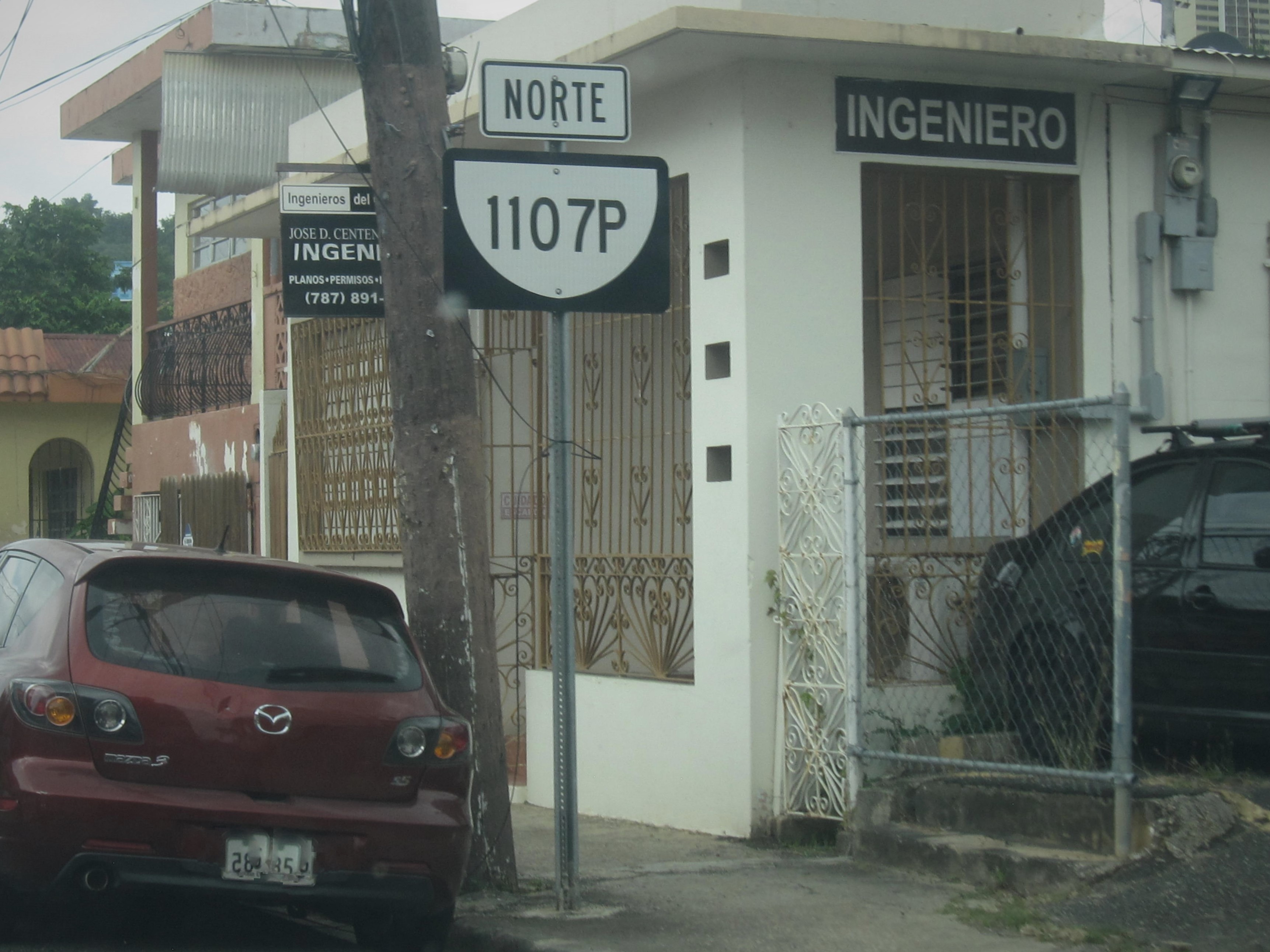
PR-1107P in Aguadilla barrio-pueblo

=== Secondary network highways ===
The secondary highways or roads provide access to municipalities from primary network roads. The secondary highway marker has yellow lettering on a blue shield with yellow trim.

Because of Puerto Rico's mountainous terrain, some of its secondary highways can be dangerous. Puerto Rico Highway 172, a road that connects Caguas and Cidra municipalities, is an example of a highway with steep inclines alongside a precipice with unsafe barriers. There are times when drivers go over a barrier and fall from the road.

Secondary roads are numbered in the 100 to 299 range and generally follow a grid pattern. They begin from the southwest portion of the island with PR-100 and increase in number in northeasterly fashion. PR-100 is located in the southwestern town of Cabo Rojo, while PR-198 is in Juncos, Las Piedras and Humacao in the eastern part of Puerto Rico. As of February 2014, the highest secondary highway number assigned was 252 (PR-252), located in the northeastern municipality-island of Culebra. PR-199 lies in Guaynabo and San Juan, not adhering to the pattern.

Highway shield for secondary section of PR-1

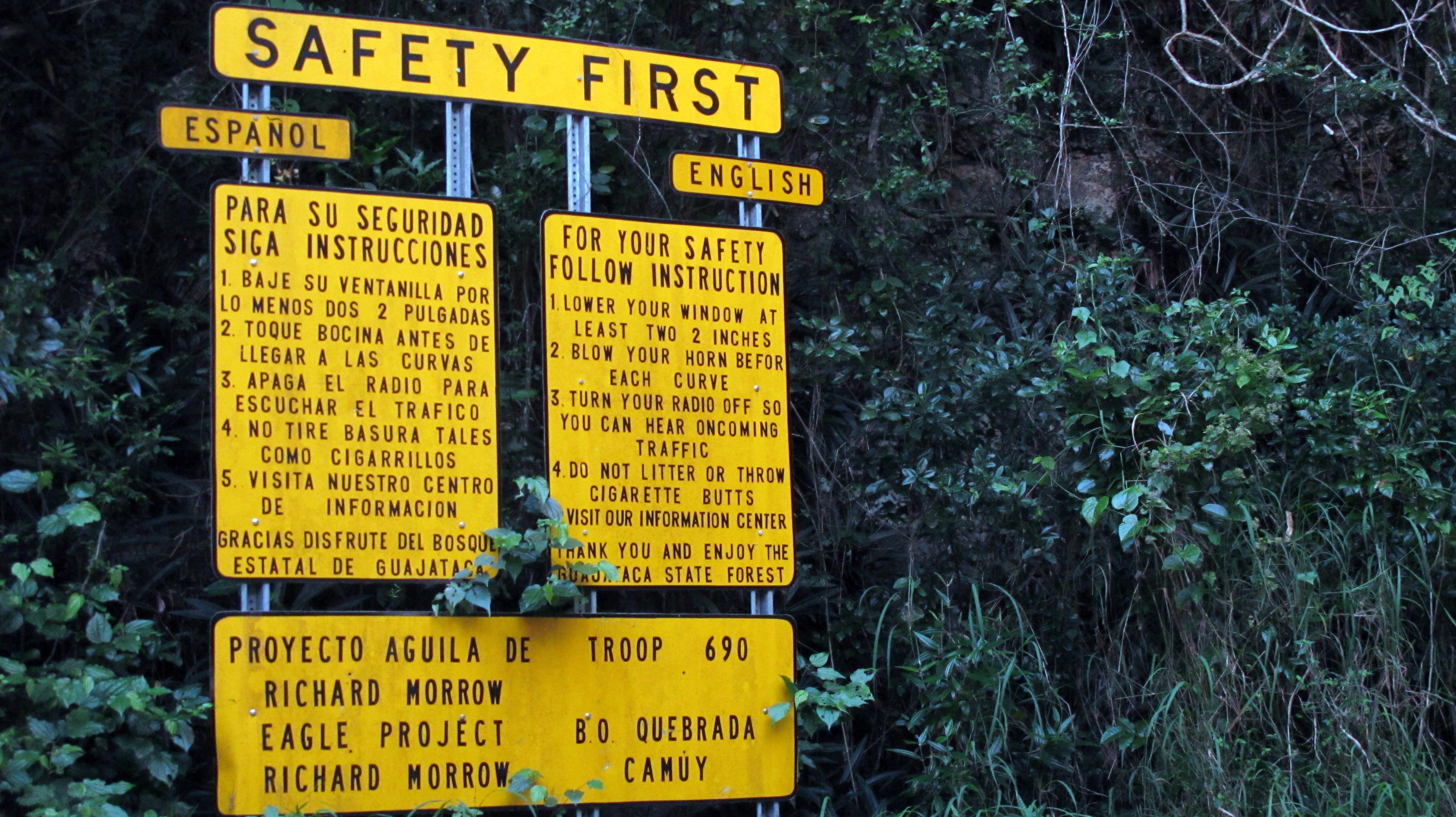
"For your safety" tips for driving in Puerto Rico sign

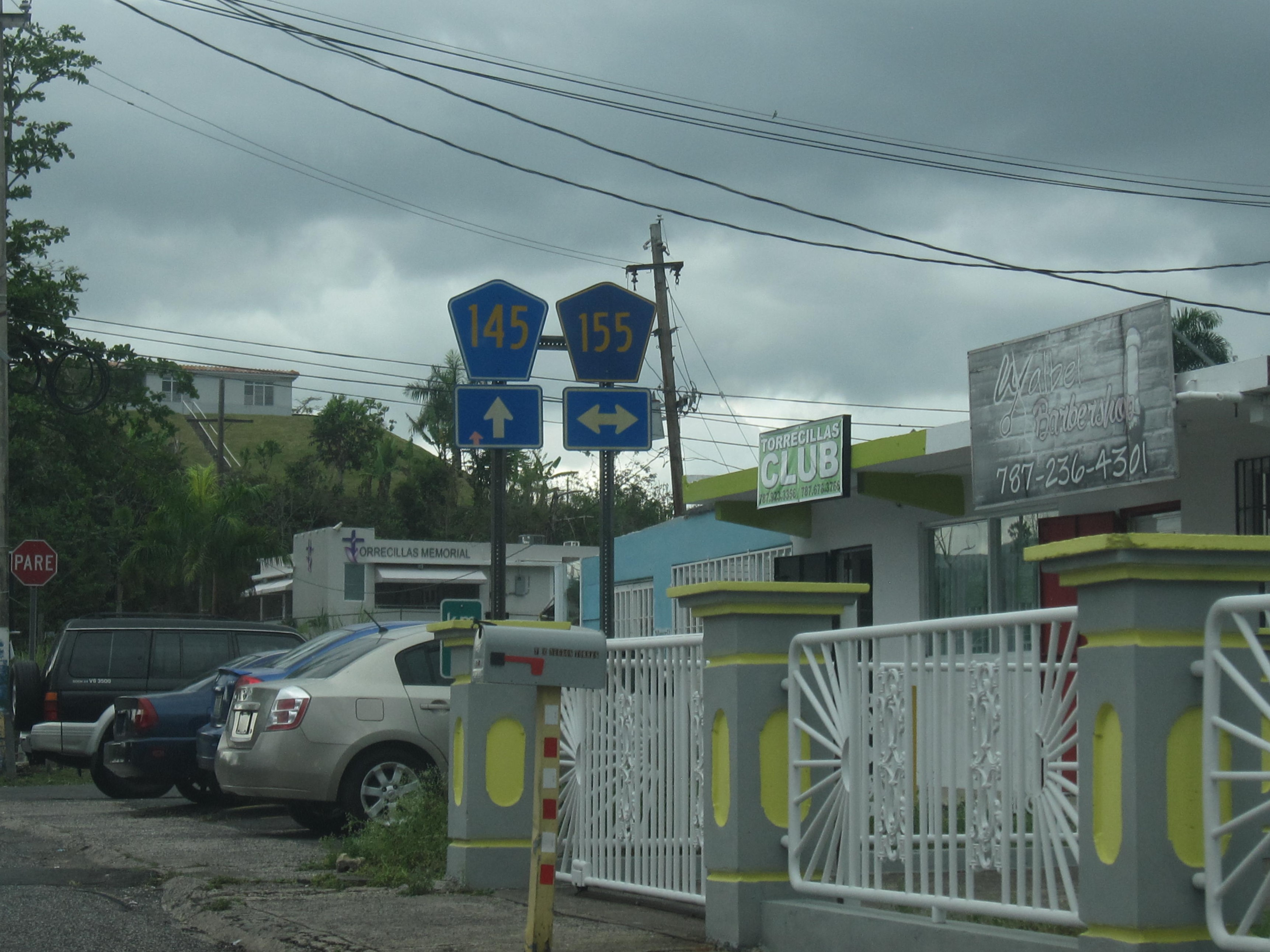
PR-145 in Torrecillas, Morovis

=== Tertiary network highways ===
Tertiary highways or roads provide access to a municipality's main urban area from peripheral communities. The tertiary highway marker has a white circle (white black lettering) on a black background. Roadways that have both their terminus within the same municipality are called tertiary roads and are, by convention, numbered PR-300 through PR-9999. The road marker in the shape of the island of Puerto Rico can also still be seen on some roadways.

==== Three-digit tertiary roads ====
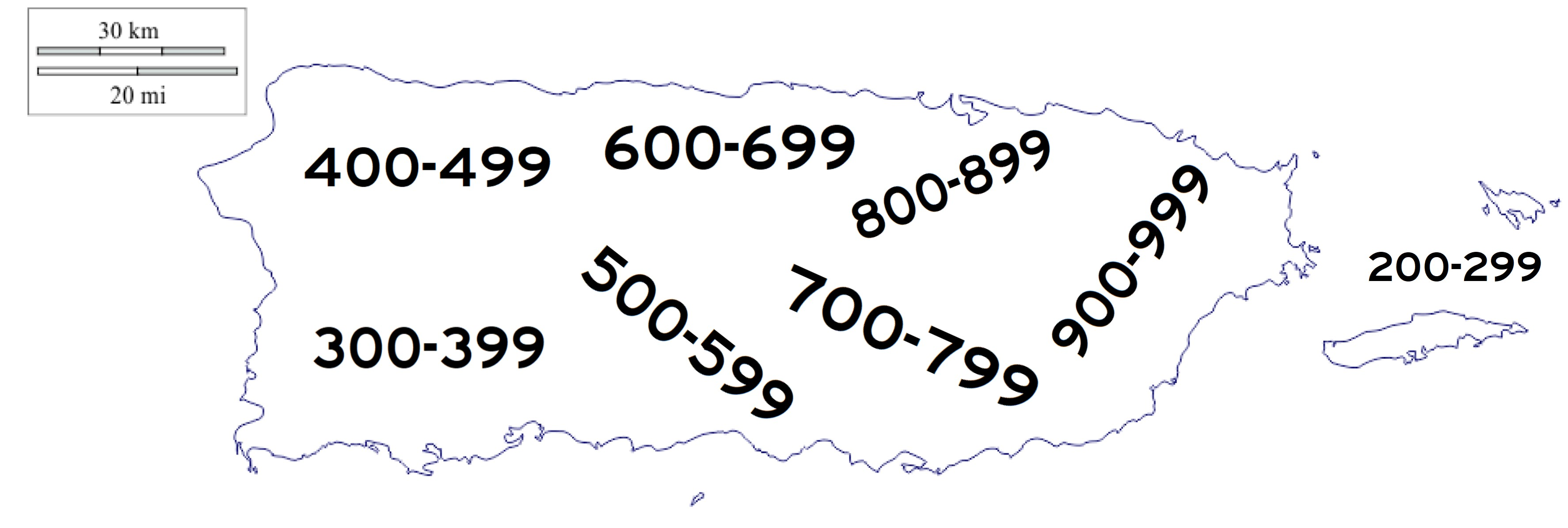

Tertiary highways also known as local highways, follow a general numbering pattern. The northern area in the region west of San Juan contains even-numbered roads, while the southern area contains odd-numbered ones. This changes in the region to the east of San Juan as both northern and southern areas are covered by roads of the 900-999 grid.

The diagram illustrates the organization of these roads and may help better understand the distribution. Some roads may start or end among differently numbered areas like in Ciales, a mountainous municipality, it has highways in both the 600-699 grid and the 500-599 grid.

Another example is in the southeastern municipality of Maunabo where the 700-799 grid overlaps the 900-999 grid.

Vieques, an offshore island-municipality, has some highways in the 900-999 grid but also has roads in the 200-299 category that is shared with Culebra, another offshore island-municipality which has PR-250 and PR-251 as its main routes.

Puerto Rico highway marker in the shape of the main island of P.R.

Highway shield for tertiary section of PR-1

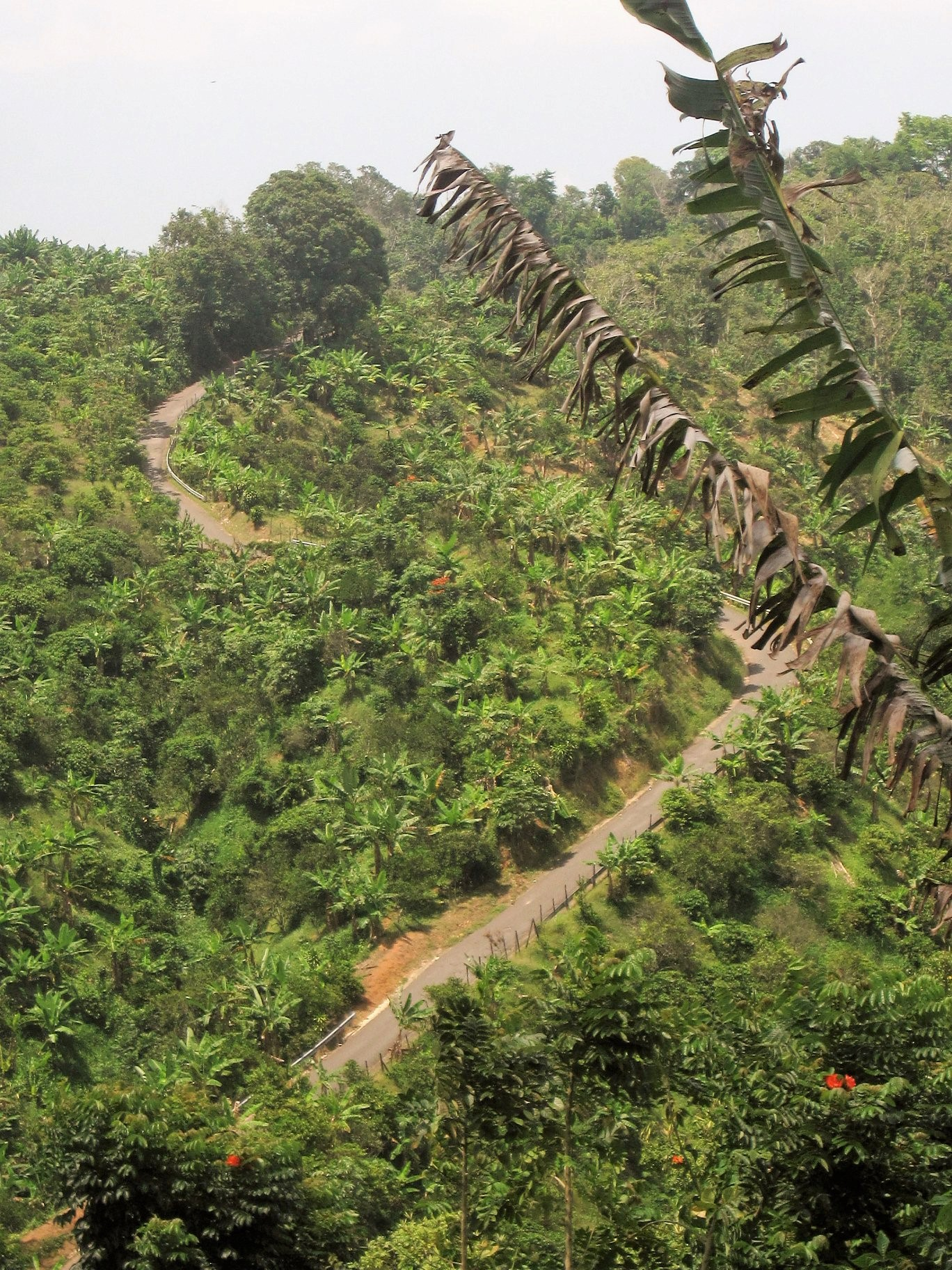
PR-438, a steep roadway, seen from Calabazas barrio, San Sebastián

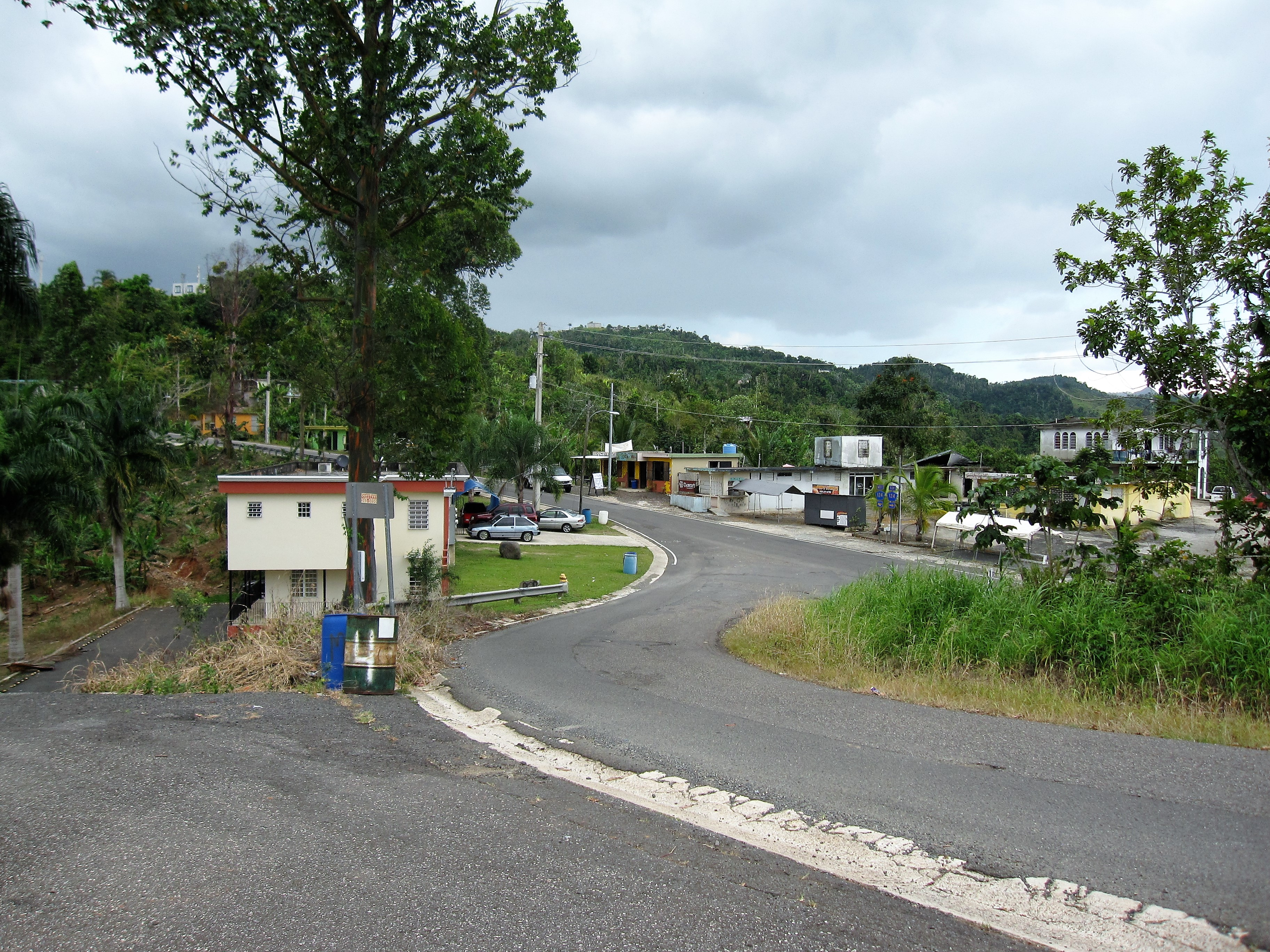
PR-435 and PR-124 highway junction in Espino, Lares

==== Four-digit tertiary roads ====
Some roads are numbered with four digits, for example, PR-5506. These are branches, or spurs, of tertiary roads by the same last three digit number. Thus, PR-5506 is a branch of PR-506. They are often dead end branches, and are common in the mountain regions of the main island. Sometimes they are loops branching off the main road, eventually connecting back to the same main tertiary road. The “fourth” digit is generally a repeat of the first digit of the main tertiary road in question. Thus, a branch of PR-301 would be signed PR-3301, with the added 3 prefixing the number of the main tertiary road associated with the spur, 301, because 3 is the first digit of the main road. When the road has more than one distinct spur, an additional unrelated digit is used (example, PR-4301).

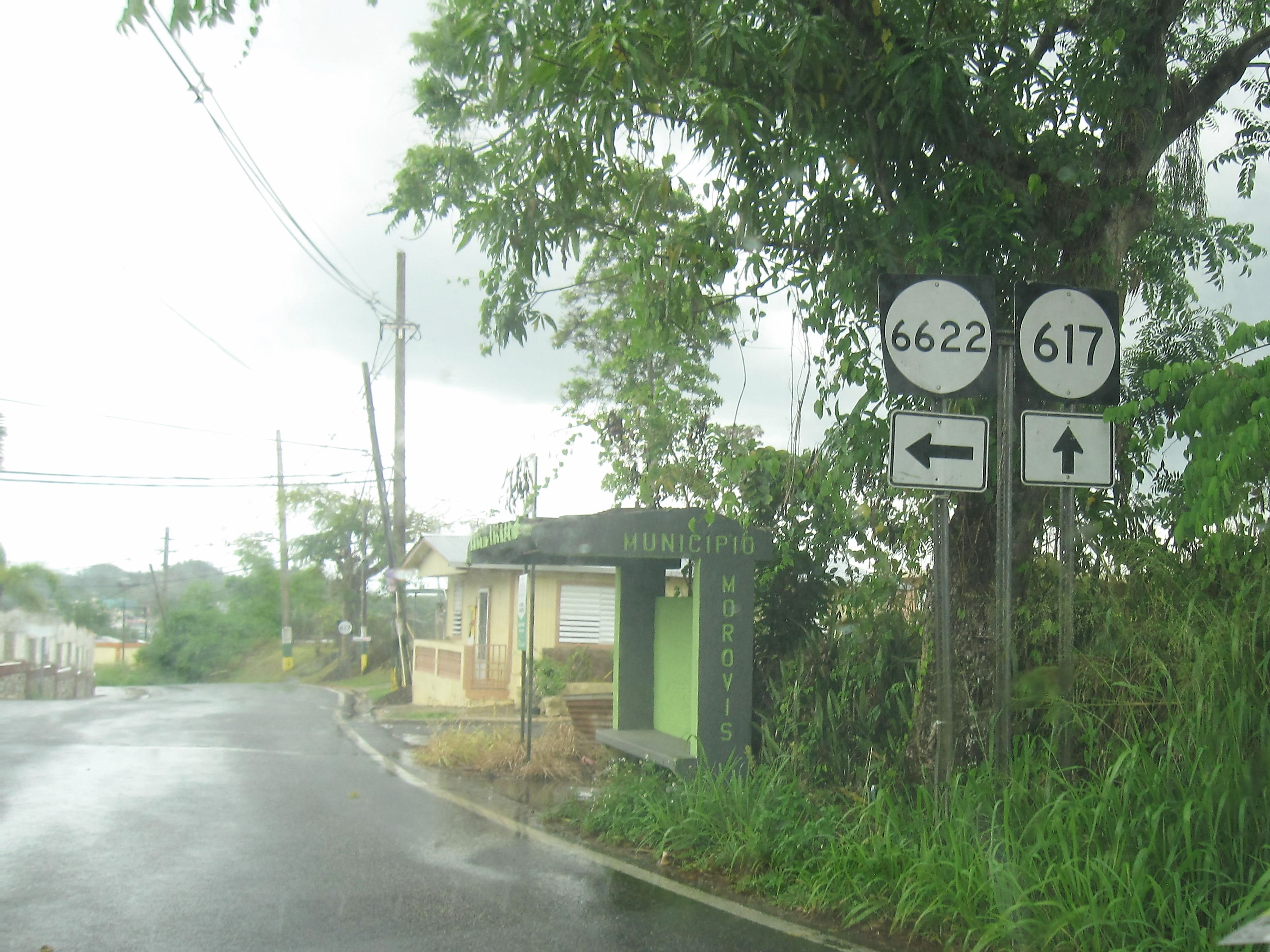
PR-6622 and PR-617 signs in Morovis

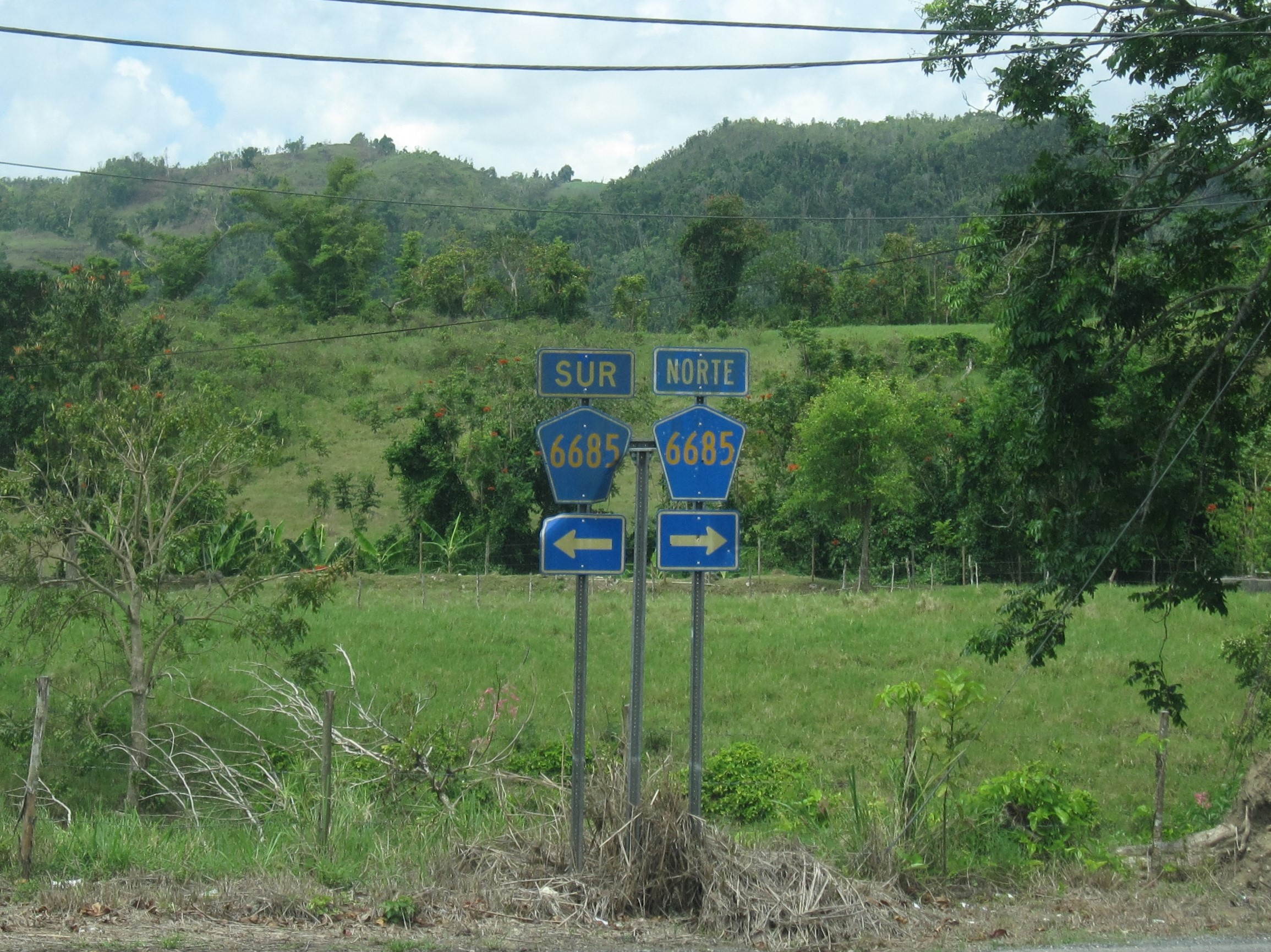
Puerto Rico Highway 6685 in Manatí

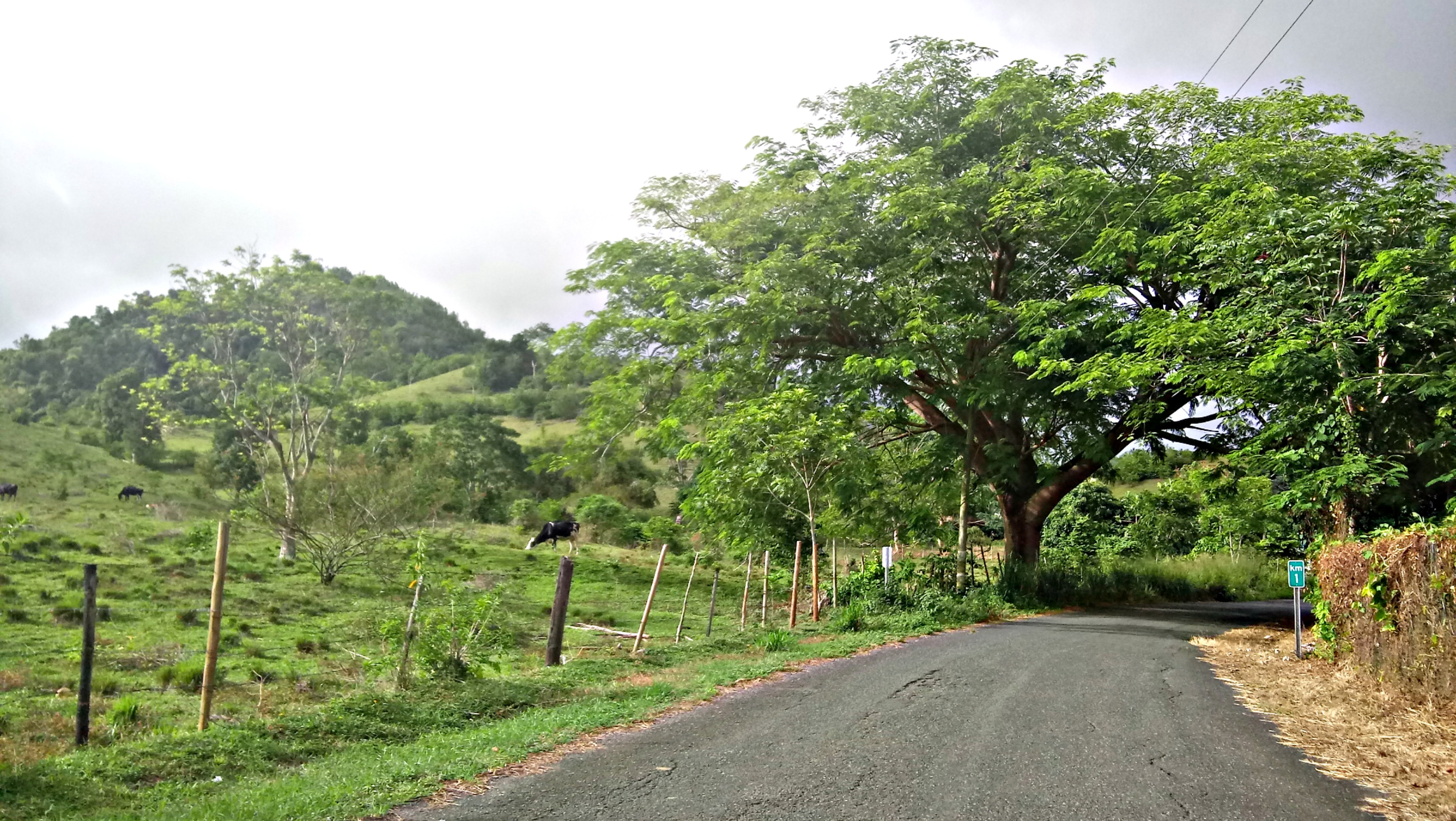
Kilometer 1.0 on a road in Naguabo

== Interstate Highway System ==
Puerto Rico Interstate Highways

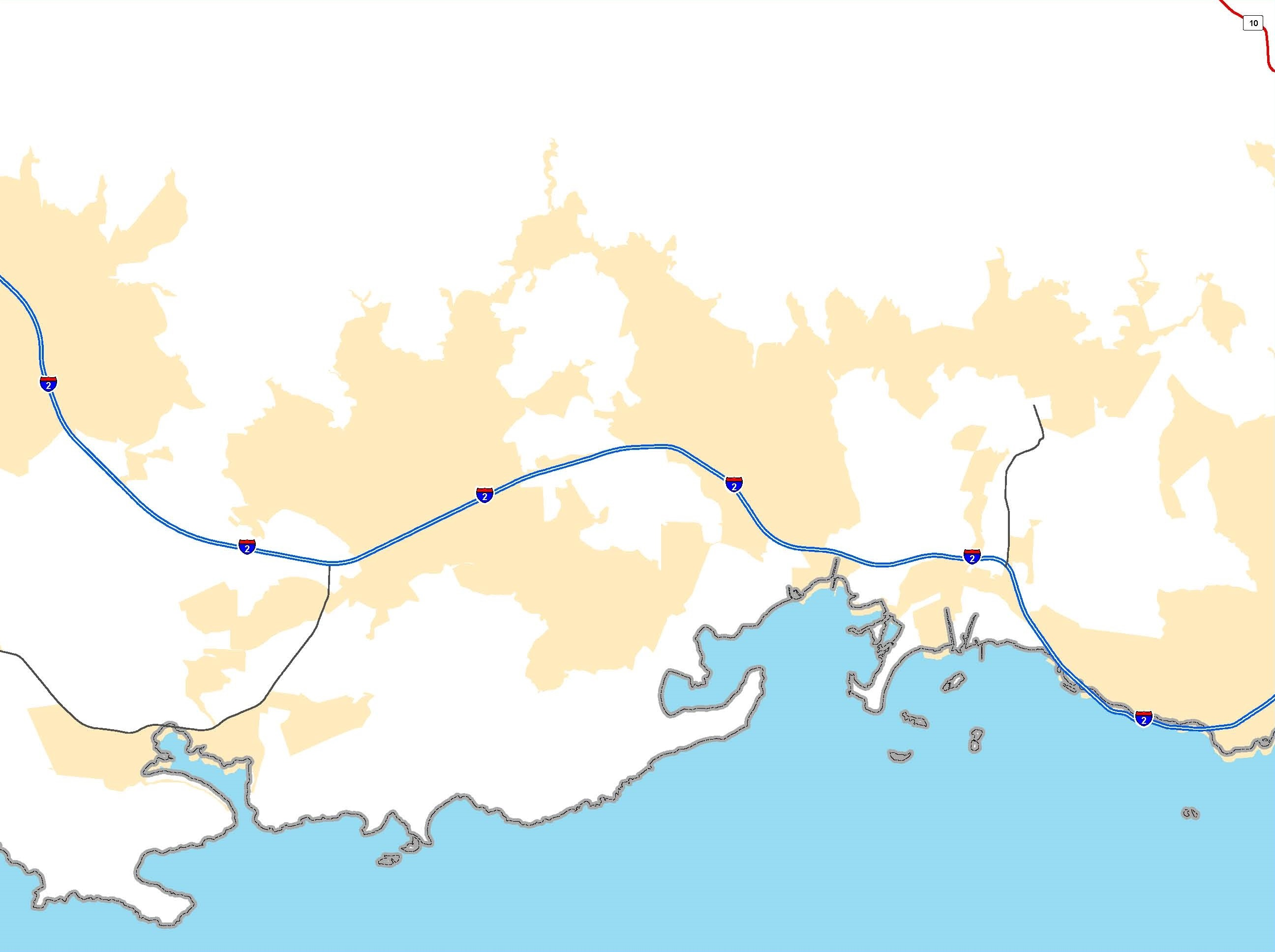
Map of "Interstate" PRI-2 and two of its arteries around Yauco municipality with urbanized areas shaded in peach

From 2016 to 2020, the authorized federal highway funding for the Puerto Rico Highway Program was $158 million per year. Puerto Rico is an island so while there are no interstate highways in that highways have no direct land connections to any other states or territories, three roadways, PRI-1, PRI-2 and PRI-3, have an Interstate Highway designation for administrative and funding purposes. Unlike Interstate routes in Hawaii, Puerto Rico Interstate routes are unsigned. They are designated as such because they receive up to 90% of their funding from the Interstate Highway System. Residents of Puerto Rico pay federal fuel and tire taxes. As of 2007, none of the highways in Puerto Rico funded by the Interstate Highway program were built up to Interstate Highway standards. As of March 2001, Puerto Rico had 410 km (250 mi) of such roadways.

PRI-1 is 114.39 kilometres (71.08 mi) long, PRI-2 is 222.30 kilometres (138.13 mi) long, and PRI-3 is 65.27 kilometres (40.56 mi) long. They run along various combinations of Puerto Rico highways and do not follow the even-and-odd-number rule used in the mainland United States. Puerto Rico is exempt from following certain specifications for its Interstate Highway System.

== U.S. Forest Highway ==
The El Yunque National Forest uses the Forest Highway road marker, a brown-colored, upside-down trapezoid with the words Bosque Nacional, (English: National Forest). This is a marker used along forest highways in the United States.

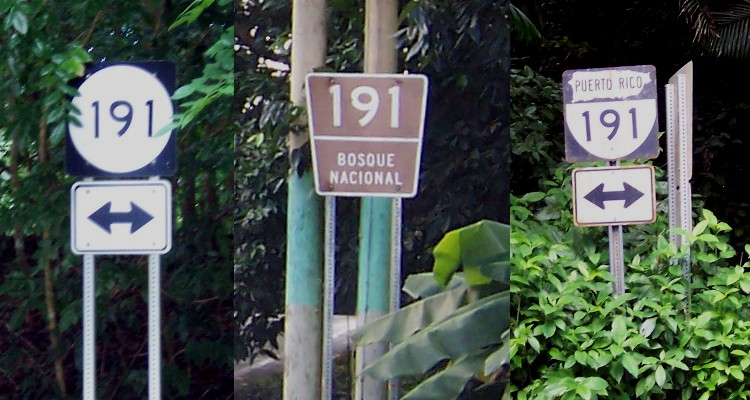
Markers at the El Yunque National Rain Forest

== Municipal roadways ==
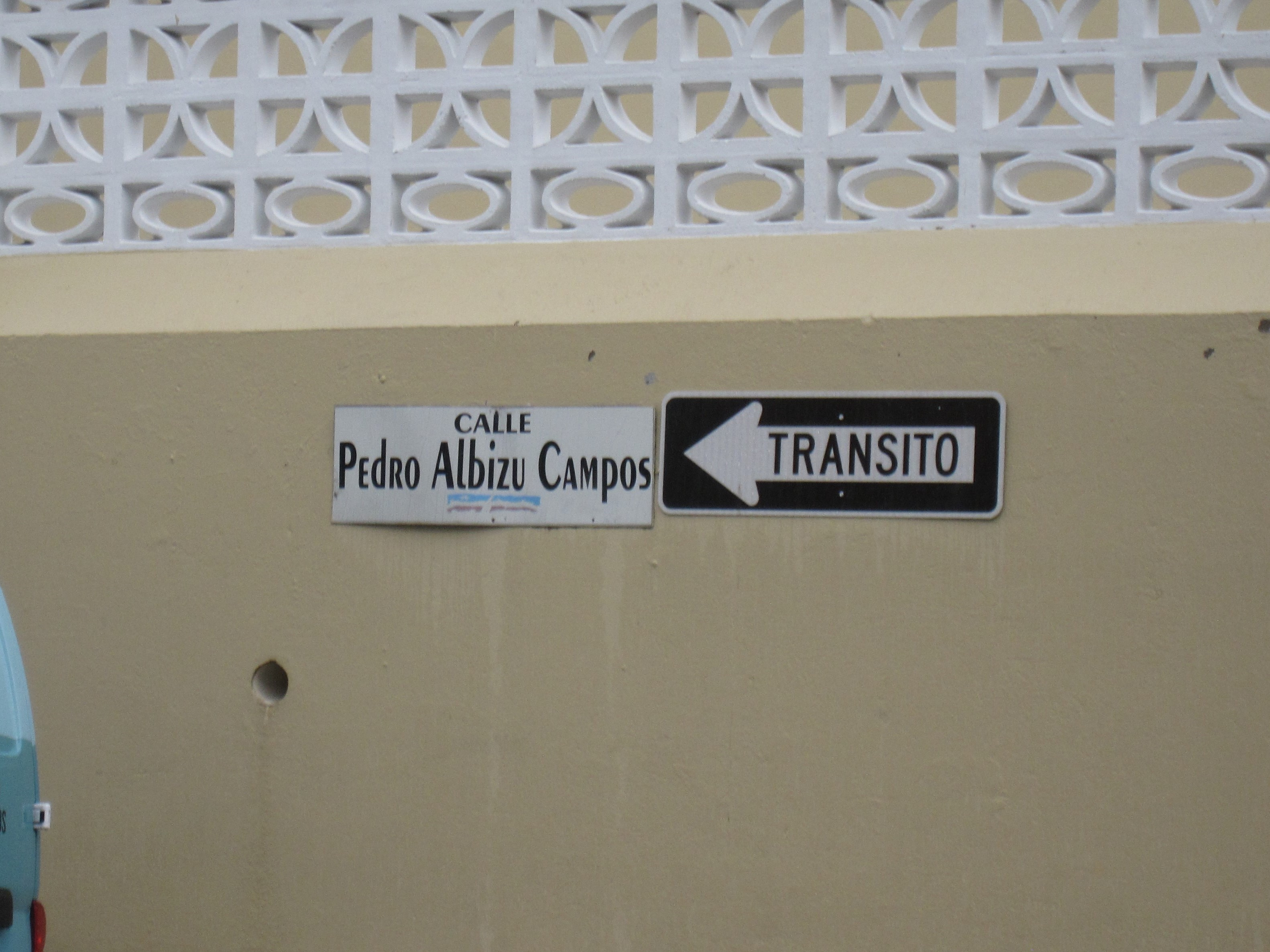
Sign for Calle Pedro Albizu Campos in Lares barrio-pueblo

In Puerto Rico, the municipal road is not a fifth network of the National Highway System of Puerto Rico. A municipal road or highway (Spanish: carretera municipal) refers to any public roadway that is not marked with a Puerto Rico National Highway network system road marker. Unlike state roads, which are signed with numbers, municipal roads are signed with names, such as Calle Pedro Albizu Campos.

Tertiary roads are not municipal roads even though the term municipal road has been used to refer to a tertiary state road. The confusion comes from the context in which the term is used. When the term municipal road occurs in the context of roads owned and maintained by the state government, municipal roads means tertiary state network roads. In this context, a municipal road and a state tertiary road both refer to the same network of state roads. However, if the term occurs in the context of roadways owned and maintained by a municipal government, it refers to the network of local streets and roadways that make up the urban landscape of a municipality.

The purpose of a road can also indicate if a road is a "municipal road" or not. In its strictest sense, municipal roads are roads within a municipality's urban center providing access from one urban neighborhood to another urban neighborhood, within the same city, town or municipality. In the larger context of the state highway system, municipal roads refer to roads that “provide access to the main urban area of a municipality from peripheral communities” (that is, tertiary roads).

Municipal roads are maintained by the municipality where the road occurs, while tertiary roads are maintained by the state government. As written under the section road maintenance, at times the state government has entered into a Memorandum of Agreement with municipal governments for the upkeep of a state tertiary roadway (note this is a state-owned road that runs entirely within a single municipality), but this does not make it a municipal road—the road continues to maintain its state signage and ownership.

== See also ==
- List of toll roads in the United States § Puerto Rico
- List of highways in Ponce, Puerto Rico
- 1953 Puerto Rico highway renumbering
- Road signs in Puerto Rico
