= Playa Sardinas II =

Barrio of Culebra, Puerto Rico

- Barrio
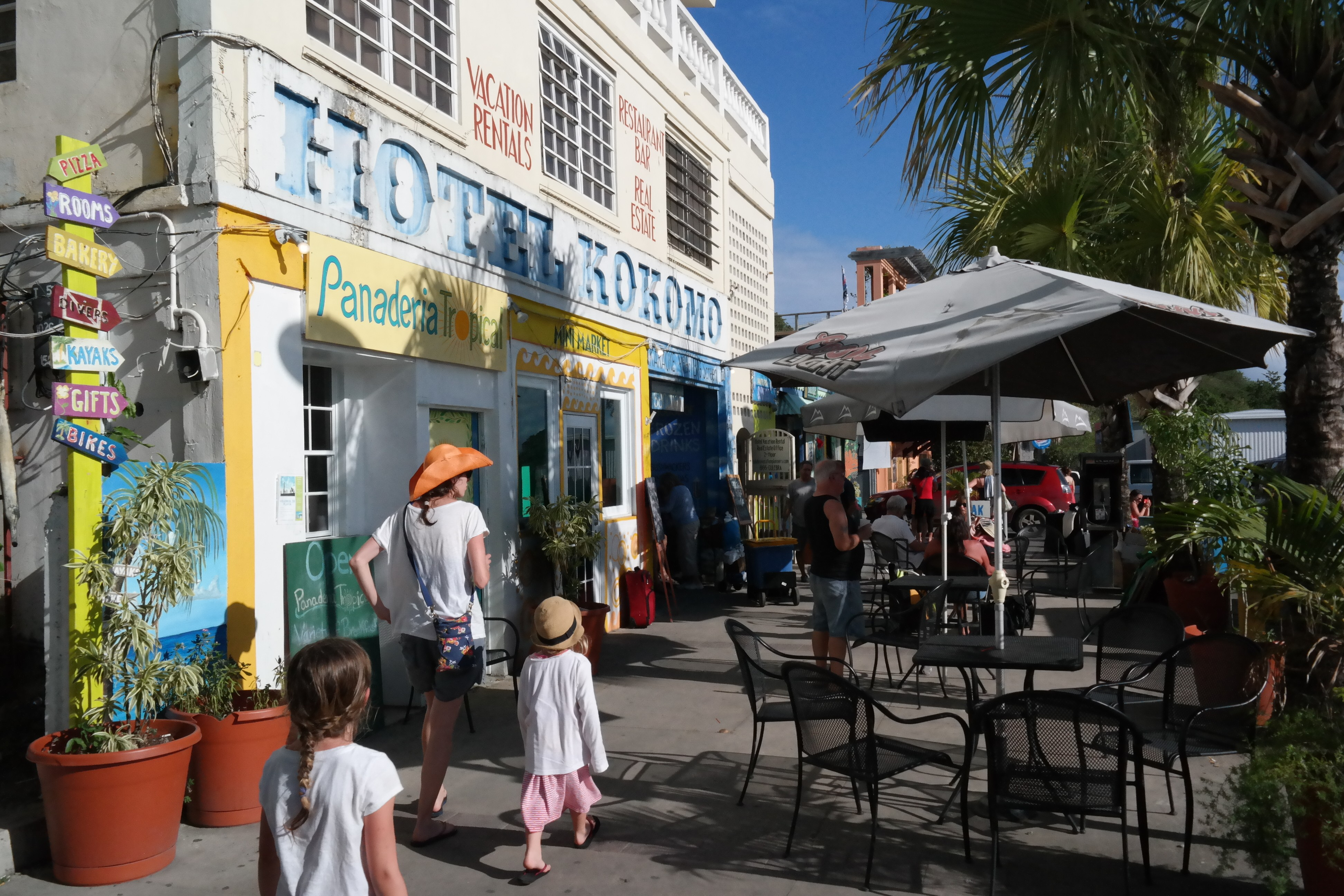
- Hotel Kokomo in Playa Sardinas II

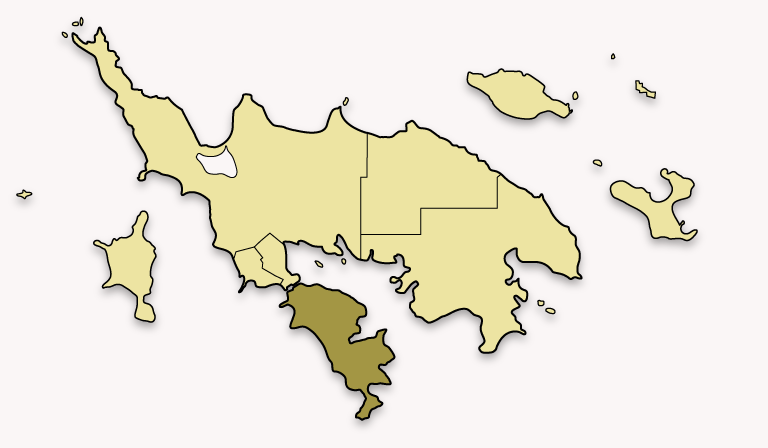
- Map of Culebra highlighting Playa Sardinas II

- Location within Puerto Rico
- Coordinates: 18°17′16″N 65°17′06″W
- Commonwealth: Puerto Rico
- Municipality: Culebra

Area
  - Total: 24.3 sq mi (63 km^{2})
  - Land: 1.0 sq mi (2.6 km^{2})
  - Water: 23.3 sq mi (60 km^{2})
- Elevation: 0 ft (0 m)

Population (2010)
  - Total: 64
  - Density: 64/sq mi (25/km^{2})
- Source: 2010 Census
- Time zone: UTC−4 (AST)
- ZIP Code: 00775

Playa Sardinas II is a barrio in the municipality of Culebra, Puerto Rico. Its population in 2010 was 64.

Historical population
| Census | Pop. | Note | %± |
|---|---|---|---|
| 1950 | 23 | | — |
| 1970 | 46 | | — |
| 1980 | 93 | | 102.2% |
| 1990 | 78 | | −16.1% |
| 2000 | 122 | | 56.4% |
| 2010 | 64 | | −47.5% |
U.S. Decennial Census; 1899 (shown as 1900) 1910-1930; 1930-1950 1980-2000 2010

== Features ==
Laguna Lobina is located in Playa Sardinas II.

== Sectors ==
Barrios (which are, in contemporary times, roughly comparable to minor civil divisions) in turn are further subdivided into smaller local populated place areas/units called sectores (sectors in English). The types of sectores may vary, from normally sector to urbanización to reparto to barriada to residencial, among others.

The following sectors are in Playa Sardinas II barrio:

Sector Ensenada Honda, and Sector Punta Aloe.

== Gallery ==
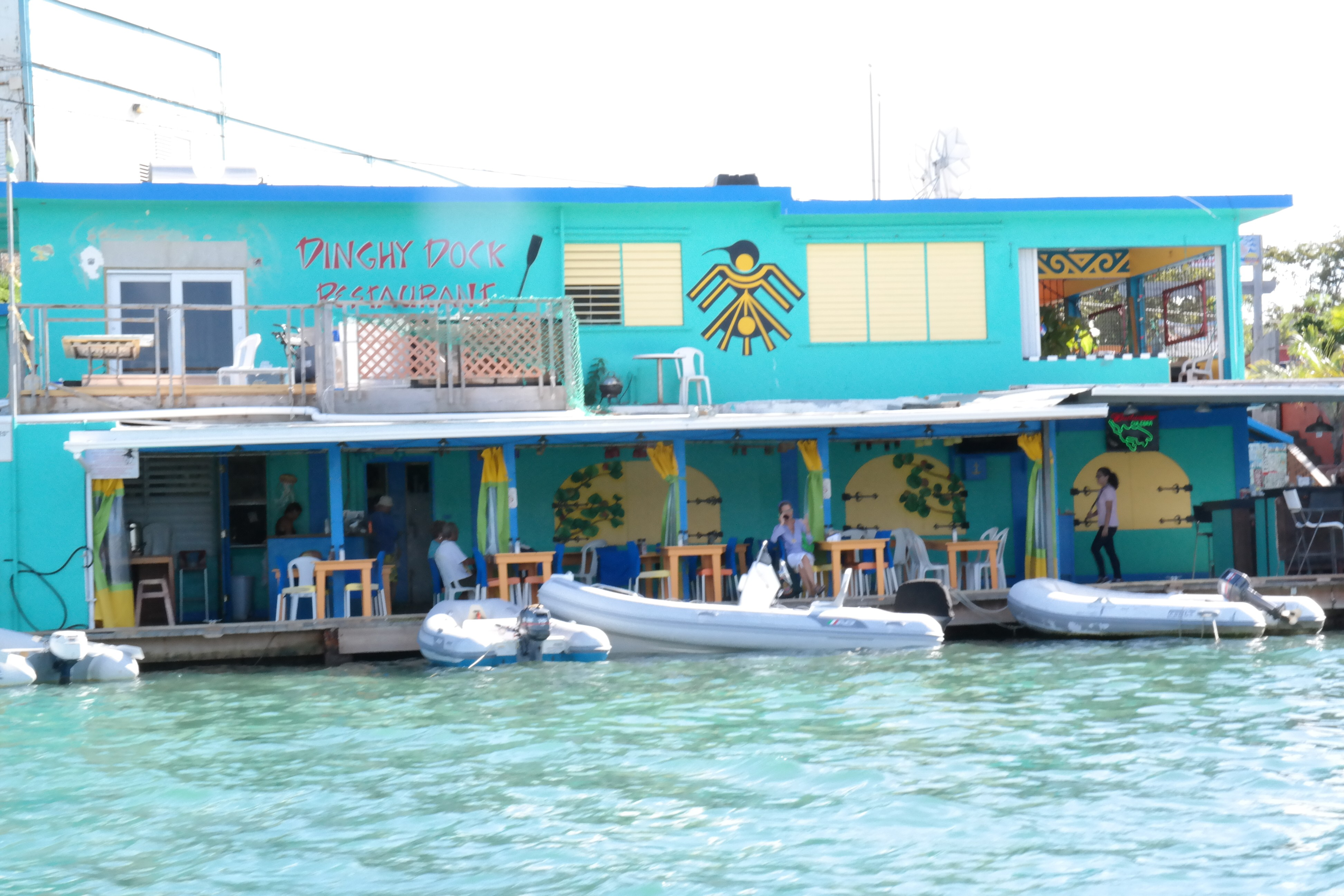
Laguna Lobina in Playa Sardinas II

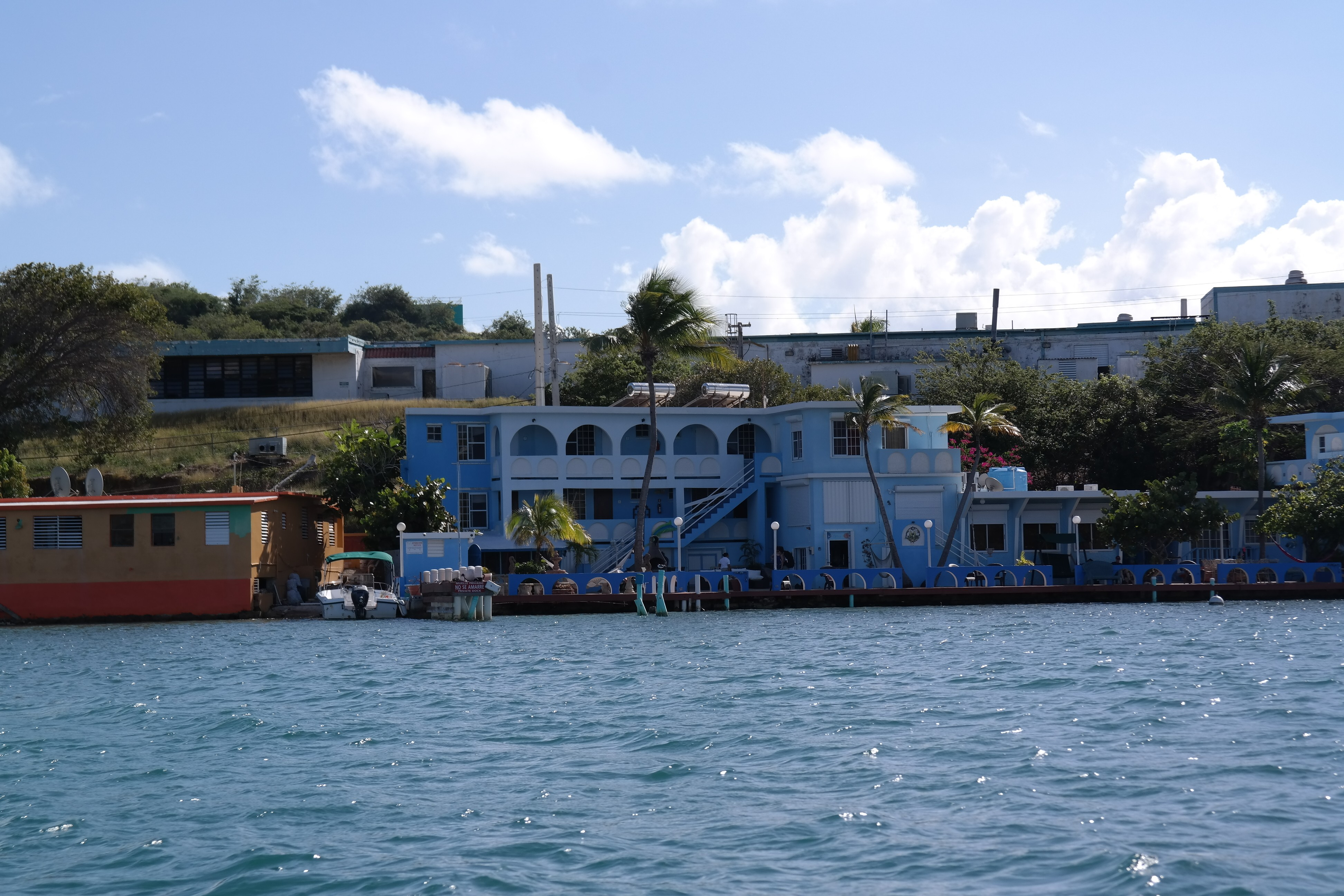
Laguna Lobina in Playa Sardinas II

== See also ==
- List of communities in Puerto Rico
- List of barrios and sectors of Culebra, Puerto Rico
