= Playa Sardinas I =

Barrio of Culebra, Puerto Rico

- Barrio
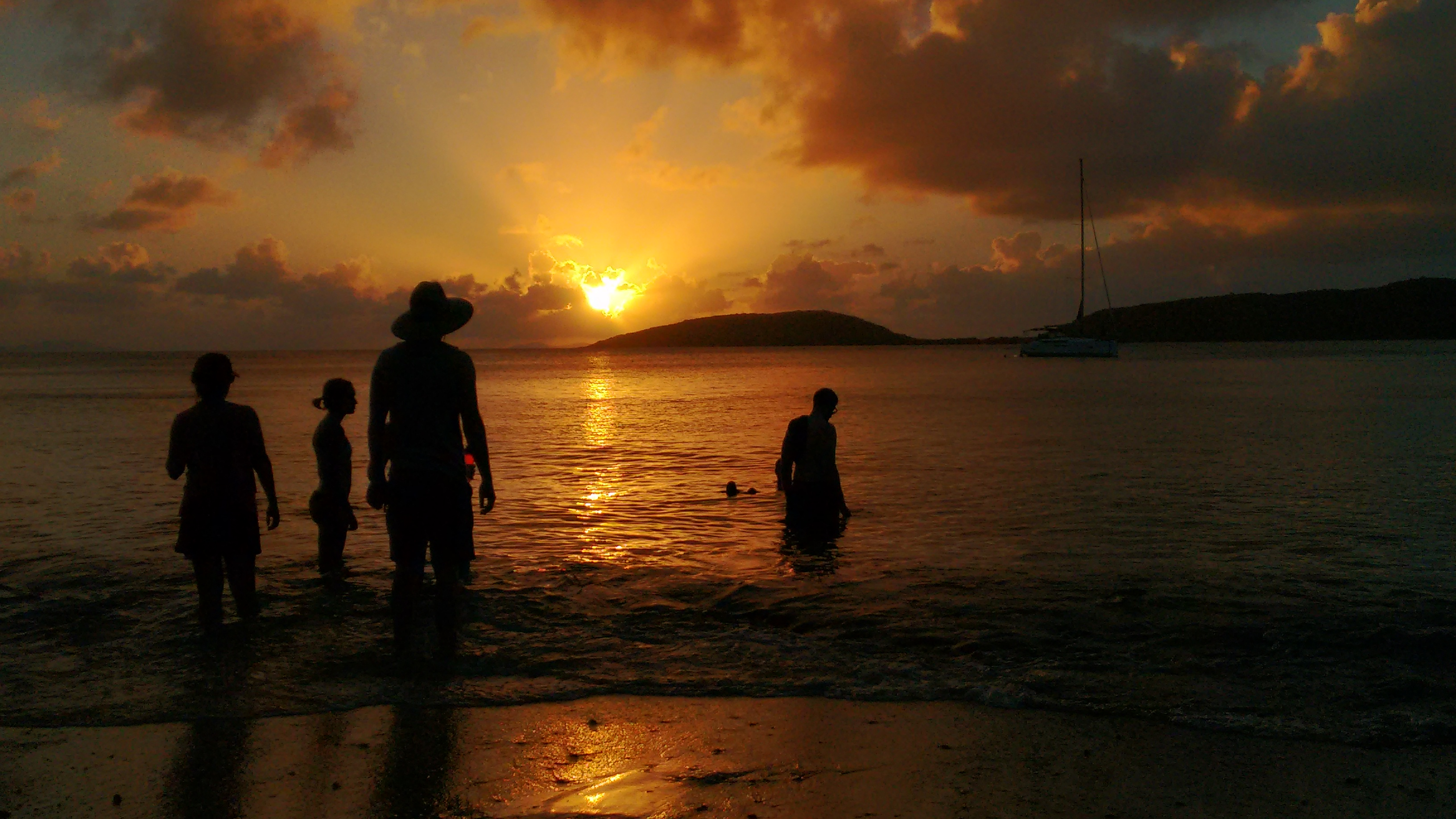
- Playa Melones in Playa Sardinas I

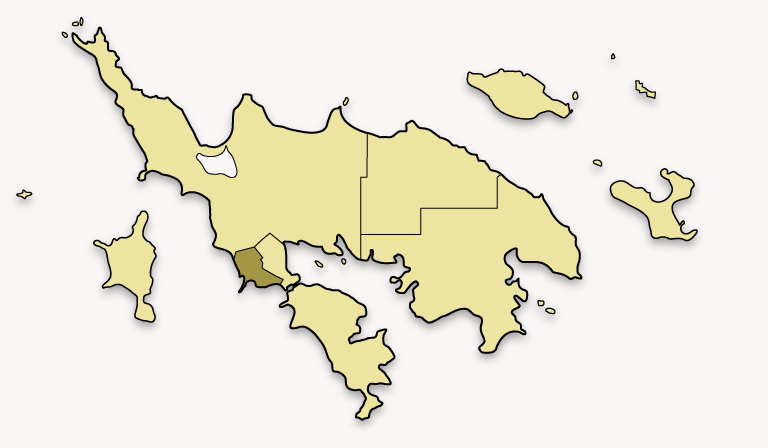
- Map of Culebra highlighting Playa Sardinas I

- Location within Puerto Rico
- Coordinates: 18°18′09″N 65°18′29″W
- Commonwealth: Puerto Rico
- Municipality: Culebra

Area
  - Total: 6.53 sq mi (16.9 km^{2})
  - Land: 0.19 sq mi (0.49 km^{2})
  - Water: 6.34 sq mi (16.4 km^{2})
- Elevation: 0 ft (0 m)

Population (2010)
  - Total: 186
  - Density: 978.9/sq mi (378.0/km^{2})
- Source: 2010 Census
- Time zone: UTC−4 (AST)
- ZIP Code: 00775

Playa Sardinas I is a barrio in the municipality of Culebra, Puerto Rico. Its population in 2010 was 186.

Historical population
Census	Pop.	Note	%±
1950	23		—
1960	33		43.5%
1970	0		−100.0%
1980	44		—
1990	119		170.5%
2000	136		14.3%
2010	186		36.8%
U.S. Decennial Census; 1899 (shown as 1900) 1910-1930; 1930-1950 1980-2000 2010

== Features ==
In 2010, Playa Sardinas I had 0.19 square miles (0.49 km^{2}) of land area and a population of 186 with a population density of 978.9 persons per square mile.

Playa Melones is a secluded beach in Playa Sardinas I which is good for snorkeling.

== Sectors ==
Barrios (which are, in contemporary times, roughly comparable to minor civil divisions) in turn are further subdivided into smaller local populated place areas/units called sectores (sectors in English). The types of sectores may vary, from normally sector to urbanización to reparto to barriada to residencial, among others.

The following sectors are in Playa Sardinas I barrio:

Égida Felipa Serrano.

== See also ==
- List of communities in Puerto Rico
- List of barrios and sectors of Culebra, Puerto Rico
