= Culebra barrio-pueblo =

Historical and administrative center (seat) of Culebra, Puerto Rico

Culebra barrio-pueblo Pueblo de Culebra Dewey
- Municipality Seat
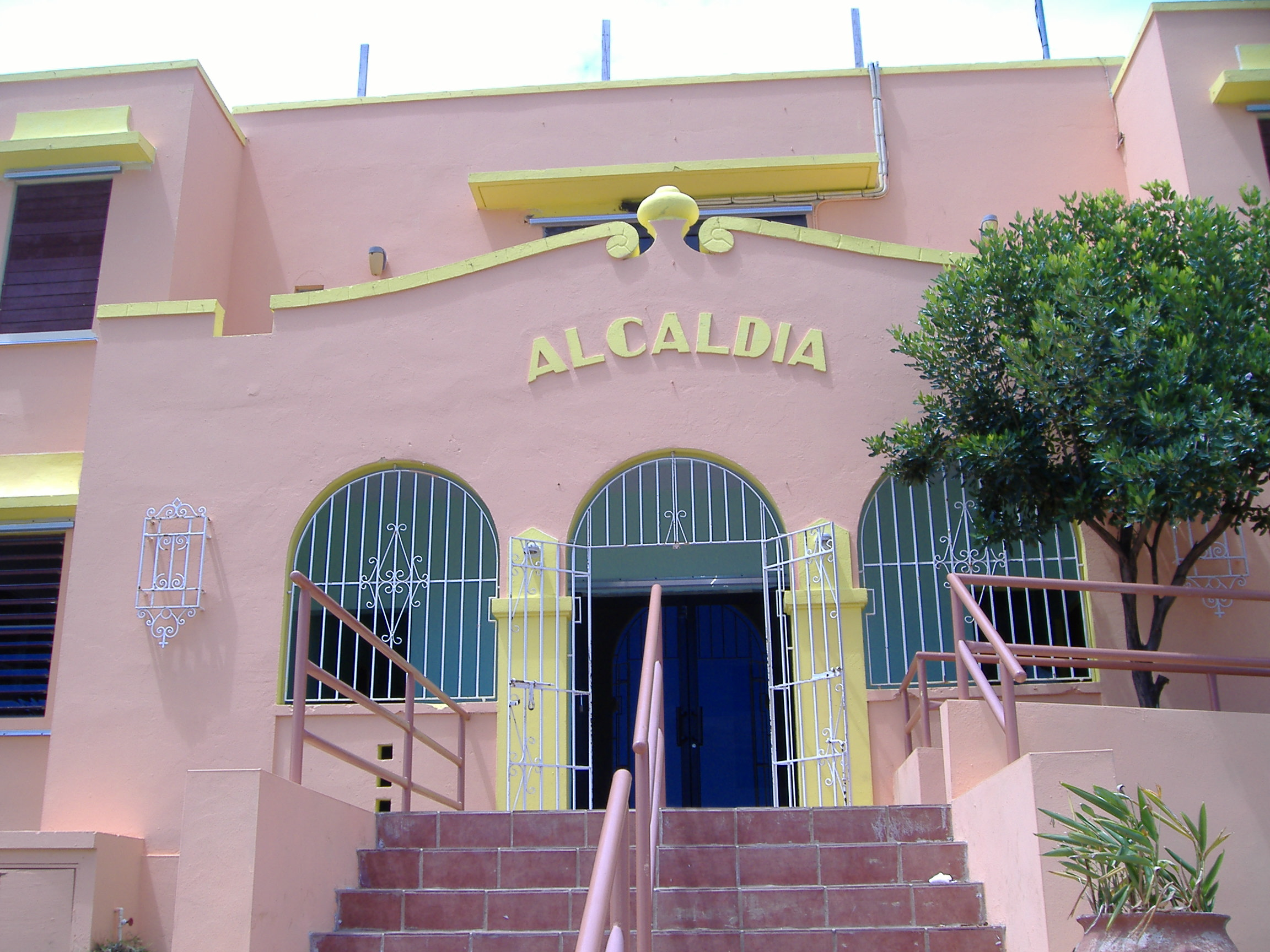
- Town Hall in Culebra barrio-pueblo

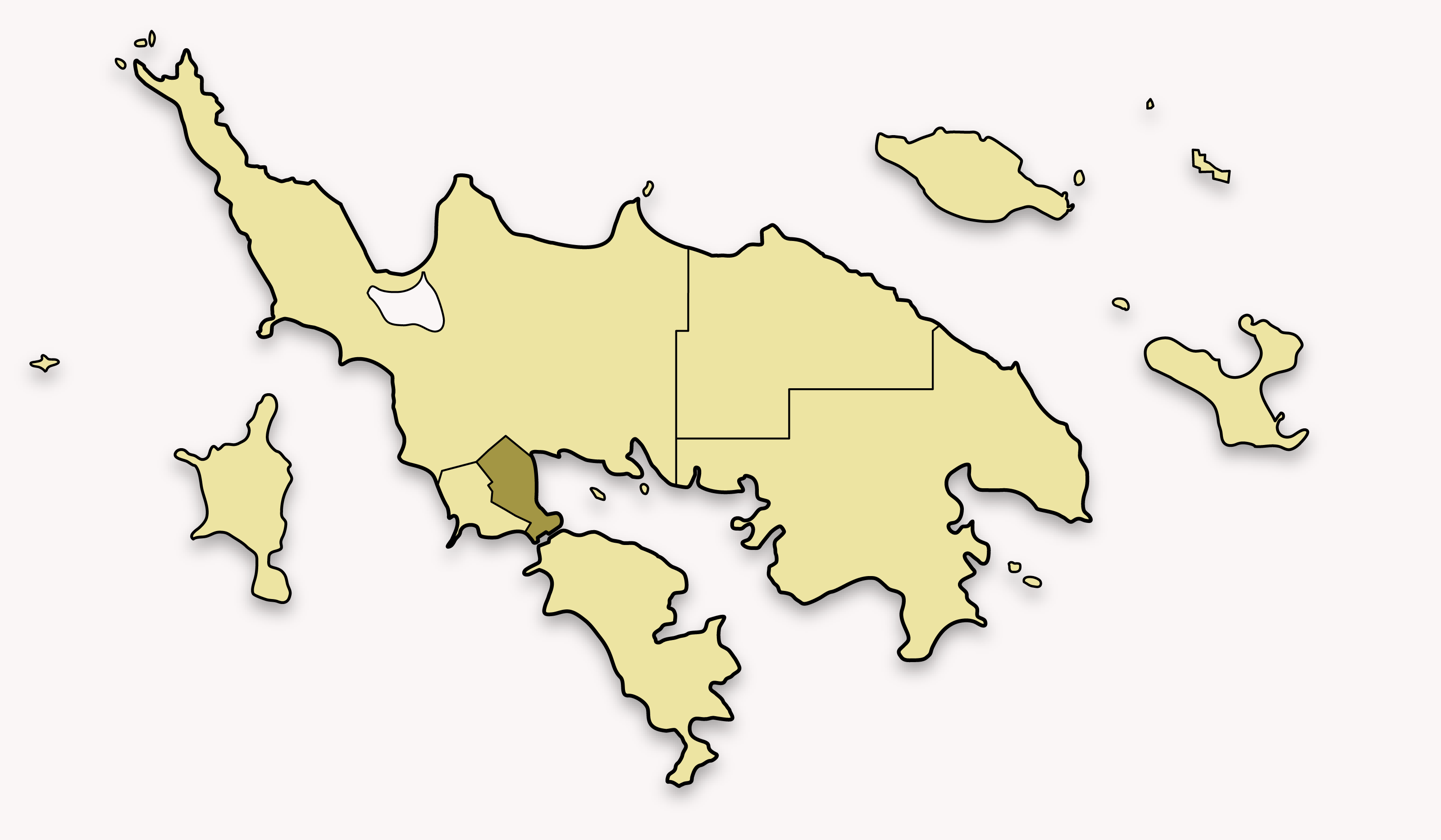
- Location of Culebra barrio-pueblo within the municipality of Culebra highlighted

- Location of Culebra in Puerto Rico
- Coordinates: 18°18′21″N 65°18′08″W
- Commonwealth: Puerto Rico
- Municipality: Culebra

Area
  - Total: 0.22 sq mi (0.57 km^{2})
  - Land: 0.13 sq mi (0.34 km^{2})
  - Water: 0.09 sq mi (0.23 km^{2})
- Elevation: 10 ft (3.0 m)

Population (2010)
  - Total: 462
  - Density: 3,553.8/sq mi (1,372.1/km^{2})
- Source: 2010 Census
- Time zone: UTC−4 (AST)
- ZIP Code: 00775

Culebra barrio-pueblo or Culebra Pueblo (English: Culebra Town, historically: Dewey) is a barrio and the administrative center (seat) of Culebra, an island-municipality of Puerto Rico. Its population in 2010 was 462.

As was customary in Spain, in Puerto Rico, the municipality has a barrio called pueblo which contains a central plaza, the municipal buildings (city hall), and a Catholic church. Fiestas patronales (patron saint festivals) are held in the central plaza every year.

== The central plaza and its church ==
The central plaza, or square, is a place for official and unofficial recreational events and a place where people can gather and socialize from dusk to dawn. The Laws of the Indies, Spanish law, which regulated life in Puerto Rico in the early 19th century, stated the plaza's purpose was for "the parties" (celebrations, festivities) (Spanish: a propósito para las fiestas), and that the square should be proportionally large enough for the number of neighbors (Spanish: grandeza proporcionada al número de vecinos). These Spanish regulations also stated that the streets nearby should be comfortable portals for passersby, protecting them from the elements: sun and rain.

At one time, this barrio was referred to as Dewey.

Located across from the central plaza is the Parroquia Nuestra Señora del Carmen (English: Our Lady of Mount Carmel Parish), a Roman Catholic church. The church is made of concrete and faces east.

== History ==
Culebra barrio-pueblo was in Spain's gazetteers until Puerto Rico was ceded by Spain in the aftermath of the Spanish–American War under the terms of the Treaty of Paris of 1898 and became an unincorporated territory of the United States. In 1899, the United States Department of War conducted a census of Puerto Rico finding that the population of Culebra barrio-pueblo was 206.

Historical population
Census	Pop.	Note	%±
1900	206		—
1910	384		86.4%
1920	265		−31.0%
1930	377		42.3%
1940	472		25.2%
1950	693		46.8%
1960	498		−28.1%
1970	0		−100.0%
1980	849		—
1990	707		−16.7%
2000	652		−7.8%
2010	462		−29.1%
U.S. Decennial Census; 1899 (shown as 1900, is an estimate) 1910-1930; 1930-1950 1980-2000 2010

== Sectors ==
Barrios (which are, in contemporary times, roughly comparable to minor civil divisions) in turn are further subdivided into smaller local populated place areas/units called sectores (sectors in English). The types of sectores may vary, from normally sector to urbanización to reparto to barriada to comunidad to residencial, among others.

The following sectors are in Culebra barrio-pueblo:

Comunidad Clark, Sector Fulladosa, Sector Melones, Sector Sardinas I, and Sector Sardinas II.

== Gallery ==
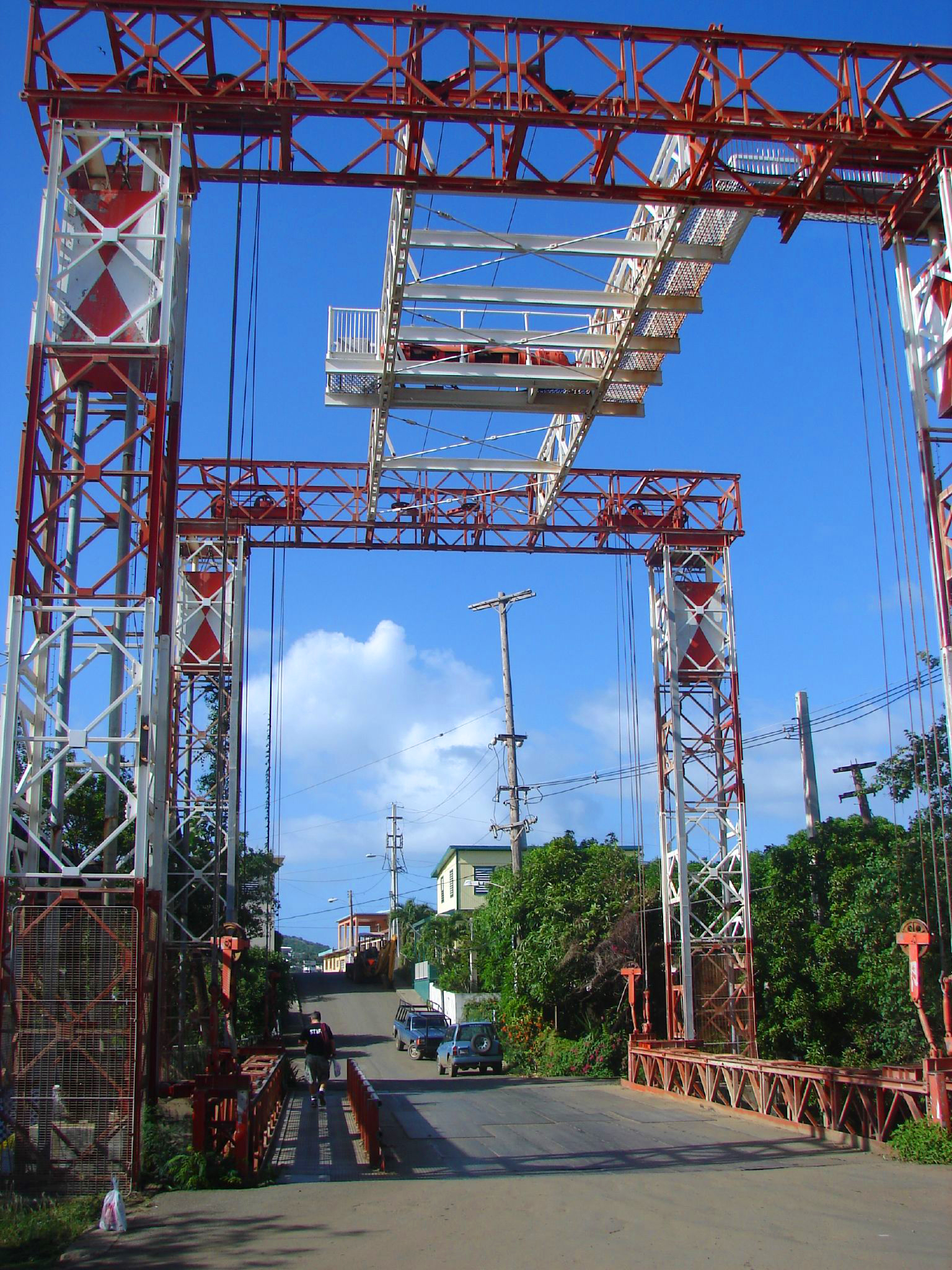
Drawbridge in Culebra

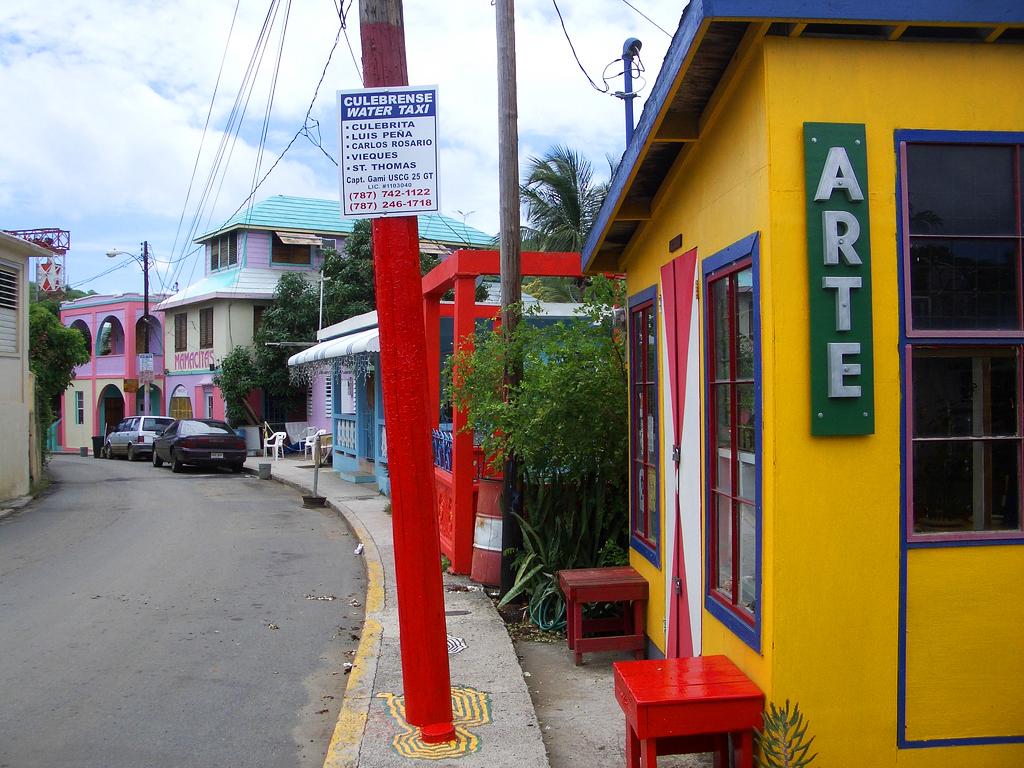
A street and homes in Culebra barrio-pueblo in 2005

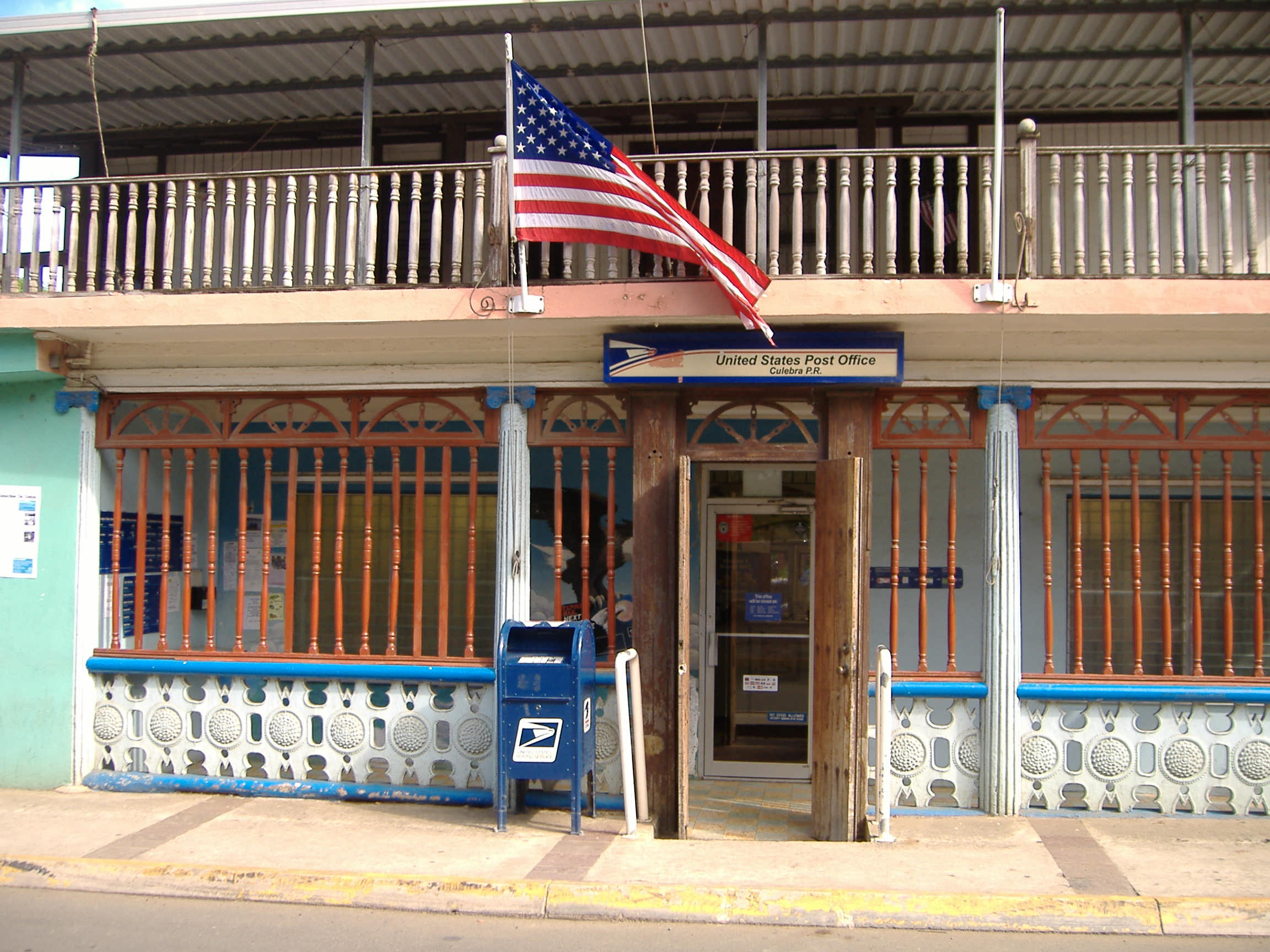
Post Office

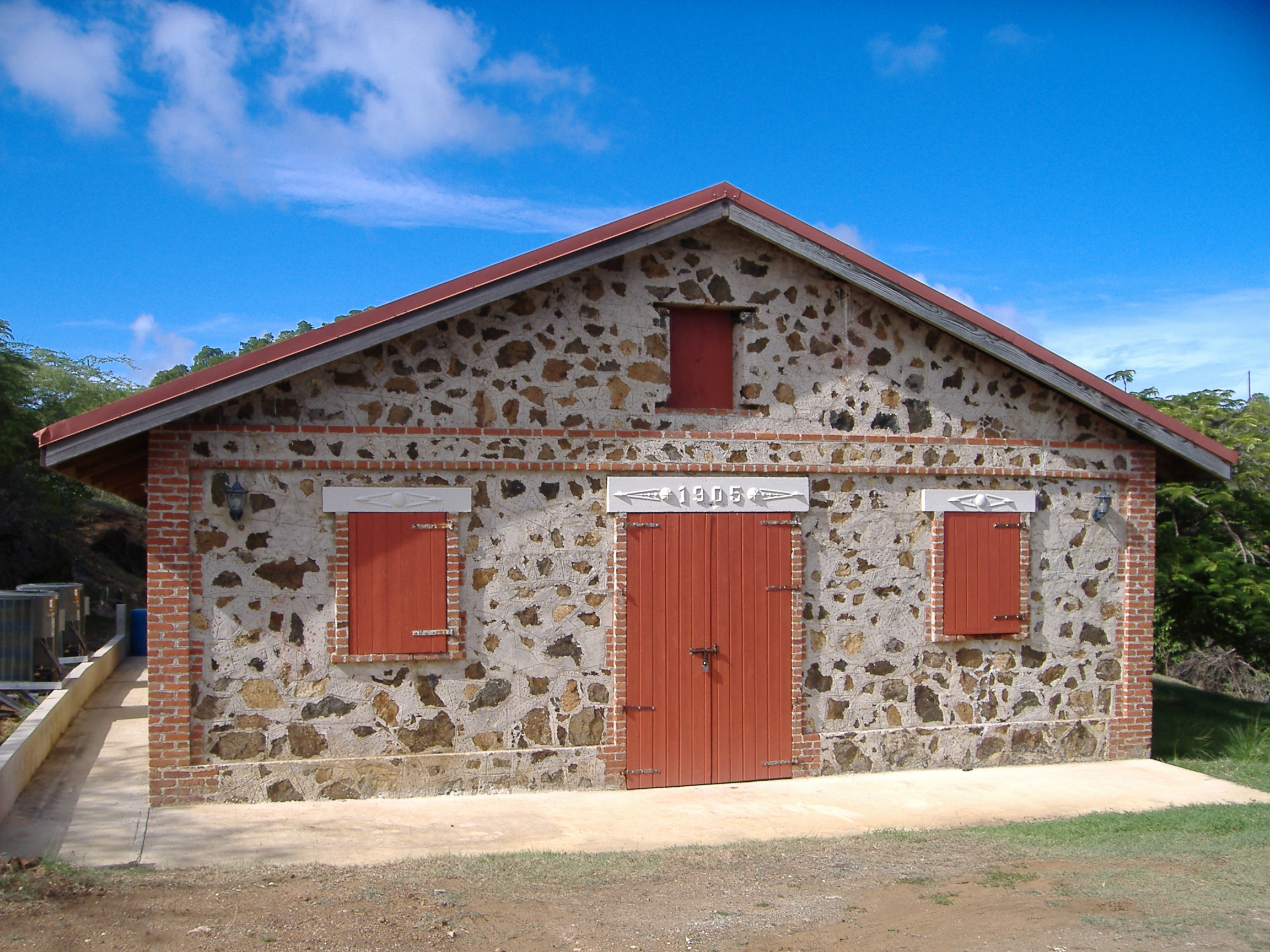
Museum in Culebra

== See also ==
- List of communities in Puerto Rico
- List of barrios and sectors of Culebra, Puerto Rico
